= 1886 Ossory by-election =

UK Parliamentary by-election

The 1886 Ossory by-election was held on 12 February 1886 for the United Kingdom House of Commons constituency of Queen's County Ossory. Arthur O'Connor of the Irish Parliamentary Party, member for the former Queen's County constituency, having been elected both in this seat and in East Donegal, chose to sit for the latter. The Queen's County Ossory seat thus became vacant, requiring a by-election. Only one candidate, Stephen O'Mara of the Irish Parliamentary Party, was nominated, and was elected unopposed. He held the seat until the general election later that year, which he did not contest.
