= Stephen O'Mara =

Stephen O'Mara may refer to:

- Stephen O'Mara (senator) (1844–1926), mayor of Limerick 1885–86, MP 1886, Senator 1925–26
- Stephen M. O'Mara (1884–1959), his son, mayor of Limerick 1921–23
