= John MacDonagh =

Irish film director

John MacDonagh (Irish: Seán Mac Donnchadha; 8 October 1879 – 1961) was an Irish film director, playwright, republican, and a participant in the 1916 Easter Rising.

MacDonagh was born 4 October 1879 in Cloughjordan, County Tipperary, where he grew up in a household filled with music, poetry and learning. Both his parents, Joseph McDonagh and Mary Parker, were teachers who strongly emphasized the value of education.

He toured with the Moody Manners Opera Company in England and the United States before writing the script for D.W. Griffith's The Fugitive (1910). He was appointed the first manager of the Irish Theatre Company when it formed in 1914.

During the 1916 Easter Rising, he was stationed alongside his brother Thomas MacDonagh (one of the seven leaders of the Rising) at the massive complex of Jacob's Biscuit Factory. Following the surrender, Thomas MacDonagh was court martialled, and executed by firing squad on 3 May 1916, aged thirty-eight.

MacDonagh last saw his brother in Richmond Barracks after the surrender. He was initially sentenced to life imprisonment and was sent to Knutsford Prison and thence to Frongoch internment camp, from which he was released in August 1916.

He became involved with the Film Company of Ireland. His first film as director was the comedy Paying the Rent (1917), starring Arthur Sinclair and photographed by Brian Magowan. This was followed by the feature Willy Reilly and His Colleen Bawn (1920, at the height of the Irish War of Independence), a historical drama based on a novel by William Carleton and produced by Jim Sullivan. It was shot in the grounds of St Enda's Rathfarnham, where his brother Thomas and Patrick Pearse had founded a school to promote Irish education. John MacDonagh played the part of Tom the Fool (under the alias of Richard Sheridan) in the film. Some of the actors, such as George Nesbit and Jim Plant, used false names in the credits to protect themselves during those politically troubled times. It was premiered at the Bohemian Cinema, Dublin, in April 1920. He also filmed the funeral of his brother Thomas MacDonagh's wife, Muriel, the largest ever seen in Dublin at the time. At the same time as filming Willy Reilly, he filmed the issuing of Republican Loan bonds by Michael Collins, signed on the block on which Robert Emmet had been beheaded. Buying the bonds were what the subtitle cards described as 'Republican notabilities' including Erskine Childers, Arthur Griffith, Grace Gifford (whose sister Muriel had married Thomas MacDonagh, and who married Joseph Plunkett an hour before his execution in 1916), and Joseph MacDonagh, his brother, Minister for Labour in the first Dáil, who would die on hunger strike on Christmas Day 1922.

After making other films in the United States he returned to theatre. From 1920 he managed the Irish Theatre Company's theatre in Hardwicke Street working with, among others, Jimmy O'Dea. In 1921 he wrote the theatrical hit The Irish Jew, about the election of a Jew as Lord Mayor of Dublin, for Broadway, in which O'Dea played a cameo part. This helped O'Dea on the way to become Ireland's most popular comedian. In 1922 he directed some light comedy films produced by Norman Whitten, including Casey's Millions, with Barrett MacDonnell, Chris Sylvester and Jimmy O'Dea, which was critically well received. In the same year he directed Wicklow Gold, from a libretto by himself, with Chris Sylvester, Jimmy O'Dea and Abbey actress Ria Mooney.

After working in plays by Shaw for a few years he and Jimmy O'Dea did revues, the first of which, Dublin To-Night, was produced at the Queen's Theatre in 1924. In 1928, this company's first production Here We Are won international acclaim, and in December of the same year it produced its first Christmas Pantomime, Sinbad the Sailor.

He subsequently returned to Ireland and joined Radio Éireann as productions director, a position he held until 1947.
