= Lawlor =

Lawlor is an Irish surname. Notable people with the surname include:

== Arts and entertainment ==
- Charlotte Lawlor (1878–1941), New Zealand poet, writer and advertising designer
- Gerri Lawlor, American actress
- John Lawlor (sculptor) (1820–1901), Irish sculptor
- John Lawlor (actor) (1941–2025), American actor
- Mary Lawlor (actress) (1907–1977), American stage and screen actress
- Sean Lawlor (1954–2009), Irish actor and playwright
- Stephen Lawlor, Irish artist
- Thomas Lawlor (opera singer), British opera singer

== Politics ==
- James Fintan Lalor (1807–1849), Irish revolutionary and writer
- Liam Lawlor (1945–2005), Irish politician
- Mike Lawlor, American politician and professor
- Patsy Lawlor (1933–1997), Irish politician
- Peter Lawlor (born 1948), Australian politician
- Thomas Lawlor (politician) (died 1945), Irish politician

== Sport ==
- Jim Lawlor (hurler) (1878–?), Irish hurler
- Jimmy Lawlor (1933–2012), Irish footballer
- Kit Lawlor (1922–2004), Irish footballer
- Liam Lawlor (hurler) (born 1985), Irish hurler
- Matt Lawlor (born 1988), English footballer and manager
- Mick Lawlor (Gaelic footballer), Irish Gaelic footballer
- Mick Lawlor (association footballer) (born 1949), Irish footballer
- Mike Lawlor (baseball) (1854–1918), American baseball player
- Pat Lawlor (hurler), Irish retired hurler
- Paul Lawlor, Irish Gaelic footballer
- Peter Lawlor (hurler), Irish hurler
- Raymond Lawlor (1888–1946), American soccer player
- Tom Lawlor (born 1983), American mixed martial artist
- Tyler Lawlor (born 1972), Canadian slalom canoeist

== Other ==
- Edward Lawlor (1907–1987), Church of the Nazarene minister
- James Fintan Lalor (1807–1849), Irish journalist and revolutionary
- Krista Lawlor, American philosopher
- Leonard Lawlor, American academic
- Mary Lawlor (human rights advocate) (born 1952), Irish activist
- Pat Lawlor, American pinball machine designer
- Robbie Lawlor (Irish criminal) (died 2020), Irish criminal
- Robert Lawlor, anthropologist

== See also ==
- Lawlor Island
- Lawlor Events Center
- Mount Lawlor
- Lalor
- O'Lawlor
- Lawler (disambiguation)
