= O'Lawlor =

O'Lawlor also known as Lawlor, Lawler, and Lalor is an Irish surname belonging to one of the Seven Septs of County Laois. According to historian C. Thomas Cairney, the O'Lawlors in Ireland were one of the chiefly families of the Loígis tribe who in turn came from the Cruthin tribe who were the first Celts to settle in Ireland from between 800 and 500 BC.

The Gaelic family name now most frequently found in English as Lawlor was Ó Leathlobhair. The earliest historical record now extant tells us that Lethlobar was a king of Ulaid who died in 871 AD. Ancient kings of Dál Riata and Ulaid and the Ulster family of Lawlors followed.

After the 10th century, the annals do not continue the story of this particular sept, but a family of the same name did rise to prominence in the Irish midlands. They were one of the "Seven Septs of Laois" and were kinsmen of the O'Mores. Their clan lands surrounded the famous Rock of Dunamase in County Laois (formerly spelled Laoighis or Leix) within the province of Leinster. Their family seat was Dysart Enos where they held sway until the time of Queen Elizabeth I and English colonization in the region.

As punishment for their courageous battles to protect their religious faith and national independence, the Lawlor chieftains who survived the infamous Massacre of Mullaghmast in 1577 were, with the O'More, dispossessed of their property and forced to settle in County Kerry where some descendants remain. County Laois was renamed Queen's County by the English during their occupation. Still, many Lawlor clansmen managed to remain in the homeland of their ancestors and survive the Elizabethan, Cromwellian and Williamite Wars. In 1922, the name County Laois was restored. Today, the greatest number of Lawlors appear in County Laois and lands eastward.

The Lawlor family motto "Strong and Faithful" to Ireland and the cause of liberty characterizes their story on the pages of Irish history as well as in the English-speaking world. James Fintan Lalor (1817–1849), son of patriot father Patrick "Patt" Lalor (1781–1856), was a noted revolutionary thinker and leader of his time. His brothers included Peter Lalor (1823–1889), leader of the insurgent miners at Eureka in 1854 in Australia and later Minister and Speaker in the Legislative Assembly of Victoria, and Richard Lalor (1821–1893) a nationalist member of the British House of Commons. Their cousins included Alice Lalor (1768–1846), founder of the Order of Visitation Sisters in the United States, Dr Joseph Lalor (1811–86) a reformist Irish mental health leader, and Don Joseph O'Lawlor, also known as Txemaria, (1768–1850), a Spanish general and governor of Granada. In the United States, Brigadier General Michael Kelly Lawler (1814–1882) was a noted officer under Grant in the Civil War. John Lalor (1820–1901) was a sculptor of international renown. More recently, Andrew John Lawler (b 1958) was appointed as Deputy Assistant Secretary of Commerce for NOAA International Fisheries and in 2020 was nominated to be Assistant Secretary of State. Additionally, Foster Mitchell Lalor, Jr. (1923-1991), rose to the rank of Rear Admiral in the United States Navy, with an illustrious career that began with his commission from Annapolis in 1944 and included his award of the Distinguished Service Medal for his contributions in the Vietnam conflict.

== See also ==
- Irish clans
