= Lalor =

Lalor is an Irish surname derived from the Irish Ó Leathlobhair, from leath- "leper; weak, ailing person". Notable people with the surname include:

- Denis Lalor, athlete
- Francis Ramsey Lalor (1856–1929), politician
- James Fintan Lalor, Irish rebel
- John Joseph Lalor (1840/1841–1899), political scientist
- John Lalor (1814–1856), journalist and author
- Kieran Lalor, politician
- Mike Lalor (born 1963), ice hockey player
- Patrick Lalor (1926–2016), Irish politician
- Patrick "Patt" Lalor (1781–1856), Irish national politician
- Peter Lalor, leader of the Eureka Stockade rebellion
- Richard Lalor (1823–1893), politician
- Richard Lalor Sheil (1791–1851), politician, writer and orator
- Teresa Lalor (died 1846), Irish nun
- Sam Lalor (born 2006) Australian Rules Footballer

== See also ==
- Lalor, Victoria, an outer suburb of Melbourne, Victoria, Australia
- Lalor railway station, a station on the South Morang railway line
- Lalor Park, New South Wales
- Division of Lalor, an electoral district in the Australian House of Representatives in Victoria, Australia
- ST Lalor, a tugboat
- Lawlor
