= Willy Reilly and His Colleen Bawn =

1920 Irish silent film directed by John MacDonagh

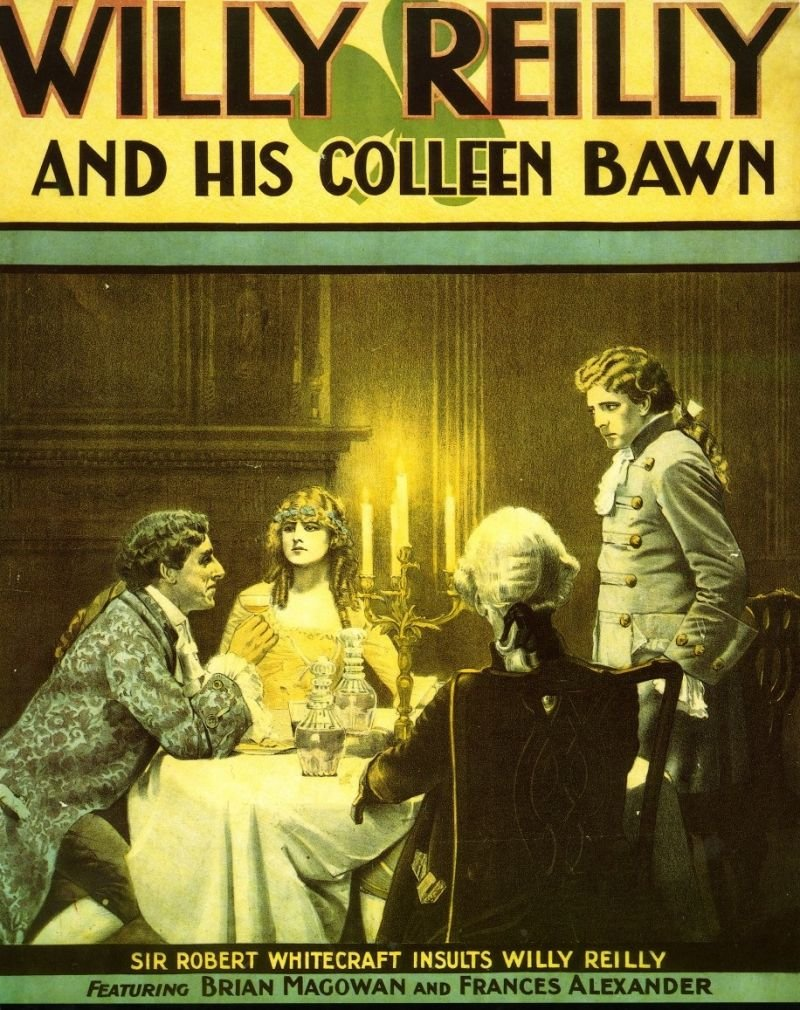
- Directed by: John MacDonagh
- Based on: Willy Reilly and His Dear Colleen Bawn by William Carleton
- Produced by: James Mark Sullivan; Ellen O'Mara Sullivan
- Starring: Brian Magowan; Frances Alexander
- Production company: Film Company of Ireland
- Distributed by: Film Company of Ireland
- Release dates: January 5, 1920 (Manchester); April 19, 1920 (Dublin)
- Running time: 106 minutes
- Language: Silent (English intertitles)

Willy Reilly and His Colleen Bawn is a 1920 Irish silent film adaptation of William Carleton's 1855 novel Willy Reilly and His Dear Colleen Bawn: A Tale Founded Upon Fact made by the Film Company of Ireland. Brian Magowan and Frances Alexander featured in the film. It is one of few films by the FCOI that remain in substantially complete form. John MacDonagh, the brother of Thomas MacDonagh, a signatory of the Proclamation of the Irish Republic in 1916, was the films director and played Tom the Fool under the pseudonym Richard Sheridan. The film concerns religious tolerance and the "triumph of love across the sectarian divide."

== Plot ==
The film is set in 18th-century County Cavan during the penal laws. A Catholic landowner, Willy Reilly, falls in love with Helen Folliard (the Colleen Bawn), the daughter of a Protestant Squire, after being invited to his home for saving him from Red Rapparee. Reilly is required to convert if he wishes to marry into the family, with her father favoring another suitor, Sir Robert Whitecraft, a persecutor of Catholics. Willy Reilly refuses to convert. Sir Robert soon enlists the help of Red Rapparee, telling him he wishes to see Reilly in Sligo Jail and conspires a plan with the goal of Reilly's imprisonment. Reilly soon becomes a fugitive of the law and is harbored by a Protestant clergyman, Rev. Brown, who offers because he "abhor[s] persecution" and for the "fact that" they "are fellow-Irishmen". Rev. Brown and Mr. Hastings report the actions of Sir Robert, who burned down Reilly's manor that had the ownership transferred to Mr. Hastings, to the Lord-lieutenant. The Lord-lieutenant issues a warrant for Sir Roberts arrest. Reilly eventually returns disguised as a peasant and becomes a gardener for Squire Folliard. Reilly and the Colleen Bawn elope soon after Reilly's true identity is discovered. Reilly and the Colleen Bawn are caught. Helen is returned to her father, who promises her to Sir Robert, with the wedding abandoned the day of when Sir Robert is found to be an arsonist and murderer. Reilly is charged with theft and abduction, but eventually found guilty only of abduction. He is exiled for seven years. Afterwards, Helen remains wistful until she is reunited with Reilly and her father accepts their relationship despite their different religions.

== Cast ==
- Brian Magowan (born James Joseph Smyth) as Willy Reilly
- Frances Alexander as Helen Folliard/The Colleen Bawn
- John MacDonagh (credited as Richard Sheridan) as Tom the Fool
- Jim Plant (credited as Seamus MacBlante) as Sir Robert Whitecraft
- Dermot O'Dowd as Squire Folliard
- James Barrett McDonnell as Red Rapparee
- Frank Walsh as Mr. Hastings
- [data missing] as Rev. Brown

== Production ==
Willy Reilly and his Colleen Bawn was filmed on 35 mm, and it was produced by James Mark Sullivan and Ellen O'Mara Sullivan. It was directed by John MacDonagh, the brother of Thomas MacDonagh. Filming took place in 1919. John MacDonagh left for Scotland immediately following the end of production in order to evade arrest after directing the Dáil Bonds film, also known as the Republican Loan film, which featured prominent republicans including Michael Collins and families of executed 1916 leaders. He filmed the propaganda film during a break in directing Willy Reilly and his Colleen Bawn. Some portions were filmed at the St. Enda's School in Rathfarnham, which is now the site of the Pearse Museum. The film has seven reels.

== Release ==
The film premiered at Manchester's Free Trade Hall on 5 January 1920. It was first shown in Ireland in Dublin on 19 April 1920. The film was released during the Irish War of Independence.
