= Laois (disambiguation) =

Laois may refer to:

- County Laois, Ireland; formerly called Queen's County, Leix, Laoighis
  - Laois (Dáil constituency)
  - Queen's County (Parliament of Ireland constituency)
  - Queen's County (UK Parliament constituency)
  - Queen's County Ossory, UK Parliament constituency
  - Queen's County Leix, UK Parliament constituency
  - Laois GAA, governs Gaelic games in the county
- Loígis, medieval Irish kingdom

== See also ==
- Laos, country in Southeast Asia
