= Patrick Meehan (disambiguation) =

Patrick Meehan (1927–1994) was the victim of a controversial miscarriage of justice in Scotland.

Patrick Meehan may also refer to:

- Patrick Meehan (Irish politician, born 1852) (1852–1913), Irish Nationalist MP
- Patrick Meehan (Irish politician, born 1877) (1877–1929), his son, also an Irish Nationalist MP
- Patrick Meehan (producer), record producer
- Pat Meehan (born 1955), US attorney and member of the House of Representatives
- Paddy Meehan (footballer), Republic of Ireland international footballer
- Paddy Meehan, a fictional reporter created by Denise Mina
- Charles Patrick Meehan (1812–1890), Catholic priest and historian
