= Arthur O'Connor =

Arthur O'Connor may refer to:

- Arthur O'Connor (United Irishman) (1763–1852), United Irishman and later a general in Napoleon's army
- Arthur O'Connor (politician, born 1844) (1844–1923), member of parliament for Queen's County
- Art O'Connor (1888–1950), Irish politician, lawyer and judge
