= Stephen O'Mara (senator) =

Irish politician (1844–1926)

Senator
- In office 17 September 1925 – 26 July 1926

Member of Parliament
- In office February 1886 – July 1886
- Constituency: Queen's County Ossory

Personal details
- Born: 26 December 1844 Limerick, Ireland
- Died: 26 July 1926 (aged 81) Limerick, Ireland
- Party: Irish Parliamentary Party; Cumann na nGaedheal
- Spouse: Ellen Pigott (m. 1867)
- Children: 12, including James, Stephen, Jnr, Phons and Ellen
- Relatives: Joseph O'Mara (brother)

Stephen O'Mara (26 December 1844 – 26 July 1926) was an Irish nationalist politician and businessman from Limerick.

== Personal life ==
O'Mara's father James O'Mara was an early supporter of Isaac Butt, and owned a bacon factory in Limerick. Stephen entered the family business. His brother Joseph O'Mara became an opera singer. Stephen married Ellen Pigott in 1867. They had 12 children, of whom the first three died of diphtheria in 1872. Sons James, Stephen, Jnr and Phons became prominent Irish republicans and radicalised their father's later political views. A daughter Ellen, was also a nationalist, and she and her husband started the most prolific Irish Silent film company, Film Company of Ireland.

== Political career ==
O'Mara joined Limerick Corporation in 1881, becoming the first Nationalist Mayor of Limerick in 1885. He served again the following year, and headed a campaign to raise funds for an organ for the Limerick Athenaeum. In a by-election in February 1886, he was returned unopposed as Irish Parliamentary Party MP for Queen's County Ossory. He did not stand in the July 1886 general election. He was High Sheriff of Limerick city in 1888, 1913, and 1914.

O'Mara took the Parnellite side when the Irish National League split in the 1890s. In 1908, he resigned as trustee of the Party's funds. In the 1918 general election, O'Mara supported Sinn Féin as it eclipsed the less radical Irish Parliamentary Party. His sons were active in the Irish War of Independence; in the Irish Civil War, Stephen Snr was pro-Treaty, as was his MP son James O'Mara; Stephen Jnr was anti-Treaty, though relatively conciliatory. In the 1925 election to the Free State Seanad, O'Mara was elected on the 65th and final count. He died the following year.

Parliament of the United Kingdom
Preceded by Arthur O'Connor	Member of Parliament for Queen's County Ossory; 1886–1886	Succeeded by William Archibald Macdonald
