= Kenelm Thomas Digby =

Irish MP for Queen's County

Kenelm Thomas Digby MP

Member of Parliament for Queen's County
- In office 23 November 1868 – 8 April 1880 Serving with Edmund Dease (1870 – 1880); John FitzPatrick (1868 – 1870)
- Preceded by: John FitzPatrick; Francis Plunkett Dunne
- Succeeded by: Richard Lalor; Arthur O'Connor

Personal details
- Born: Kenelm Thomas Joseph Digby; 1840 Bath, Somerset, England
- Died: 20 November 1893 (aged 52–53) Oxford, Oxfordshire, England
- Party: Home Rule
- Other political affiliations: Liberal (until 1874)
- Parent(s): Kenelm Henry Digby; Jane Mary Dillon

Kenelm Thomas Digby (1840 – 20 November 1893) was an Irish Home Rule League and Liberal politician.

He was elected as a Member of Parliament (MP) for Queen's County as a Liberal candidate in 1868, and then again as a Home Rule candidate in 1874, but did not stand at the next election in 1880.

Parliament of the United Kingdom
Preceded by John FitzPatrick; Francis Plunkett Dunne	Member of Parliament for Queen's County; 1868 – 1880; With: Edmund Dease (1870 – 1880); John FitzPatrick (1868 – 1870)	Succeeded by Richard Lalor; Arthur O'Connor
