= Joseph O'Mara =

Irish singer (1864–1927)

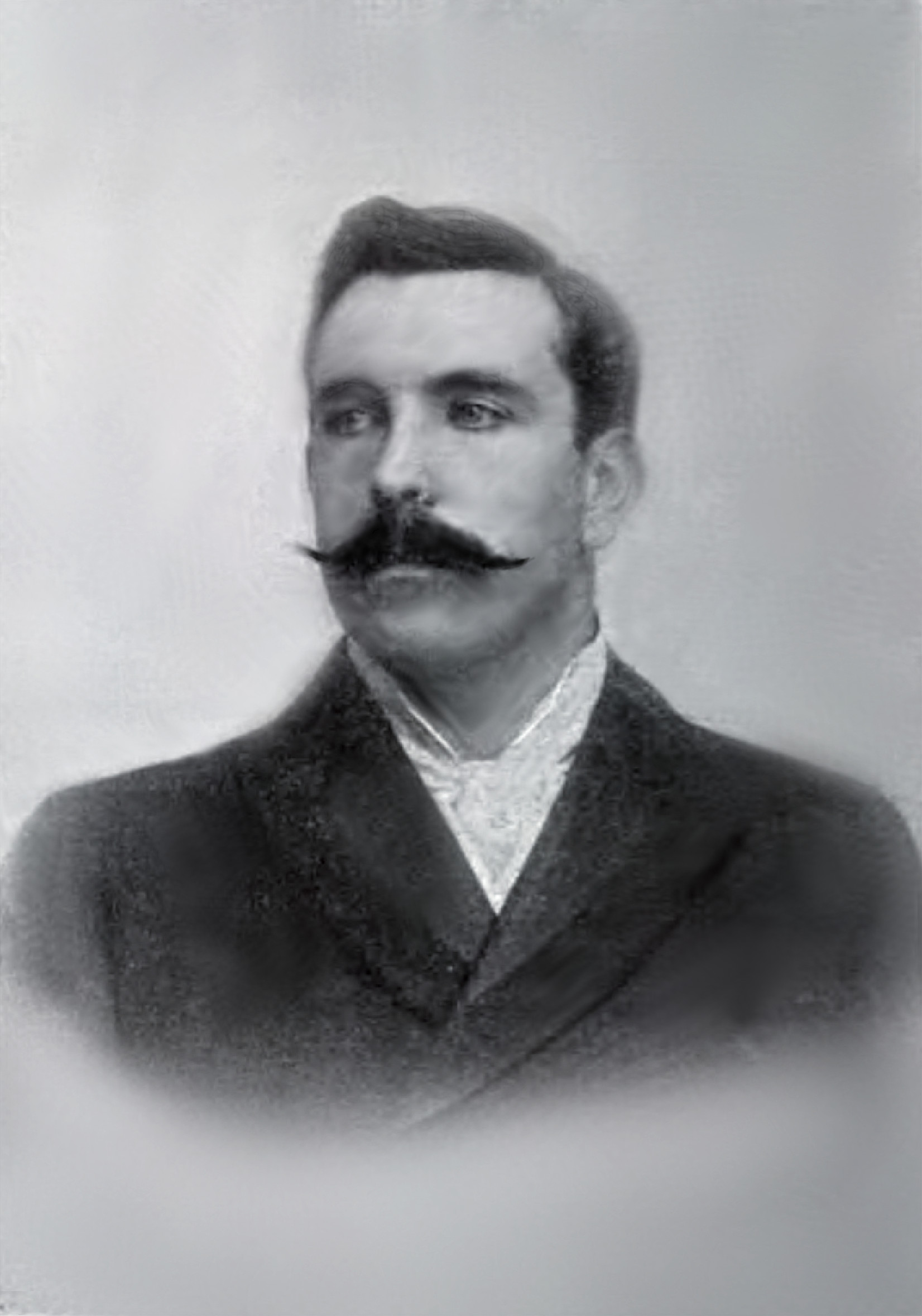
Joseph O'Mara c. 1893

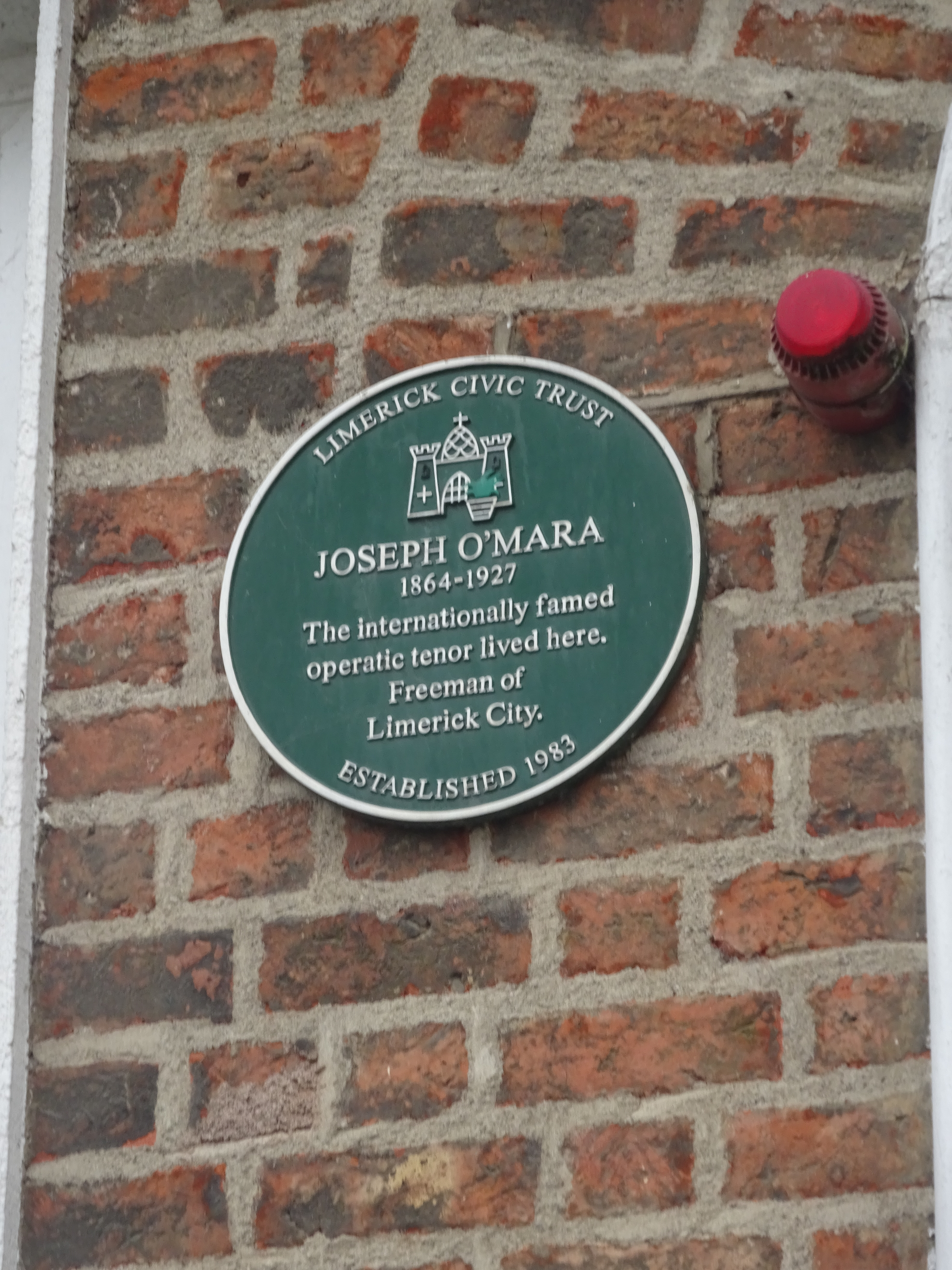
Plaque at O'Mara's Limerick home

Joseph O'Mara (16 July 1864 – 5 August 1927) was an Irish opera singer of the Victorian and Edwardian eras. After studying opera in Milan, Italy, he made his London stage debut in 1891 in the tenor title role of the opera Ivanhoe by Arthur Sullivan and soon appeared in other operas. In 1894 he first appeared at Covent Garden Theatre. For three years, he was the principal tenor at Theatre Royal, Drury Lane, also appearing in the pantomime there and elsewhere. In 1896, he created the tenor lead, Mike Murphy, in Charles Villiers Stanford's opera Shamus O'Brien, also playing the role on tour and in America.

After a series of concert engagements in London, O'Mara travelled again to America to create the tenor lead in Reginald De Koven's The Highwayman. He was a leading tenor with the Moody-Manners Opera Company in London from 1902 to 1908, also performing extensively in Ireland with the company. O'Mara was granted the Freedom of the City of Limerick in 1908, the only time that a singer achieved this honour. In 1908, in Patrick Bidwell's musical Peggy Machree on Broadway in New York City. In 1909, O'Mara returned to Britain and joined the Thomas Beecham Company, singing tenor leads over the next few years, while also continuing to perform in concerts. In 1912, he founded O'Mara's Travelling Opera Company, in which he was the principal tenor until his farewell performance as Lohengrin in 1926. In all, O'Mara sang 67 tenor roles. In 1926, he was the first tenor to broadcast in Ireland.

== Biography ==
Born at Limerick, Ireland, O'Mara was the second youngest of thirteen children of James O'Mara, a politician and owner of a bacon factory, and Hanora nee Foley, who died when O'Mara was a teenager. He was educated at a Jesuit school, the Crescent College. As a boy, he sang as a chorister in St John's Cathedral, Limerick. At eighteen he sailed for a year aboard an ocean liner travelling between Dundee and Calcutta before returning to his father's business, "totally cured" of the desire to live a life at sea. He also sang in the choir of St. Michael's Church in Limerick. O'Mara's family was prominent in Limerick, producing a number of mayors of the city, including his nephew Stephen O'Mara (1886–1959), who was mayor from 1921–1923.

=== Early career ===
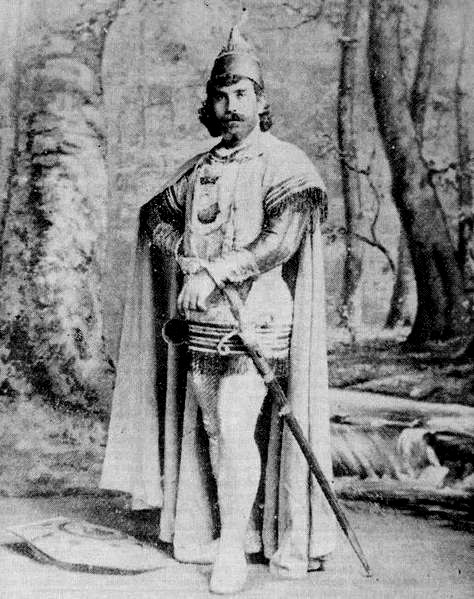
O'Mara as the title character in Wagner's Lohengrin, 1894-5

Encouraged by his friend J. F. Murray, O'Mara studied opera in Milan under Signor Moretti for two years, and in 1891 he made his London stage debut when he landed the title role in the original production of the opera Ivanhoe by Arthur Sullivan (of Gilbert and Sullivan) at the newly built Royal English Opera House in London. This was followed by La Basoche at the same opera house, after which he returned to Milan for further study.

From 1893 to 1894 he toured Britain and Ireland with Sir Augustus Harris's Italian Opera Company to sing the principal tenor roles in Cavalleria rusticana, Faust, Pagliacci, Carmen, Lohengrin and Die Meistersinger, among others, his strong Heldentenor voice being particularly appropriate for the latter two roles. In 1894 he first appeared at Covent Garden Theatre. For three years, O'Mara was the principal tenor at Theatre Royal, Drury Lane, also appearing in the pantomime of Jack and the Beanstalk there. He then played in the pantomime Aladdin at the Prince of Wales Theatre, Liverpool. In 1896, he created the tenor lead, Mike Murphy, in Charles Villiers Stanford's opera Shamus O'Brien, with Henry Wood conducting. After a tour of Britain and Ireland in Shamus O'Brien, the Harris company brought the opera to America in 1897, where, with his new wife, the former Miss Power, O'Mara enjoyed great personal success. Throughout the rest of his career, Mike Murphy would remain one of O'Mara's signature roles.

O'Mara and his wife returned to London for a series of concert engagements, but in the Autumn of 1897, they travelled again to America where O'Mara created the tenor lead in Reginald De Koven's The Highwayman. O'Mara gave many private concerts at the beginning of the new century, but happily returned to opera as leading tenor with the Moody-Manners Opera Company in London from 1902 to 1908, performing in Maritana, Cavalleria, Faust, Lohengrin, Pagliacci, Il trovatore, Carmen, Charles Gounod's Roméo et Juliette, and the first English-language production of Puccini's Madame Butterfly (1907), also performing extensively in Ireland with the company. O'Mara was granted the Freedom of the City of Limerick in 1908, the only time that a singer achieved this honour.

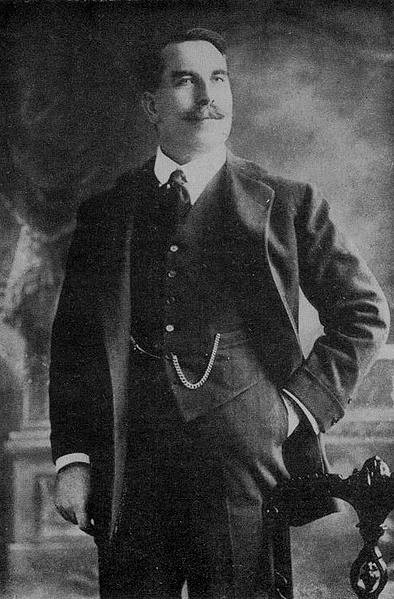
Joseph O'Mara

O'Mara achieved a number of "firsts" for Ireland and Irish tenors: He was the first tenor in Ireland to sing Enzo in La Gloconda and in 1908 the first such Rodolfo in La bohème. Later he was the first to sing Cavaradossi in Ireland and in the same season was in the Irish premiere of Samson et Dalila. O'Mara's fame spread even further when he starred, in 1908, in Patrick Bidwell's musical Peggy Machree at The Broadway Theatre in New York City, earning uniformly enthusiastic reviews for his acting as well as his singing. In 1909, O'Mara returned to Britain and joined the Thomas Beecham Company, singing in Carmen, Faust and Tales of Hoffmann, among others over the next few years, while also continuing to perform in concerts.

A recording of O'Mara survives from 1901, which was featured on Mo Cheol Thu, RTÉ Radio 1, on 25 October 1992. His recordings included "An April Birthday" and "Friend and Lover", by Landon Ronald, in 1902, and "Ochone! When I used to be young" from Seamus O'Brien, 1911.

=== O'Mara's Travelling Opera Company and last years ===
In 1912, he founded O'Mara's Travelling Opera Company, in which he was the principal tenor until 1926. In 1913 he opened their Dublin season singing Raoul in The Huguenots. At the Theatre Royal, Leeds, his company performed Puccini's La bohème and Madame Butterfly in 1918 and Verdi's Rigoletto in 1921. The company also revived many Michael Balfe works. In all, O'Mara sang 67 tenor roles. The Irish Times of Dublin wrote in February 1918: "Mr. O'Mara's Lohengrin is to my mind one of his best parts, it is not a hurricane of passion like 'Tannhäuser', it demands a purer vocalism, a quiet dignity, a calm and spiritual character, and yet, at the back of it all, an abundance of reserve power. This is what we get from Mr. O'Mara, we never lose sight of the fact that his Lohengrin has come from another sphere and that no earthly Prince has power to restrain him, O'Mara sang his music with such fervour." His farewell performance was as Lohengrin in 1926.

In 1926, O'Mara was the first tenor to broadcast in Ireland at the opening of the new Irish radio station (Raidio 2RN – now R.T.É.). He and his wife had five children, Eileen, Nora, Power, Moya and Joey.

O'Mara died in Dublin at the age of 63.
