= Watsonia Football Club =

Watsonia Sporting Club

Names

Club details
- Founded: 1966
- Competition: NFNL
- President: Warren Harris
- Coach: Anthony McGregor
- Ground: Binnak Park

Other information
- Official website: watsoniasc.com.au

The Watsonia Sporting Club is an Australian rules football club located in Watsonia, Victoria that currently competes in Division 3 in the Northern Football Netball League.

== History of the Watsonia Football Club ==
The club was established in 1966 when a group of local parents, motivated by a desire to support youth sport in the district, held a meeting at the Watsonia RSL Hall. The formation of the club was guided by former Footscray and Collingwood player Harvey Stevens. In its inaugural year, Watsonia fielded two teams: an Under-13 team that won the Greensborough Midget League premiership, and an Under-15 team that claimed the Preston and Reservoir League flag.

In 1967, Watsonia began playing its home games at A.K. Lines Reserve, fielding four teams in the Panton Hill League. That year, the Senior and Reserve sides finished sixth, the Under-15s were runners-up, and the Under-13s secured another premiership. Initially, players used a small tin shed purchased from Watsonia Motors as changerooms, but it was soon replaced due to complaints from neighbours regarding players changing outdoors.

Significant progress came in 1968 when committee member and builder Gerald Browne constructed the club's first dedicated clubrooms. On the field, the Under-13 team continued the club's early success by winning another premiership.

In 1969, Watsonia joined the Diamond Valley Football League (DVFL) under coach Barry Smart, formerly of Sandringham. The senior team struggled, failing to record a win that season, while the junior sides continued to perform strongly, with the Watsonia South Under-13s winning the premiership.

The club recorded its first senior DVFL victory on 30 May 1970, defeating Lalor 16.16 (112) to 9.12 (66), one of six wins achieved by the senior team that season. The Reserves also finished with six wins.

The club's foundation was guided by its first committee: Neil McGovern (President), Harvey Stevens (Secretary), Michael Walsh (Treasurer), with members Jack Bowman, Willy Flores, Gerald Browne, and Bill Cope.

The club fields teams in Senior football and Netball, as well as Under-19's as has a junior affiliate agreement with Mill Park Football Club.

== Premierships ==
=== Seniors (2) ===
Year	League	Division	Result	Best on Ground	Captain	Coach
2016	NFNL	3	Watsonia 14.11.95 def Epping 6.12.48	Levi Moss	Matthew Crompton	Corey McCall
1987	DVFL	2	Watsonia 13.13.91 def Reservoir-Lakeside 8.11.59		Adrian Sanderson	Barry Rist

=== Reserves (1) ===
Year	League	Division	Result	Best on Ground	Captain	Coach
2013	NFNL	3	Watsonia 8.8.56 defeated Panton Hill 7.6.48	Jamie Harris	Simon Joules	Steven Leeman

=== Under 19 (2) ===
Year	League	Division	Result	Best on Ground	Captain	Coach
2022	NFNL	3	Watsonia (7.13.55) def. Mernda (5.4.34)	Patrick Dooley	Nick Lawson & Toby Berardi	Silvio Iocannis
1977	DVFL	1	Watsonia def. Reservoir-Lakeside			Willy Flores

== Senior League Best & Fairests ==
Year	League	Division	Player
2016	NFNL	3	Matthew Crompton
2013	NFNL	3	Lochie Dornauf
2000	DVFL	2	Paul Eccles
1990	DVFL	2	Malcolm Griffiths
1979	DVFL	1	John Ellis

== Reserves League Best & Fairests ==
Year	League	Division	Player
2023	NFNL	2	Jack Larkin
2014	NFNL	3	Simon Joules
2013	NFNL	3	Simon Joules
1990	DVFL	2	R.Blinman
1987	DVFL	2	A.Lampton
1981	DVFL	1	K.Carey

== Under 19's League Best & Fairests ==
Year	League	Division	Player
2011	NFL	3	Nick Gaylor
1983	DVFL	2	Joe Viglione
1979	DVFL	1	Mick Lamb
1977	DVFL	1	Malcolm Griffiths
1975	DVFL	1	Graeme L .Anderson

== Senior League Leading Goalkicker Award ==
Year	League	Division	Player	Goals
2024	NFNL	2	Ethan Lowe	57
2023	NFNL	2	James Lucente	59
2000	DVFL	2	Gavin Tapner	90
1979	DVFL	1	Robert Downie	64

== Reserves League Leading Goalkicker Award ==
Year	League	Division	Player	Goals
2022	NFNL	2	James Latross	68

== Under 19 League Leading Goalkicker Award ==
Year	League	Division	Player	Goals
2019	NFNL	2	Kyle Wheatley	47
2013	NFNL	2	Jack Larkin	61
2012	NFNL	2	Josh Clancy	80
1995	DVFL	2	M. La Franci	41
1977	DVFL	1	Andrew Smith	50
1973	DVFL	1	Gary Livermore	55

== Watsonia Team Of The Decade (2010-19) ==
Watsonia: Team of the Decade (2010-19)
B:	Corey Bennett	Graeme Hines	Xavier Kelly
HB:	Jarryd Allan	Ben Sutherland	Daniel Watson
C:	Andrew Kidd	Matt Crompton (C)	Kyle Kemp
HF:	Hayden Mitchell	Adrian Alfonsi	Allan Young
F:	Andy Bennett	Jeremy Bennett (VC)	Jack Larkin
Foll:	Matt Crawford	Ben Weissenfeld	Jordan Brown
Int:	Jamie Haber	John Perichon	
Int:	Daniel Norden	Daniel Gervasoni	
Coach:	Corey McCall		

== Club Best & Fairest Awards ==
=== Seniors ===
Year	1st	2nd	3rd
2025	Josh Boulton (3)	Ben Callaghan	Harry Sinclair
2024	Daniel Annetta	Harry Sinclair	Josh Boulton
2023	Josh Boulton (2)	Kobe Van Zwienen	Harry Sinclair
2022	Josh Boulton	Corey Potter	Kobe Van Zwienen
2021	Teague Van Zwienen	Lachlan Potter	Riley Taylor
2019	Daniel Watson	Hayden Mitchell	Xavier Kelly
2018	Matthew Crompton (3)	Matt Gibbs	Allan Young
2017	Matthew Crompton (2)	Ben Anderson	Ben Sutherland
2016	Matthew Buzinskas	Hayden Mitchell	Matthew Crompton
2015	Jarryd Allan	Jordan Brown	Andrew Kidd
2014	Hayden Mitchell	Jarryd Allan	John Perichon
2013	Tom Wallis	Tony Hogg	Matt Crompton
2012	Matthew Crompton	Joel Buckley	Paul McConnell
2011	Paul McConnell	Eldon Abbott	Allan Young
2010	Michael Ryan	Gary Ring	Matthew Calcutt
2009	Dean Richardson (2)	Patrick Tarrant	Tony Hogg
2008	Sabastian Ciavola	Tony Hogg	Adam Curran
2007	Dean Richardson	Danny O’Sullivan	Marc Ventura
2006	Shane Hodgson		
2005	Corey Bennett		
2004	Paul Eccles (4)		
2003	Paul Eccles (3)		
2002	Paul Eccles (2)		
2001	Adrian Talarico		
2000	Paul Eccles		
1999	M.Grech		
1998	Warren Harris		
1997	A.Parke		

=== Reserves ===
Year	1st	2nd	3rd
2025	Jack Larkin (4)	Nick Stone	Mason Grech
2024	Jack Larkin (3)	Liam Doherty	Owen Gao
2023	Jack Larkin (2)	Spencer Briggs	Cooper Burns & Fraser Kubeil
2022	Jack Larkin	James Latross	Luke Whyte
2021	Charlie Khoury	Ryan Eley	Gary Ring
2019	Ryan Eley (2)	Sean Smith	Austin Creak
2018	Gary Barton	Ben McKenzie	Michael Paske
2017	Ryan Eley	Sam Miles	Luke Hazelager
2016	Sam Leishman	James Latross	Brayden Mann
2015	Andrew Reid (2)	Simon Joules	Ryan Eley & Jake Osbourne
2014	Andrew Reid	Simon Joules	Steve Rickard
2013	Simon Joules (2)	Nathan Groves	Jon Bunn & Ryan Joules
2012	Simon Joules	Matt Buckley	Gary Ring
2011	Christian Daly-Thomson	Daniel Camilleri	Dylan Saw & Gary Ring
2010	Chris McGregor	Christian Daly-Thomson	Luke Gaylor
2009	Eldon Abbott	Nathan Groves & Steve Rickard	Clint Dunell
2008	Nathan Groves	Hayden Byrne	Cameron Webb

=== Under 19s ===
Year	1st	2nd	3rd
2025	Kobi Maynard	Matthew Sommerville	Dean Talarico & Jasper Tucker
2023	James Charbel	David Gill	Ben Park
2022	Nick Lawson & Toby Berardi	Liam Doherty	Jack Tatter
2019	Jordan Kubeil	Frasier Kubeil	Noah Bazzano
2018	Adrian Saccuzzo (2)	Christopher Bogoefski	Connor Fitzgerald
2017	Adrian Saccuzzo	Dhiraj Shivakumar	Vincent Nativo
2015	Luke Turco	Kane Richardson	Austin Creak
2013	Rodney Box	Jamie Haber	Ben Sutherland & Jack Larkin
2012	Jamie Haber	Nathan Alty	Liam McInereny & Josh Clancy
2011	Tyson Veenman	Beau Rankin	Liam McInerney & Timothy Edgell
2010	Luke Money	David Bilusic	Tyson Veenman
2009	Gary Ring	Jess Barnett	Brett George
2008	Liam Symons	Matthew Crawford	Gary Ring
2007	Jamie Harris	Steve Rickard	Glenn Wilkins & Jarrod Magann

=== Under 17s ===
Year	1st	2nd	3rd
2011	Nick Gaylor	Matthew Rutter	Jake Plunkett

Honour Board
