= Joseph Lalor =

Irish physician

Joseph Lalor (1811 – 18 August 1886) was a pioneering Irish mental health administrator and a reforming superintendent of the Richmond District Asylum for 29 years (1857–1886).

== Early life ==
Lalor was born in 1811 at Cascade House, Freshford, County Kilkenny, the fourth and youngest son of Richard Lalor (c. 1760 – 1823), a prominent local landholder, and Mary Carroll. Joseph's older brother Richard Lalor (c. 1790 – 1846) of Cascade, a local magistrate and landholder, was involved in the meetings associated with the Tithe War of the 1830s alongside his first cousin Patrick "Patt" Lalor (1781–1856) of Tenakill later a nationalist MP for Queen's County. Joseph Lalor was reported as attending a meeting in favour of the Repeal Movement in 1830 at Freshford with his brothers William and Florence in 1830 and as contributing to 'Repeal Rent' to support the campaign in the 1840s. Other cousins were Alice Lalor (1768–1846) of Ballyragget, founder of the Order of Visitation Sisters in the United States. and Peter Lalor, the revolutionary Australian political leader. Joseph's brother, Richard J Lalor, served a term in the New York State Assembly (1860–62) and was editor of the Irish American newspaper.

== Medical career ==
Joseph Lalor graduated from Trinity College Dublin in 1830 and with an MD from the University of Glasgow in 1839. He practised as a physician in Kilkenny, and held appointments in the City of Kilkenny Dispensary and Cholera Hospital and Workhouse, before he was appointed as the first resident physician of the Kilkenny District Asylum (1852–57). As McKeogh (p. 11) reports: "By any standards, he was a remarkably humane and enlightened man who can be justly hailed as one of the great pioneers of Irish psychiatry". A strong supporter of 'active employment or energetic muscular motion ... combined with amusements which have a soothing or cheering influence over the mind, with very good effect.' Lalor also avoided mechanical restraints or seclusion as 'treatments' arguing: "Mild, moral treatment and not coercion has been found most conducive to the easy and successful management of the insane; and it is at the same time that which is dictated by those feelings of humanity which should direct our conduct towards our fellow beings, being so afflicted as the insane".

In 1857, Lalor was appointed the Resident Medical Superintendent of the Richmond District Lunatic Asylum in Dublin, Ireland's largest with over 600 inmates (rising to over 1100 by 1885). He held this position for the next 29 years and came to be regarded as one of the most enlightened asylum superintendents in Europe, and Richmond became widely known for its enlightened methods of treatment. Early reforms included measures to arouse, animate and educate the inmates, although Lalor is best known for his strong belief in education and training, including the employment school teachers within the Asylum. Lalor described his approach in an 1878 article follows: "I consider that education and training are most valuable agents in the treatment of the insane of all classes, whether simply lunatics, or idiots and imbeciles, or criminal lunatics, and that it expresses in name and substance what has long been known in reference to lunatics in general as to their moral treatment ... .starting with the proposition that education and training form the basis of the moral treatment of all classes of the insane." Reading, singing and therapy were much cultivated, while object and picture lessons were given. Along with the schools, converts were given every fortnight, furnishings improved, and inmates encouraged to eat together. The leading British psychiatrist Dr Daniel Hack Tuke, in a review of the asylum services in Britain and Ireland, described Lalor as a "credit to Ireland" and wrote that his system of employment and training patients was more efficient than anything he had seen elsewhere.

On his retirement from Richmond in 1886, an article in the Irish Times (5/8/1886) paid the following tribute: "The retirement of Joseph Lalor Esq MD from the position of Resident Medical Superintendent of the Richmond Lunatic Asylum is an event of considerable importance ... In Richmond, he has full scope for his undoubted genius and for the human projects which he both conceived and put into execution with a decision of character and a perseverance absolutely necessary in one holding his position ... The fame of Dr Lalor’s mode of treatment spread to all Irish asylums, to England, to the United States and even to Germany; superintendents of asylums came to the Richmond Asylum to see for themselves, and the records of their visits go to prove that Dr Lalor was universally regarded as a humane and courageous administrator, and a benefactor of his kind".

The 1886 death of the "excellent and kind hearted Dr Lalor" was noted in the British Journal of Psychiatry: "It may in short be said that Dr Lalors administration was a great success and no one could visit the institution without being struck with the general comfort of the patients ... while the man himself could not fail to impress with his wonderful good nature, found of spirits and good humour, and the complete devotion of his mind to the interests of his patients".

== Later life ==
Joseph Lalor inherited a 439-acre property at Clintstown, 6 km east of Freshford co Kilkenny, which he held throughout his life. He was a foundation member of the Kilkenny Archaeological Society and the Statistical and Social Inquiry Society of Ireland. In 1861, he became the 7th president (and first Irish president) of the British Association of Medical Officers of Asylums and Hospitals for the Insane. He died 18 August 1886 at his son Richard's residence in Sligo aged 75.

Lalor married (1) Mary MacEnery (died c. 1838), (2) Mary Redmond (died before 1860), and (3) (c. 1862) Ann Bridget Duckett (born c, 1837), and had at least seven children.
