= Phons O'Mara =

Irish politician (1887–1958)

Alphonsus O'Mara

Mayor of Limerick
- In office 1918–1920

Personal details
- Born: 13 October 1887 Limerick, Ireland
- Died: 16 February 1958 (aged 70) Limerick, Ireland
- Party: Irish Parliamentary Party; Sinn Féin
- Spouse: Monica Delany (m. 1915)
- Parent: Stephen O'Mara (father)
- Relatives: James O'Mara (brother); Stephen M. O'Mara (brother); Ellen Sullivan (sister)
- Education: Albert Agricultural College
- Occupation: Businessman

Alphonsus M. O'Mara (13 October 1887 – 16 February 1958) was a businessman and Irish republican Mayor of Limerick from 1918 to 1920.

O'Mara was a son of Stephen O'Mara, Snr, himself a former Mayor of Limerick and briefly an Irish Parliamentary Party MP. Phons O'Mara was the brother of another mayor of Limerick, Stephen M. O'Mara.

In 1918 he stripped Windham Wyndham-Quin, 4th Earl of Dunraven and Mount-Earl of the freedom of the City because of Dunraven's support for conscription. In 1919 he helped negotiate the end of the Limerick Soviet. His business activity related to the family bacon business, and he became owner of Donnolly's bacon factory.

Civic offices
Preceded by Stephen Quin	Mayor of Limerick; 1918–1920	Succeeded by Michael O'Callaghan
