= Joseph O'Lawlor =

Joseph O’Lawlor (sometimes O’Lalor; 11 July 1768 – 19 October 1850) was an Irish-born Spanish general who fought under the Duke of Wellington during the Napoleonic Wars and later served as Governor of Granada.

== Early life ==
He was born on 11 July 1768 at Clonaheen in the parish of Rosenallis, County Laois, Ireland, to Peter Lalor and Elizabeth Brenan. Because Rosenallis is part of the Catholic diocese of Kildare and Leighlin, O’Lawlor's birthplace is sometimes incorrectly given as Kildare. A member of the O'Lawlor clan, he was a cousin of Patrick "Patt" Lalor (1781–1856), one time nationalist MP for Queen's County and father of Peter Lalor, the Australian revolutionary and politician, and also of Alice Lalor (1769–1846), founder of the Order of Visitation Nuns in the United States. According to his entry in the Spanish Enciclopedia Universal Ilustrada, O’Lawlor was "first born of one of the most noble families of Ireland, he was obligated to leave his homeland due to the persecution suffered, his goods having been confiscated and the members of his family dispersed to the continent [Europe] or America." Orphaned at an early age, he and his younger brother James (1770–1808) went to Spain around 1785 in the care of a cleric attached to the Irish Brigade, and joined the Spanish military service in the College of Artillery.

== Military career ==
He fought under General Ricardos in the Campaign of Roussillon against the French Republic. When the Duke of Wellington took command of the English and Spanish troops, he was attached to Wellington's staff together with General Alava. He was mentioned several times in the Duke's despatches in his campaign in Spain against Napoleon:

Despatches of Lord Wellington: (Irunzun 24 June 1813): "Mareschal del campo Don Luis Wimpfen, and the Inspector general Don Thomas O’Donoju and the officers of the staff of the Spanish army, have invariably rendered me every assistance in their power in the course of these operations; and I avail myself of this opportunity of expressing my satisfaction at their conduct, as likewise with that of Mareschal del campo Don M de Alavo and of Brigadier General Don J. O’Lawlor, who have been so long and so usefully employed with me."

Wellington specifically recommended O'Lawlor for promotion in 1814:

"to these I have to add, Brig. Gen. O'Lawlor, an officer of great merit, who has served most meritoriously during the whole war, attached to the British headquarters, and whom I had sent in the month of January last to the late Regency with dispatches, containing accounts of the military successes gained at that period. Contrary to the usual practice, he was not promoted upon that occasion, and I beg leave now to draw your Excellency's attention to his merits".

Joseph O’Lawlor was later entrusted by the Duke to manage his estate Soto de Roma which was given to him in gratitude by the Spanish Government, which he managed until 1844. O'Lawlor was present at the battles of Talavera and Arapiles and the taking of Ciudad Rodrigo. He rose to the rank of field marshal by the end of the war, and was finally promoted to lieutenant general in 1846. As well as Spanish honours, Joseph O'Lalor was awarded the British military honour of Honorary Companion of the Order of the Bath (C.B.) in 1819.

== Later career ==
At the end of the war, in 1814, he was named, first, military governor and, later, Captain General of the kingdom of Granada, an office he held until 1833. During this period, "...he was required to execute the repression orders given from Madrid to suffocate the conspiracies and rebellions of which Granada was an important focus, but he also did what he could to temper the rigors of the law on behalf of the condemned. For example, his efforts (in vain) to intervene with King Ferdinand VII in the case of Mariana Pineda to save her from the gallows (were) recognized even by foreign authors who had harshly criticized that unjust sentence. At the death of King Ferdinand, O'Lawlor resigned his post." O’Lawlor was ennobled in 1848 by the Queen and appointed a life Senator in 1849. His hidalguia, or application for ennoblement as an hidalgo solariego, was lodged in 1833 in the Archivo de la Real Chancillería de Granada, and lists five generations of ancestors of his four grandparents.

An account of his life at this time records:

"General O'Lawlor, on account of his birth, his military renown and polished education, frequented the best circles of Granada and Madrid, and his home in the former place was the rendezvous of good society. In 1834 he changed his place of residence to Madrid, residing there until his death. In 1849, one year before his death, the Queen conferred high rank upon him. As an example of his loyalty it may be stated that he refused securing his pay from the English government when attached to the British army, saying that as a Spanish soldier he would be duly recompensed by the government of his country. In reality, however, he received at the end of the campaign but a very slight part of what was owing to him. General O'Lawlor married, in 1817, Dona Donisia Caballero y Crooke, daughter of Don Juan Caballero, a gentleman of an old and noble family of Malaga, whose fortune, though still ample, had been largely diminished by the exactions of the French army."

O’Lawlor's hospitality is also reported in the memoir of English traveller Richard Ford, who visited him in Granada in the 1830s: "O’Lawlor is a sensible man, and does not bore one, but is very civil and will be of great use in every way and a banker besides. As he has to remit money to the Duke of Wellington, he is glad of good bills in London."

Joseph O'Lawlor died in Madrid on 19 October 1850.

== Family ==
Joseph O’Lawlor and Donisia Caballero y Crooke had five daughters and three sons, many of whom married into the Spanish nobility. His youngest son, Fernando O’Lawlor y Caballero (30 May 1829 – 29 March 1908), was a brigadier-general in the Spanish army during the African war and the civil war. He served as a Deputy in the Cortes and as a Senator (1893-1908). Involved in a failed plot in 1866 to remove Queen Isabella II, he was a political ally of two major Spanish liberal leaders of the time – Leopoldo O'Donnell, 1st Duke of Tetuan) and Francisco Serrano, Duke de la Torre.

His youngest daughter, María de la Encarnación O’Lawlor y Caballero (ca. 1830 – 16 July 1908), married Manuel Bermúdez de Castro y Díez (1811–1870), a senator and Minister for the Interior and Foreign Affairs. Their son Salvador Bermúdez de Castro y O'Lawlor (1 November 1863 – 20 January 1946), Duke of Ripalda and Marquis de Lema, was a prominent Spanish author, politician and nobleman. He inherited his titles from his paternal uncle. He was Minister for Foreign Affairs 1919–21, 1917, 1913–15; Mayor of Madrid 1903–4 and Governor of the Bank of Spain (1922–3). He was also the author of numerous works including De la Revolución a la Restauración, Spain since 1815 and the autobiographical Mis recuerdos 1801–1901.
