= Lawlers =

Lawlers may refer to:

== People ==
- Ernest Lawlers, a US blues guitarist, vocalist, and composer

== Places ==
- Lawlers Gold Mine, a gold mine in Western Australia
- Lawlers, Western Australia, a ghost town

== See also ==
- Lawler (disambiguation)
