= Charles McVeigh (politician) =

Irish politician

Charles McVeigh (1849 – date of death unknown) was an Irish nationalist politician and a Member of Parliament (MP) for East Donegal from 1906 to 1910.

He was elected unopposed as an Irish Parliamentary Party MP for East Donegal at the 1906 general election. He did not contest the January 1910 general election.

Parliament of the United Kingdom
| Preceded by Edward McFadden | Member of Parliament for East Donegal; 1906 – Jan. 1910 | Succeeded by Edward Kelly |
