= Edmund Dease =

Irish politician

Edmund Dease MP

Member of Parliament for Queen's County
- In office 4 January 1870 – 8 April 1880 Serving with Kenelm Thomas Digby
- Preceded by: John FitzPatrick; Kenelm Thomas Digby
- Succeeded by: Richard Lalor; Arthur O'Connor

Personal details
- Born: 6 September 1829
- Died: 17 July 1904 (aged 74)
- Party: Home Rule
- Other political affiliations: Liberal (until 1874)
- Spouse: Mary Grattan (m. 1859)
- Children: Teresa Mary; Mary; Charlotte; Edmund James; Louis George
- Parents: Gerald Dease; Elizabeth O'Callaghan
- Education: Queen's University of Ireland

Edmund Gerald Dease (6 September 1829 – 17 July 1904) was an Irish Home Rule League and Liberal politician.

He was elected Member of Parliament (MP) for Queen's County at a by-election in 1870 as a Liberal candidate, and won the seat again in 1874 as a Home Rule candidate. He then held the seat until he stood down in 1880.

Dease was educated at Queen's University of Ireland where he achieved a Master of Arts. Throughout his life, he was also a Deputy Lieutenant, Justice of the Peace, Commissioner of National Education, and member of the senate at Royal University of Ireland. His daughter was the Irish language prayer collector Charlotte Dease.

Parliament of the United Kingdom
Preceded by John FitzPatrick; Kenelm Thomas Digby	Member of Parliament for Queen's County; 1870–1880; With: Kenelm Thomas Digby	Succeeded by Richard Lalor; Arthur O'Connor
