= Eugene Crean =

Irish politician (1854–1939)

Member of Parliament for South East Cork
- In office 1900–1918
- Preceded by: Andrew Commins
- Succeeded by: Diarmuid Lynch

Member of Parliament for Queen's County Ossory
- In office 1892–1900
- Preceded by: William Archibald Macdonald
- Succeeded by: William P. Delany

Cork City Councillor
- In office 1886–1900

Mayor of Cork
- In office 1899–1900
- Preceded by: Patrick H. Meade
- Succeeded by: Daniel J. Hegarty

Personal details
- Born: 1854 Cork, Ireland
- Died: 12 January 1939 (aged 84–85) Cork, Ireland
- Party: All-for-Ireland League (1910–1918)
- Other political affiliations: Irish National Federation (1892–1900); Irish Parliamentary Party (1900–1910)

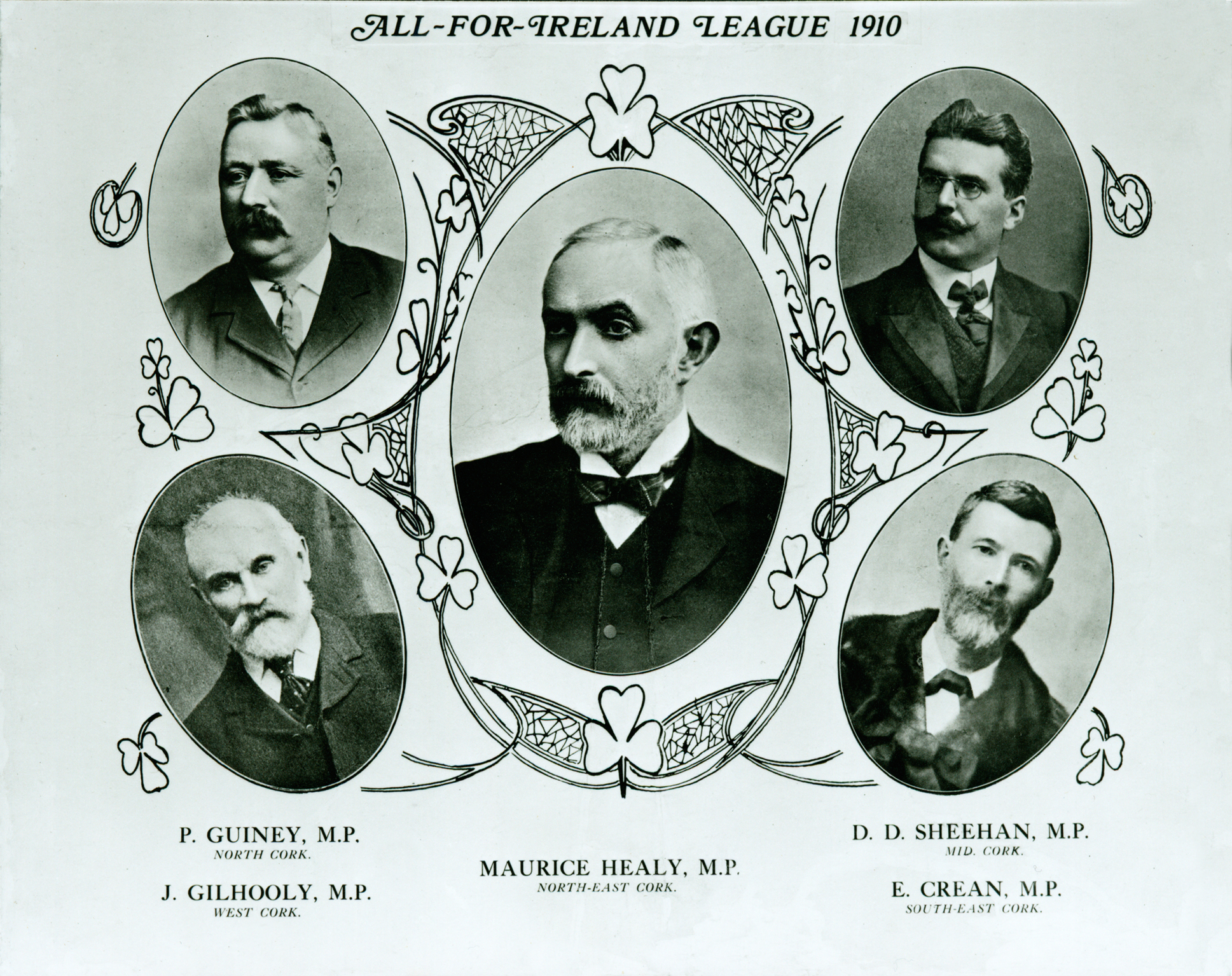
All-for-Ireland League group portrait of five of its Independent Members of Parliament, in the "Cork Free Press" 30 July 1910. These are: Patrick Guiney (North Cork), James Gilhooly (West Cork), Maurice Healy (North East Cork), D. D. Sheehan (Mid Cork), and Eugene Crean (South East Cork).

Eugene Crean (1854–1939) was an Irish nationalist politician and MP in the House of Commons of the United Kingdom of Great Britain and Ireland and member of the Irish National Federation 1892–1900, the Irish Parliamentary Party 1900–1910, for the All-for Ireland Party 1910–1918.

He was born at No. 3 Douglas Street, Cork (the house is still standing), a son of Daniel Crean. He had two brothers (Patrick and Daniel) and three sisters (Honora, Margaret and Anne). Married to Hannah FitzGerald, they had six children: Daniel, Nell, Norah, May, Kay and Thomas.

A carpenter by trade, he was involved in the trade union movement in Cork city and as a representative of the Carpenters' Society, was elected president of the Cork United Trades Workers Association. He was elected in 1886 to the Cork City Council, and was President of the Cork Trade Council in 1886 until deposed in 1890 for his opposition to Parnell in the split. He was President of the Cork County Board (1890–91).

In the 1892 general election he was chosen on the recommendation of Michael Davitt, who continued to advocate for a place for labour within the nationalist movement, as candidate for the anti-Parnellite Irish National Federation and was elected "Labour Nationalist" MP for Queen's County (Ossory Division). He retained his seat 1895–1900. Then at the suggestion of Davitt sat for South East Cork from 1900 as a member of the re-united Irish Parliamentary Party, after defeating the Healyite candidate, and was again returned in 1906. He was the last bearer of the title "Mayor of Cork" when elected in 1899, which was changed to Lord Mayor of Cork in 1900.

One of William O'Brien's closest allies, he joined with him from 1910 and was elected as an All-for-Ireland Party (AFIL) MP in both elections that year, retaining his seat until the December 1918 election when he stood down together with the other members of the AFIL party. During the previous June, when Arthur Griffith asked O’Brien to have the writ moved for his candidacy in the East Cavan by-election, O'Brien sent two AFIL MPs to Westminster where Crean moved the writ. Griffith was subsequently elected with a sizable majority.

Crean was a patron of the Gaelic Athletic Association in its early years and although a Member of Parliament for 26 years, he died in relative obscurity at his Douglas Street, Cork residence on 12 January 1939.

== Sources ==
- Stenton, Michael and Lees, Stephen, Who's Who in British Members of Parliament 1886–1918
- Maume, Patrick, The long Gestation, Irish Nationalist Life 1891–1918, "Who's Who" p. 225, Gill & Macmillan (1999) ISBN 0-7171-2744-3
- Cadogen, Tim & Falvey, Jeremiah, A Biographical Dictionary of Cork Four Courts Press (2006), ISBN 1-84682-030-8

Parliament of the United Kingdom
Preceded by William Archibald Macdonald	Member of Parliament for Queen's County Ossory; 1892 – 1900	Succeeded by William P. Delany
Preceded by Andrew Commins	Member of Parliament for South East Cork; 1900 – 1918	Succeeded by Diarmuid Lynch
