= 1916 Ossory by-election =

UK Parliamentary by-election

The 1916 Ossory by-election was held on 28 April 1916. The by-election was held due to the death of the incumbent Irish Parliamentary MP, William Delany. It was won by the Irish Parliamentary candidate John Lalor Fitzpatrick.

Ossory by-election, 1916
Party	Candidate	Votes	%	±%
Irish Parliamentary	John Lalor Fitzpatrick	2,003	55.3	N/A
Ind. Nationalist	James J. Aird	1,616	44.7	New
Majority		387	10.6	N/A
Turnout		3,619	75.6	N/A
Irish Parliamentary hold		Swing	N/A	
