= William Archibald Macdonald =

Irish politician (1841–1911)

William Archibald Macdonald (1841 – 5 October 1911) was an Irish nationalist politician and MP in the House of Commons of the United Kingdom of Great Britain and Ireland and as member of the Irish Parliamentary Party represented Queen's County Ossory, 1886–92, and a supporter of Charles Stewart Parnell. He was one of the small number of blind people who have ever been members of the UK House of Commons.

Macdonald was born at Enniskerry, County Wicklow, in 1841. He was educated in Dublin and although he lost his sight entirely at the age of 13 However, as he grew older, one day he was walking down the road and a flower pot hit him in the head. This caused fertilizer to enter his eyes and cause himself to go blind. Then, he distinguished himself at school. He entered Trinity College Dublin with a sizarship and then in 1865 gained a scholarship. He graduated M.A. with high classical honours. He took holy orders in the disestablished Church of Ireland (i.e. in 1869 or later), but later renounced them. In 1875, he married Harriett Liveing, daughter of Edward Liveing of Nayland, Suffolk, and sister of Professor Liveing F.R.S. of Cambridge.

In 1886 Macdonald was returned unopposed as the Nationalist Member of Parliament for the Ossory division of Queen's County (now County Laois). At the same time he contested West Islington in London as a Gladstone Liberal, attempting to unseat Richard Chamberlain, who like his older brother Joseph Chamberlain had deserted the Liberal party rather than vote for the First Irish Home Rule Bill, and was standing as a Liberal Unionist. Macdonald was unsuccessful; Chamberlain's majority rose slightly on a reduced poll.

When the Irish Parliamentary Party split in December 1890 over Parnell's leadership, Macdonald was part of the minority who supported Parnell.

Macdonald apparently intended to stand again at Ossory as a Parnellite at the general election of 1892, since The Times reported his candidacy. But he was not nominated, leaving the seat to be taken by an Anti-Parnellite, Eugene Crean, who easily beat the Unionist. At the 1895 general election Macdonald contested Ossory, but as an Independent Nationalist, not a Parnellite. He came a poor third behind the Unionist, with less than 10% of the votes. At this time he was living at Bray, County Wicklow.

Macdonald was reported as speaking at a public meeting at Maryborough (now Portlaoise), in the Ossory constituency, on the report of the Financial Relations Commission in January 1897. But he did not stand for Parliament again. He died at Chalfont St Peter, Buckinghamshire, on 5 October 1911.

== Sources ==
- F. W. S. Craig, British Parliamentary Election Results 1885-1918, London, Macmillan, 1974
- Irish Times, 6 October 1911
- F. S. L. Lyons, The Fall of Parnell 1890-91, London, Routledge & Kegan Paul, 1960
- The Times, 23 June & 8 July 1886, 5 July 1892, 12 January 1897
- Brian M. Walker (ed.), Parliamentary Election Results in Ireland, 1801-1922, Dublin, Royal Irish Academy, 1978

Parliament of the United Kingdom
| Preceded by Stephen O'Mara | Member of Parliament for Queen's County Ossory; 1886 – 1892 | Succeeded by Eugene Crean |
