= 1913 Leix by-election =

UK Parliamentary by-election

The 1913 Leix by-election was held in Leix on 9 June 1913. The by-election was held due to the death of the incumbent Irish Parliamentary MP, Patrick Aloysius Meehan. It was won by his son the Irish Parliamentary candidate Patrick Joseph Meehan, who was unopposed.
