= John Lalor Fitzpatrick =

John Lalor Fitzpatrick (1875 – 8 December 1956) was Irish Parliamentary Party MP for Queen's County Ossory from 1916 to 1918.

He was the grandson of the MP for Queen's County Leix Richard Lalor, whose brother was James Fintan Lalor.

Parliament of the United Kingdom
| Preceded by William P. Delany | Member of Parliament for Queen's County Ossory; 1916 – 1918 | Constituency abolished |
