= Mark MacDonnell =

Irish politician

Mark Antony MacDonnell (1854 – 9 July 1906) was an Irish nationalist politician and Member of Parliament (MP) in the House of Commons of the United Kingdom of Great Britain and Ireland.

He was elected as the Irish National Federation (Anti-Parnellite) MP for the Queen's County Leix constituency at the 1892 general election, and was re-elected unopposed at the 1895 general election. He was elected as the Irish Parliamentary Party MP at the 1900 general election. He did not contest the 1906 general election.

Parliament of the United Kingdom
Preceded by Richard Lalor	Member of Parliament for Queen's County Leix; 1892 – 1906	Succeeded by Patrick Meehan
