= Stephen M. O'Mara =

Irish republican politician

Mayor of Limerick
- In office March 1921 – October 1923

Personal details
- Born: 28 December 1883 Limerick, Ireland
- Died: 11 November 1959 (aged 75) Limerick, Ireland
- Party: Sinn Féin; Fianna Fáil
- Spouse: Nancy O'Brien (m. 1918)
- Children: 1
- Parent: Stephen O'Mara (father)
- Relatives: James O'Mara (brother); Phons O'Mara (brother); Ellen Sullivan (sister)
- Education: CBS Sexton Street; Clongowes Wood College

Stephen Mary O'Mara (28 December 1883 – 11 November 1959) was an Irish businessman and republican politician in Limerick.

O'Mara was the third son of Stephen O'Mara, Snr, a former Mayor of Limerick and briefly an Irish Parliamentary Party MP. Stephen Jnr married Nancy O'Brien and had a son, Peter. His elder brother James was an early supporter of Sinn Féin, which Stephen also joined after the Easter Rising. He was a member of Limerick Corporation when the Irish War of Independence began. The Mayor of Limerick, George Clancy, was killed by the Black and Tans on 7 March 1921, and O'Mara was elected in his place on 22 March. His brother Phons O'Mara was mayor of Limerick from 1918 to 1920.

In May, he went to the United States to replace his brother James as "fiscal agent" raising Dáil funds for the Irish Republic. He was re-elected mayor in January 1922, and opposed the Anglo-Irish Treaty. The fact that Dáil Éireann funds in the US were in O'Mara's name as trustee caused legal difficulties for the pro-Treaty administration.

In March 1922, there was a stand-off in Limerick city between pro-Treaty and anti-Treaty units of the Irish Republican Army during the transfer of bases by the withdrawing British Army. O'Mara negotiated a resolution to this. In May 1922, O'Mara established a Limerick City Police Force to replace the withdrawn Royal Irish Constabulary. In June a general Civil War broke out across the nascent Irish Free State. The City Police Force was replaced in July by the Free State Civic Guard. O'Mara was interned by the Free State in November, but re-elected mayor in January 1923; he was released in March. He resigned as mayor in October, after the Civil War had ended in defeat for the anti-Treaty side.

O'Mara was a loyal supporter of Éamon de Valera, who was staying at his home of Strand House the night the Treaty was signed. O'Mara himself was still in the US with Harry Boland. The evening before the 1922 general election, de Valera, O'Mara, and Boland dined together and discussed a possible grand coalition government. O'Mara joined Fianna Fáil on its formation in 1926. He was a member of the Commission of Vocational Organisations from 1933 to 1943. His expanded the family bacon business, opening factories in Claremorris and Letterkenny. When de Valera won the 1959 election to become President, he appointed O'Mara to the Council of State. O'Mara died less than two months later in the Mater Hospital, Dublin.

Civic offices
Preceded by George Clancy	Mayor of Limerick; 1921–1923	Succeeded by Bob de Courcy
