= Edward McFadden =

Irish politician

Edward McFadden (1862–1922) was an Irish nationalist lawyer and politician from Letterkenny in County Donegal. Educated at St Eunan's Seminary in Letterkenny, and at the Catholic University of Ireland, he served as solicitor to Letterkenny Urban Rural and Milford Rural District Councils, and to Donegal District Lunatic Asylum, and as coroner for the Kilmacrenan Division of County Donegal.

He was the chairman of Donegal County Council from 1899 to 1902, chairman of Letterkenny Urban Council 1898–1903.

He was member of parliament (MP) in the House of Commons of the United Kingdom of Great Britain and Ireland.

He was elected as the Irish Parliamentary Party MP for the East Donegal constituency at the 1900 general election. He did not contest the 1906 general election.

Parliament of the United Kingdom
Preceded by Arthur O'Connor	Member of Parliament for East Donegal; 1900 – 1906	Succeeded by Charles McVeigh
