= Lawler =

Lawler may refer to:

== People ==
- Lawler (surname)

== Places in the United States ==
- Lawler, Illinois, an unincorporated community
- Lawler, Iowa, a city
- Lawler, Minnesota, an unincorporated community

== See also ==
- Lawlers (disambiguation)
- Lawlor (disambiguation)
