= William Delany (politician) =

British politician

Member of Parliament for Queen's County Ossory
- In office 1900–1916
- Preceded by: Eugene Crean
- Succeeded by: John Lalor Fitzpatrick

Personal details
- Born: 1855
- Died: 7 March 1916 (aged 60–61)

William P. Delany (1855 – 7 March 1916) was an Irish Member of Parliament (MP) representing Queen's County Ossory, from 1900 to 1916. He was one of the founders of the United Irish League.

Parliament of the United Kingdom
Preceded by Eugene Crean	Member of Parliament for Queen's County Ossory; 1900–1916	Succeeded by John Lalor Fitzpatrick
