= Edward Kelly (Irish nationalist politician) =

Irish nationalist politician (1883–1944)

- Kelly, c.1910

Member of Parliament for East Donegal
- In office January 1910 – November 1922
- Preceded by: Charles McVeigh
- Succeeded by: Constituency abolished

Personal details
- Born: 31 March 1883 Ballyshannon, County Donegal, Ireland
- Died: 25 September 1944 (aged 61)
- Education: Royal University of Ireland; King's Inns

Edward Joseph Kelly (31 March 1883 – 25 September 1944) was an Irish nationalist politician and Member of Parliament in the House of Commons of the United Kingdom of Great Britain and Ireland. He was a solicitor, barrister-at-law and Senior Counsel (SC).

He was the son of Peter Kelly JP of Ballyshannon, County Donegal, and of Rose Kelly. Born at Ballyshannon, he was educated at St Vincent's College, Castleknock and at the Royal University, Dublin, where he obtained a M.A. in 1904. He later lectured at the Royal University in Modern History and also lectured and examined in Economics at the Royal College of Science, St Stephen's Green. He was called to the bar in 1917, made a Senior Counsel of the Irish Free State in 1930, and became a Bencher of the King's Inns, Dublin in 1937. He specialised particularly in company and local government law. He married Mollie, second daughter of William Hickey of Clontarf.

He was first elected as an Irish Parliamentary Party MP at the January 1910 UK general election for the constituency of East Donegal, defeating the Unionist candidate Thomas Harrison by 3,415 votes to 2,202. He was then returned unopposed in the December 1910 UK general election. At the 1918 general election he was the beneficiary of an electoral pact brokered by Cardinal Michael Logue under which eight seats in northern Ireland were allocated either to the Irish Parliamentary Party or to Sinn Féin and not contested by the other. In the election Kelly obtained 7,596 votes to the Unionist's 4,797. An unofficial Sinn Féin candidate broke the pact but obtained a mere 46 votes. Following the election, Kelly chose not to be a member of the First Dáil but remained active in the UK House of Commons representing East Donegal until his retirement in October 1922 on the establishment of the Irish Free State.

He was an unsuccessful Cumann na nGaedheal candidate at the September 1927 general election for the Donegal constituency.

== Sources ==
- Kenneth Ferguson (ed.) King's Inns Barristers, 1868–2004, Dublin, Honorable Society of King's Inns in Association with the Irish Legal History Society, 2005
- Michael Stenton & Stephen Lees, Who's Who of British Members of Parliament, Vol.2 1886–1918, Harvester Press, Sussex, 1978
- Brian M. Walker (ed.) Parliamentary Election Results in Ireland, 1801–1922, Royal Irish Academy, Dublin, 1978

Parliament of the United Kingdom
Preceded by Charles McVeigh	Member of Parliament for East Donegal; 1910–1922	Constituency abolished
