= Charlotte Dease =

Anthropologist, poet, translator and collector

- Born: 20 July 1873; Ballybrittas, Laois
- Died: 5 May 1953 (aged 79); Dublin, Ireland

Charlotte Dease (20 July 1873 – 5 May 1953), was a collector of old Irish prayers who also wrote and translated books on the saints.

== Biography ==
Charlotte Dease was born the middle of five children to Edmund Gerald Dease and Mary Grattan on 20 July 1873. Her father was a Member of Parliament and a national education commissioner. He was a supporter of the Land League. Dease was a member of the Feis Laoise and Ossory and of the Ard-Fheis in 1907. She was particularly interested in traditional prayers. She published various collections of prayers from 1911 on. They were translated from 1915. Introductions to the works were given by Sir Henry Bellingham and Douglas Hyde. She also translated books from Italian for the English speaking market. During the Commemoration of Catholic Emancipation Dease represented the Central Catholic Library. Dease also wrote for magazines like the Irish Messenger and The Sacred Heart Review.

Dease died 5 May 1953 at 31 Pembroke Road, Dublin.

== Bibliography ==
- Prayers of the People
- Irish Rosary
- Scenes of the Rosary
- The Little flowers of St Catherine of Siena
- An Alphabet of Irish saints
- Children of the Gael
- An Irish Nativity Play
