= Knocknagow =

1879 novel by Charles Kickham

- First edition
- Author: Charles Kickham
- Language: English
- Genre: Sentimental novel
- Set in: Southern County Tipperary, 1858 (Note: At one point it is mentioned that the "big snow" occurred three years prior, referring to the snowstorms of 1855.)
- Publisher: James Duffy
- Publication date: 1879
- Publication place: Ireland
- Media type: Print: hardback
- Pages: 628
- Dewey Decimal: 823.8
- LC Class: PR4839.K365 K5

Knocknagow, or The Homes of Tipperary /ˈnɒknəˌɡaʊ/ is an 1879 novel by the Irish nationalist Charles Kickham.

== Background ==
Kickham wrote Knocknagow in the aftermath of his 1869 release from Woking Prison after serving 3 1/2 years in prison for treason.

== Plot ==
Greed and the Land Laws work the depopulation of a County Tipperary village.

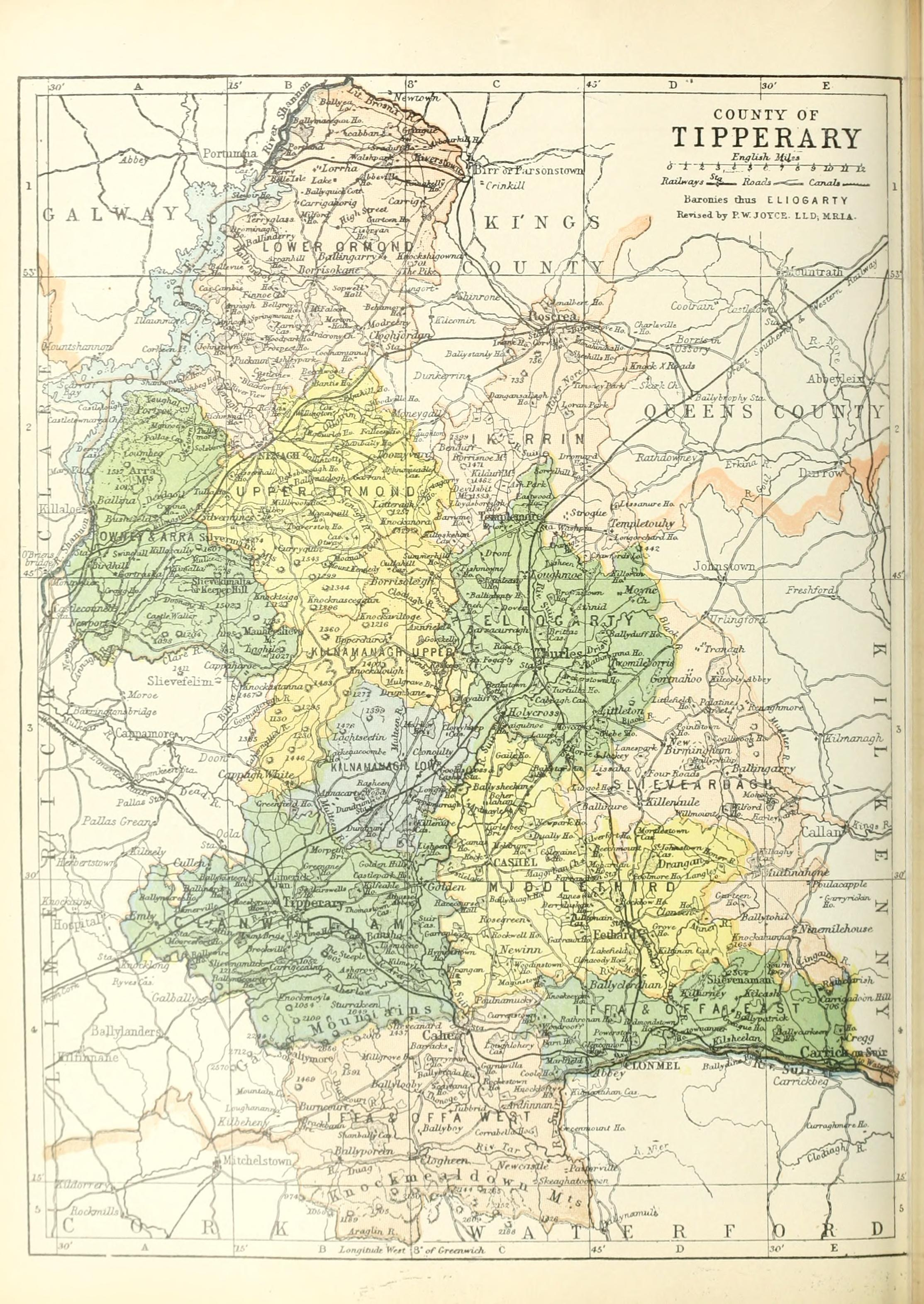
Map of County Tipperary, 1900.

== Characters ==
- Mary Kearney
- Mrs Kearney
- Hugh Kearney
- Maurice Kearney
- Ned Brophy
- Beresford Pender
- Mick Brian
- Peg Brady
- Tom Hogan
- Billy Heffernan
- Phil Lahy
- Norah Lahy
- Honor Lahy
- Bessy Morris
- Grace Kiely
- Barney "Wattletoes" Broderick
- Mat "the Thresher" Donovan

== Reception and legacy ==
The book sold over 70,000 copies, and is Kickham's most famous and successful.

Matthew Russell of ExClassics.com wrote of it, "For many years Knocknagow was the book - along with a prayerbook and Old Moore's Almanac -- most likely to be found in any Irish home. [...] Yeats described it as "The most honest of Irish novels" and Con Houlihan as "The greatest Irish novel." For all its sentimentality and inept plotting, it gives a very accurate picture of rural Irish life in the nineteenth century. Furthermore, it is one of the few such novels which was written by one of the ordinary people. Almost all the other writers who dealt with the rural poor were either of the landlord class themselves (Lady Gregory, J. M. Synge, Somerville and Ross, Emily Lawless, Maria Edgeworth) or urban Protestant middle-class (George A. Birmingham, Charles Lever, Dion Boucicault, Samuel Lover). However sympathetic and well-written their accounts, they were written from the outside looking in. Knocknagow was written from the inside."

In 1941, Seán Ó Faoláin wrote of Knocknagow, “This spirited and idealised novel, Knocknagow, written by a fenian who had been in jail, with the whole land question running through it, came in the precise moment that demanded such a book, and it was exactly of the right spirit for a people emerging from bad times. 'Thank God, there are happy homes in Tipperary still,' are the last spoken words of the novel, and they measure its qualified optimism.”

The community centre in Mullinahone is named Knocknagow Community Centre in honour of the novel.

== Adaptations ==
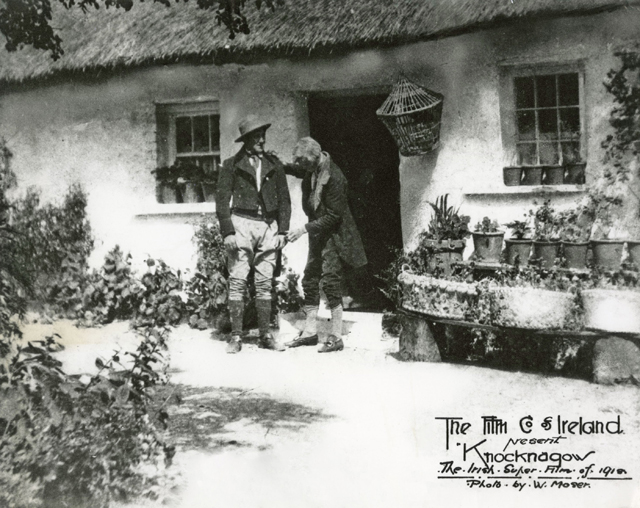
Still from the 1918 silent film written by Ellen Sullivan.

A 1918 silent film adaptation was written by Ellen Sullivan.

In 1968, a stage version was written by Séamus de Búrca.
