= Queen's County Leix =

Former parliamentary constituency in the United Kingdom

- Former county constituency for the House of Commons

1885–1918
- Seats: 1
- Created from: Queen's County and Portarlington
- Replaced by: Queen's County

Leix, a division of Queen's County, was a constituency in Ireland, returning one Member of Parliament to the United Kingdom House of Commons from 1885 to 1918.

Prior to the 1885 general election and after the dissolution of Parliament in 1918 the area was part of the Queen's County constituency. From the time of Irish independence, it was not represented in the UK Parliament, as Laois was no longer part of the United Kingdom.

== Boundaries ==
This constituency comprised the eastern part of Queen's County now known as County Laois.

The Redistribution of Seats Act 1885 defined the division as including the Baronies of Ballyadams, Cullenagh, Maryborough East, Slievemargy, and Stradbally, and that part of the Barony of Portnahinch not contained within the Queen's County Ossory.

== Members of Parliament ==
Election	Member	Party
1885	Richard Lalor	Irish Parliamentary Party
1892	Mark MacDonnell	Anti-Parnellite Nationalist
1900	Mark MacDonnell	Irish Parliamentary Party
1906	Patrick Aloysius Meehan	Irish Parliamentary Party
1913 by-election	Patrick Joseph Meehan	Irish Parliamentary Party
1918	Constituency merged into Queen's County	

== Elections ==
=== Elections in the 1880s ===
General election 2 December 1885: Queen's County Leix
Party	Candidate	Votes	%	±%
Irish Parliamentary	Richard Lalor	3,750	88.1	
Irish Conservative	Robert Ashworth Godolphin Cosby	507	11.9	
Majority		3,243	76.2	
Turnout		4,257	77.8	
Registered electors		5,472		
Irish Parliamentary win (new seat)				

General election 14 July 1886: Queen's County Leix
Party	Candidate	Votes	%	±%
Irish Parliamentary	Richard Lalor	3,528	89.7	+1.6
Irish Conservative	Robert Ashworth Godolphin Cosby	406	10.3	−1.6
Majority		3,122	79.4	+3.2
Turnout		3,934	71.9	−5.9
Registered electors		5,472		
Irish Parliamentary hold		Swing	+1.6	

=== Elections in the 1890s ===
General election 13 July 1892: Queen's County Leix
Party	Candidate	Votes	%	±%
Irish National Federation	Mark MacDonnell	3,261	85.3	−4.4
Irish Unionist	Robert Ashworth Godolphin Cosby	513	14.7	+4.4
Majority		2,748	70.6	−8.8
Turnout		3,774	60.8	−11.1
Registered electors		6,288		
Irish National Federation gain from Irish Parliamentary		Swing	−4.4	

General election 17 July 1895: Queen's County Leix
Party	Candidate	Votes	%	±%
Irish National Federation	Mark MacDonnell	Unopposed		
Registered electors		5,128		
Irish National Federation hold				

=== Elections in the 1900s ===
General election 4 October 1900: Queen's County Leix
Party	Candidate	Votes	%	±%
Irish Parliamentary	Mark MacDonnell	Unopposed		
Registered electors		6,231		
Irish Parliamentary hold				

General election 19 January 1906: Queen's County Leix
Party	Candidate	Votes	%	±%
Irish Parliamentary	Patrick Aloysius Meehan	Unopposed		
Registered electors		4,867		
Irish Parliamentary hold				

=== Elections in the 1910s ===
General election 20 January 1910: Queen's County Leix
Party	Candidate	Votes	%	±%
Irish Parliamentary	Patrick Aloysius Meehan	Unopposed		
Registered electors		4,872		
Irish Parliamentary hold				

General election 8 December 1910: Queen's County Leix
Party	Candidate	Votes	%	±%
Irish Parliamentary	Patrick Aloysius Meehan	Unopposed		
Registered electors		4,872		
Irish Parliamentary hold				

By-Election 9 June 1913: Queen's County Leix
Party	Candidate	Votes	%	±%
Irish Parliamentary	Patrick Joseph Meehan	Unopposed		
Registered electors		4,785		
Irish Parliamentary hold				
