= Patrick Meehan (Irish politician, born 1877) =

Irish solicitor and politician (1877–1929)

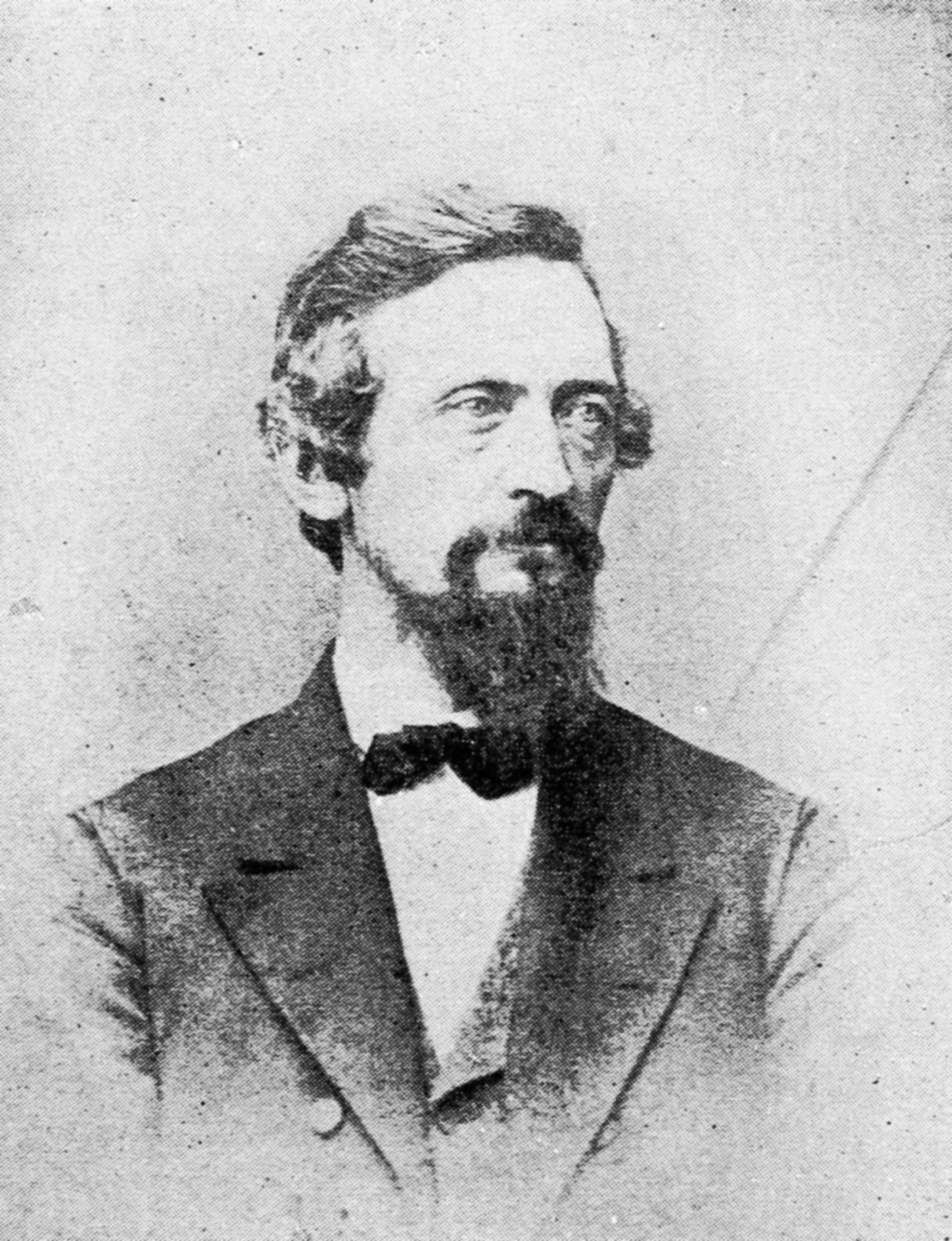

Patrick Joseph Meehan (28 March 1877 – 5 July 1929) was an Irish solicitor, politician, who was an Irish Parliamentary Party MP. He represented Queen's County in the House of Commons of the United Kingdom of Great Britain and Ireland from 1913 to 1918. He was returned unopposed following the death of his predecessor, his father Patrick Aloysius Meehan.

During his time as an MP, he followed his father's policy of calling for land redistribution, which caused some controversy.

His constituency was abolished at the next general election in 1918.

After the establishment of the Irish Free State, he was appointed state solicitor for Laois and later became country registrar. He was involved in sports, particularly Irish coursing, and owned many well-known greyhounds.

He died at his home at Annebrook, Portlaoise, on 5 July 1929, aged 52.

Parliament of the United Kingdom
Preceded by Patrick Meehan	Member of Parliament for Queen's County Leix; 1913 – 1918	Constituency abolished
