= 1870 Queen's County by-election =

UK Parliamentary by-election

The 1870 Queen's County by-election was fought on 4 January 1870. The by-election was fought due to the elevation to the peerage of the incumbent Liberal MP John Wilson FitzPatrick. It was won by the unopposed Liberal candidate Edmund Dease.
