= James Mark Sullivan =

American diplomat, film maker (1873–1935)

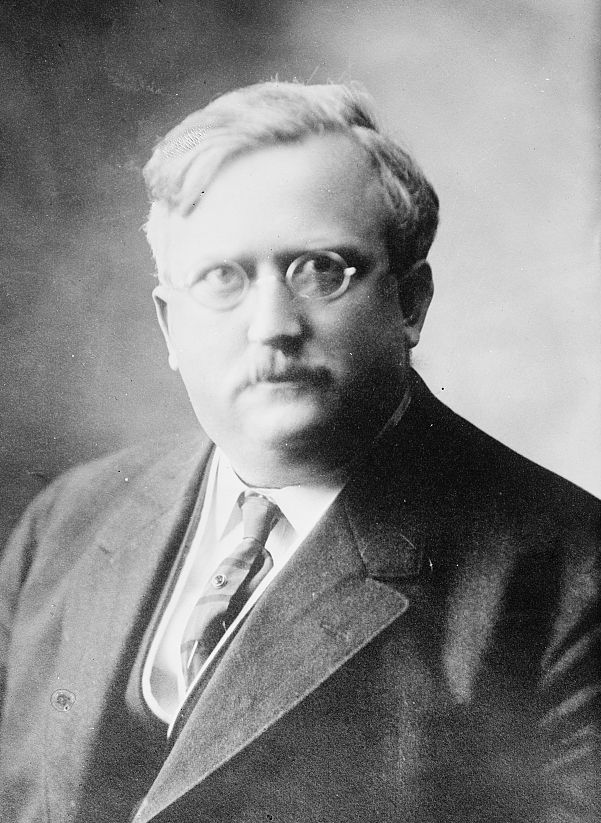

United States Ambassador to the Dominican Republic
- In office September 23, 1913 – June 20, 1915
- President: Woodrow Wilson
- Preceded by: William W. Russell
- Succeeded by: William W. Russell

Personal details
- Born: January 6, 1873
- Died: August 15, 1935 (aged 62) St. Petersburg, Florida, U.S.

James Mark Sullivan (January 6, 1873 – August 15, 1935) was a lawyer and the envoy extraordinary and minister plenipotentiary to Santo Domingo under Woodrow Wilson. He was arrested in Dublin in 1916 for aiding the Irish rebellion.

== Biography ==
He was born in County Kerry, Ireland, on January 6, 1873. He emigrated to the United States with his family when he was a boy, and he became a lawyer and prize fight promoter there. He married Ellen O'Mara in 1910.

In March 1916, along with his wife, he and Henry M. Fitzgibbon founded the Film Company of Ireland. In 1919 his son caught typhoid and Ellen caught the disease and died. The film company ended the following year once the three films in production had been completed.

He served during turbulent times in the history of the Dominican Republic and was recalled to Washington at least once because "his services have not been wholly satisfactory". He was appointed August 12, 1913. While he was in the Dominican Republic, Sullivan built up close relationships with the Banco Nacional de Santo Domingo, a private bank founded by Samuel M. Jarvis. He carried out his office work from the bank's premises, kept an overdraft account with it, and turned to its president, Frank J. R. Mitchell, for advice on diplomatic issues. Sullivan instructed the transfer of a public works fund from the banker Santiago Michelena to the bank and also pressured the receiver general, Walker W. Vick, to transfer the customs receivership account. Vick refused and repeatedly complained to the State Department about Sullivan's actions. These complaints eventually led to an investigation led by James D. Phelan, which took place between January and April 1915 and examined Sullivan's activities, including his connection with the bank. The investigation report called for Sullivan's resignation, and, as a result, he left the post on June 20, 1915.

Sullivan was mistakenly reported as dead in August 1920 by several American newspapers, including the Hartford Courant, which published his obituary on the front page of its August 24 issue and eulogized him as "the diplomat of the tropics" and the man "who originated shirtsleeve statesmanship" for his work as the U.S. minister to the Dominican Republic. Three days later, the Courant printed a correction and informed people that "The report this week originated in the 'New Haven Journal-Courier.'" Fifteen years to the month later, the Courant gave the report of his actual death and eulogized him as being "recalled throughout Connecticut tonight as one of the most colorful figures ever a part of the state's history."

He was a friend of Michael Collins. He died in St. Petersburg, Florida, on August 15, 1935.
