= Krista Lawlor =

American philosopher

Academic background
- Education: University of New Hampshire (BA), Tufts University (MA), University of Michigan (PhD)

Academic work
- Discipline: Philosophy
- Institutions: Stanford University
- Main interests: philosophy of mind

Krista Lawlor is an American philosopher and Henry Waldgrave Stuart Memorial Professor of Philosophy at Stanford University.

She is known for her works on philosophy of mind and epistemology.

== Books ==
- New Thoughts about Old Things: Cognitive Policies as the Ground of Singular Concepts, Garland Publishing, 2001.
- Assurance: An Austinian View of Knowledge and Knowledge Claims, Oxford University Press, 2013.
- Being Reasonable: The Case for a Misunderstood Virtue, Harvard University Press, 2026.
