= James O'Mara (councillor) =

Irish politician (1817–1899)

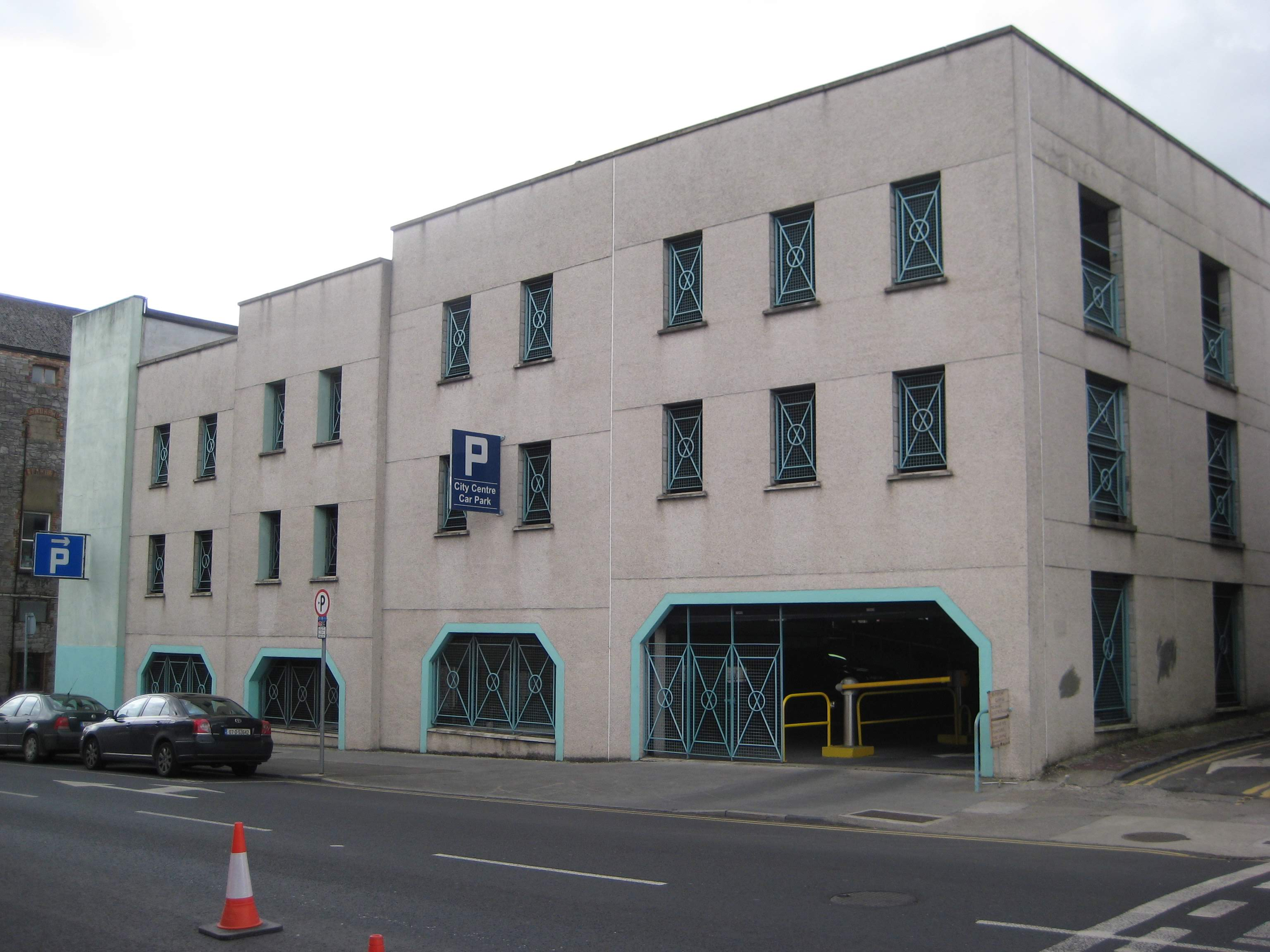
Site of O'Mara's Bacon Company Limerick, now a car park

James O'Mara (formerly O'Meara; 1817–1899) was a nationalist politician, justice of the peace and businessman in Limerick.

O'Mara was born in 1817 in Toomyvara, County Tipperary. Moving to Limerick city, he established O'Mara's Bacon Company in 1839. He changed his name to "O'Mara" in order to shorten it for commercial purposes. He became one of the prominent businessmen of the city.

In 1841 he married Hanora Foley. Their children included the future Mayor of Limerick, MP and Senator, Stephen O'Mara.

O'Mara was an early supporter of Isaac Butt's Home Rule movement. He was a member (with his son Stephen) of the Butt Committee, which successfully promoted Butt's election for Limerick city, in the bye-election of 20 September 1871. He is listed in contributors to "The Butt Testimonial".

He became a Limerick Poor Law Guardian and is described as such when appointed as High Sheriff of Limerick City for 1887.

On 26 November 1887, while High Sheriff, he received an Irish American Fenian who delivered an oration at the unveiling of a memorial to the Fenian Manchester Martyrs of November 1867. His son Stephen (who was a Fenian in his younger years) was also present. James O'Mara was succeeded for 1888 as High Sheriff by Stephen.

O'Mara was a Town Councillor on Limerick Corporation for the Dock Ward at least 1888 to 1898. O’Mara was also a member of the Limerick Harbour Commissioners, a Governor of the Fever Hospital, and a Trustee of the Limerick Savings Bank. He was nominated for Mayor of Limerick but declined. He was a Justice of the Peace (also described as Magistrate of Limerick and a Visiting Justice of the Male and Female Prisons) as of 1893 and remained in that post up to his death in 1899.
