= Patt Lalor (Queen's County MP) =

Patrick "Patt" Lalor (1781–1856) was a political leader in Queen's County, Ireland and the father of revolutionary politicians James Fintan Lalor, Peter Lalor and Richard Lalor. He was the first Catholic elected to the House of Commons to represent Queen's County (1832–1835) in over two centuries and a loyal supporter of the Repeal Association led by Daniel O'Connell.

== Biography ==
Lalor first came to prominence as a leader of the resistance to tithes in Queen's County during the Tithe War 1831–1836 when he refused to pay tithes to support the Church of Ireland and allowed his sheep to be confiscated as a result. Lalor declared at a public meeting in February 1831 in Maryborough that "...he would never again pay tithes; that he would violate no law; that the tithe men might take his property, and offer it for sale; but his countrymen, he was proud to say, respected him, and he thought that none of them would buy or bid for it if exposed for sale. The declaration was received by the meeting in various ways: by many with surprise and astonishment; by others with consternation and dismay, but by a vast majority with tremendous cheering." Lalor held true to his word and did not resist the confiscation of 20 sheep from his farm, but was able to ensure no buyers appeared at subsequent auctions.

Following Catholic emancipation, he was elected to the House of Commons in 1832 but narrowly defeated in 1835. In his later years, he served as a justice of the peace for Queen's County and as a prominent member of the Tenant Right League supporting land reform. He died at his residence "Tenakill" near Mountrath on 10 April 1856 aged 75. Patt Lalor married Anne Dillon (died 4 June 1835), the daughter of Patrick Dillon of Sheane, and had 13 children. After her death, he married Ellen Mary Anne Loughnan with whom he had no children. His son Richard Lalor and great-grandson John Lalor Fitzpatrick also represented Queen's County in the House of Commons. His first cousins included Alice Lalor, the American religious leader, Dr Joseph Lalor the reformist Medical Superintendent of the Richmond District Lunatic Asylum, and Joseph O'Lawlor the Spanish general and military Governor of Granada.

Parliament of the United Kingdom
Preceded by Sir Henry Parnell; Sir Charles Coote, Bt	Member of Parliament for Queen's County; 1832 – 1835; With: Sir Charles Coote, Bt	Succeeded by Sir Charles Coote, Bt; Hon. Thomas Vesey
