= East Donegal (UK Parliament constituency) =

UK parliamentary constituency in Ireland, 1885–1922

- Former county constituency for the House of Commons

1885–1922
- Seats: 1
- Created from: County Donegal
- Replaced by: Donegal

East Donegal was a UK Parliament constituency in County Donegal, Ireland, returning one Member of Parliament from 1885 to 1922.

Prior to the 1885 general election, the area was part of the County Donegal constituency. From 1922, on the establishment of the Irish Free State, it was not represented in the UK Parliament.

== Boundaries ==
This constituency comprised the eastern part of County Donegal, consisting of the baronies of Raphoe North and Raphoe South, that part of the barony of Inishowen West contained within the parish of Burt, and that part of the barony of Kilmacrenan not contained within the constituencies of North Donegal or West Donegal.

== Members of Parliament ==
Election	Member	Party
1885	Arthur O'Connor (Note: Also elected for Queen's County Ossory, but chose to sit for East Donegal.)	Irish Parliamentary Party
1892	Arthur O'Connor	Anti-Parnellite Nationalist
1895	Arthur O'Connor	Anti-Parnellite Nationalist
1900	Edward McFadden	Irish Parliamentary Party
1906	Charles McVeigh	Irish Parliamentary Party
1910 (January)	Edward Kelly	Irish Parliamentary Party
1918	Edward Kelly	Irish Parliamentary Party
1922	UK constituency abolished – see Donegal (Dáil constituency)	

== Elections ==
=== Elections in the 1880s ===
1885 general election: East Donegal
Party	Candidate	Votes	%	±%
Irish Parliamentary	Arthur O'Connor	4,089	57.7	
Liberal	Thomas Lea	2,992	42.3	
Majority		1,097	15.4	
Turnout		7,081	90.3	
Registered electors		7,840		
Irish Parliamentary win (new seat)				

1886 general election: East Donegal
Party	Candidate	Votes	%	±%
Irish Parliamentary	Arthur O'Connor	3,972	60.9	+3.2
Irish Conservative	Thomas Butler Stoney	2,551	39.1	New
Majority		1,421	21.8	+6.4
Turnout		6,523	83.2	−7.1
Registered electors		7,840		
Irish Parliamentary hold		Swing		

=== Elections in the 1890s ===
1892 general election: East Donegal
Party	Candidate	Votes	%	±%
Irish National Federation	Arthur O'Connor	3,546	56.0	−4.9
Liberal Unionist	Emerson Tennent Herdman	2,783	44.0	+4.9
Majority		763	12.0	N/A
Turnout		6,329	89.8	+6.6
Registered electors		7,051		
Irish National Federation gain from Irish Parliamentary		Swing		

1895 general election: East Donegal
Party	Candidate	Votes	%	±%
Irish National Federation	Arthur O'Connor	3,392	55.4	−0.6
Liberal Unionist	Emerson Tennent Herdman	2,729	44.6	+0.6
Majority		663	10.8	−1.2
Turnout		6,121	88.7	−1.1
Registered electors		6,901		
Irish National Federation hold		Swing	−0.6	

=== Elections in the 1900s ===
1900 general election: East Donegal
Party	Candidate	Votes	%	±%
Irish Parliamentary	Edward McFadden	3,113	53.9	−1.5
Irish Unionist	John Fitzpatrick Cooke	2,660	46.0	+1.4
Majority		453	7.9	−2.9
Turnout		5,773	72.6	−16.1
Registered electors		7,950		
Irish Parliamentary hold		Swing	−1.5	

1906 general election: East Donegal
Party	Candidate	Votes	%	±%
Irish Parliamentary	Charles McVeigh	Unopposed		
Irish Parliamentary hold				

=== Elections in the 1910s ===
January 1910 general election: East Donegal
Party	Candidate	Votes	%	±%
Irish Parliamentary	Edward Kelly	3,415	60.8	N/A
Irish Unionist	Thomas Harrison	2,202	39.2	New
Majority		1,213	21.6	N/A
Turnout		5,617	87.0	N/A
Registered electors		6,454		
Irish Parliamentary hold		Swing	N/A	

December 1910 general election: East Donegal
Party	Candidate	Votes	%	±%
Irish Parliamentary	Edward Kelly	Unopposed		
Irish Parliamentary hold				

1918 general election: East Donegal
Party	Candidate	Votes	%	±%
Irish Parliamentary	Edward Kelly	7,596	61.1	N/A
Irish Unionist	Robert Moore	4,797	38.6	New
Sinn Féin	Samuel O'Flaherty	46	0.4	New
Majority		2,799	22.5	N/A
Turnout		12,439	77.7	N/A
Registered electors		16,015		
Irish Parliamentary hold		Swing	N/A	

== Sources ==
Walker, B.M., ed. (1978). Parliamentary Election Results in Ireland, 1801–1922. Dublin: Royal Irish Academy. ISBN 0901714127.
