= Patrick Meehan (Irish politician, born 1852) =

Patrick Aloysius Meehan (1852 – 10 May 1913) was an Irish Parliamentary Party MP for Leix Division of Queen's County, Ireland in the Parliament of the United Kingdom of Great Britain and Ireland from the 1906 election until his death. He was succeeded as MP by his son Patrick Joseph Meehan, a solicitor, who was returned unopposed to the constituency.

Meehan married in 1874 and had eight sons and two daughters. His profession was a wine and spirit merchant.

In May 1880 he was chairman of Maryborough Town Commissioners where he helped set up the local Land League. He subsequently joined the National Land League.

He was a member of the Committee of Management of Queen's County Asylum and chairman of the county council of Queen's County. In addition he held the chairs of the

- Committee of Agriculture and Technical Instruction
- Queen's County Infirmary Committee.

Parliament of the United Kingdom
Preceded by Mark MacDonnell	Member of Parliament for Leix Division of Queen's County; 1906 – 1913	Succeeded by Patrick Meehan
