= Elisabeth Curtis O'Sullivan =

American and British painter and writer

- Born: Elisabeth or Elizabeth Curtis; 1865; San Francisco, California
- Died: 16 June 1951 (aged 85)
- Other names: Bessie Curtis, Mrs. Denis O'Sullivan, Mrs. C. D. O'Sullivan
- Occupations: Painter, writer, interpreter
- Spouse: Cornelius Denis O'Sullivan

Elisabeth "Bessie" Curtis O'Sullivan (1865–1951) was an American painter and writer. As a playwright, she wrote under the pseudonym Patrick Bidwell. For most of her life, she moved between the United States and England, often living abroad. After her marriage, she settled mainly in London. During World War I, she was a Flemish interpreter and worked as part of the war relief effort.

== Biography ==
=== Early life and family ===
Elisabeth (Note: "Elisabeth" with an "s" is how she signed her name on official records, including passport applications. Some newspapers and books use the spelling "Elizabeth" with a "z". The former is used here for consistency.) Curtis was born in San Francisco in 1865 to parents Charlotte Agnes Kidder and James Marvin Curtis. Growing up in San Francisco, she showed an interest in art at a young age. She was friends with Kathleen Thompson, later Kathleen Norris, during her childhood. She had a younger sister, Helen Curtis, who sometimes posed for her art. Her aunt Mary Curtis Richardson was a prominent portrait painter who encouraged her art-making, and her uncle was Benoni Irwin.

=== Art career ===
Elisabeth, also known as "Bessie", was a painter of portraits, miniatures, figures, and landscapes. Early on in her art career, she established studios in both San Francisco and Bolinas, California. In 1885, she was a founding member of the San Francisco Art Student's League, where she also taught. She met fellow artist Cornelius Denis "Neely" O'Sullivan at her studio in the League, becoming close with him while they studied art.

She left San Francisco in 1892, with plans to study in Europe for a year with other members from the Art Student's League, Laura Voormand and Julia Heynemann. While in Europe, she married Denis O'Sullivan on 4 May 1893 in London. She then returned to San Francisco after her year abroad and exhibited her work at her old studio space in the Art Student's League. She exhibited her oil paintings at the California Midwinter International Exposition of 1894 and her work in 1898 at the Mark Hopkins Institute of Art in San Francisco.

For part of the 1890s, she lived in Holland and painted local subjects, including Dutch children. She returned to San Francisco by 1895, bringing back the artwork she made while abroad.

=== Later career and life ===
During her life, she lived between California and Europe. Eventually her and her husband moved to England, mainly living in London after their marriage. Together they had a daughter, Bridgid O'Sullivan, and two sons, Terence O'Sullivan and Curtis O'Sullivan. Her husband became a well-known opera singer, and she became a stage manager, her husband's business manager, and a playwright. She wrote under the pseudonym Patrick Bidwell, including for the 1904 musical, Peggy Machree. Its music was arranged by Michele Esposito, and the play successfully toured Britain—including London—and the British Isles. The tour ended when O'Sullivan's husband died in 1908, but the musical later continued on to a Broadway production.

Once World War I started, O'Sullivan turned towards relief efforts while she lived in London. Fluent in Flemish, she began to work as a Flemish interpreter after the Siege of Antwerp. Her home became a refuge and makeshift hospital as part of her work during the war. She collaborated with her previous colleague from the Art Student's League, Julia Heynemann, for the war relief efforts. While O'Sullivan worked in London, Heynemann established "California House", a parallel relief organization in California.

O'Sullivan traveled back to San Francisco around late 1916 or early 1917. She lived in the city for at least a two years while her daughter attended school. While in California, she organized hospitality services and events for military members. She was active in the Serbian war relief efforts and helped organize an art exhibit as part of the local Serbian Relief Committee.

O'Sullivan continued to write, both books and for the theater. She was the editor and compiler of Harry Butters, R. F. A., Life and Letters, a war book based on letters from the life of a British army officer. She wrote the 1920 books, Mr. Dimmock (1920), which covered Serbia after the war as part of its plot, and Double Dealing. She began writing the libretto for an opera in 1923, with composer Harold Samuel.

By 1924, O'Sullivan planned to move out of the United States permanently. In 1939, she exhibited at the Golden Gate International Exposition.

She died due to an accident on 16 June 1951, at the age of 85.

== Works ==
=== Literature ===
- Harry Butters, R. F. A., Life and Letters (c. 1917)
- Mr. Dimmock (1920)
- Double Dealing (1920)

=== Theatre ===
- Peggy Machree (1904), romantic comedy musical, music arrangements by Michele Esposito
- Prince, Pretender, or Borrowdene (1907), comic opera, music by Evelyn Baker
