= Walker Whiting Vick =

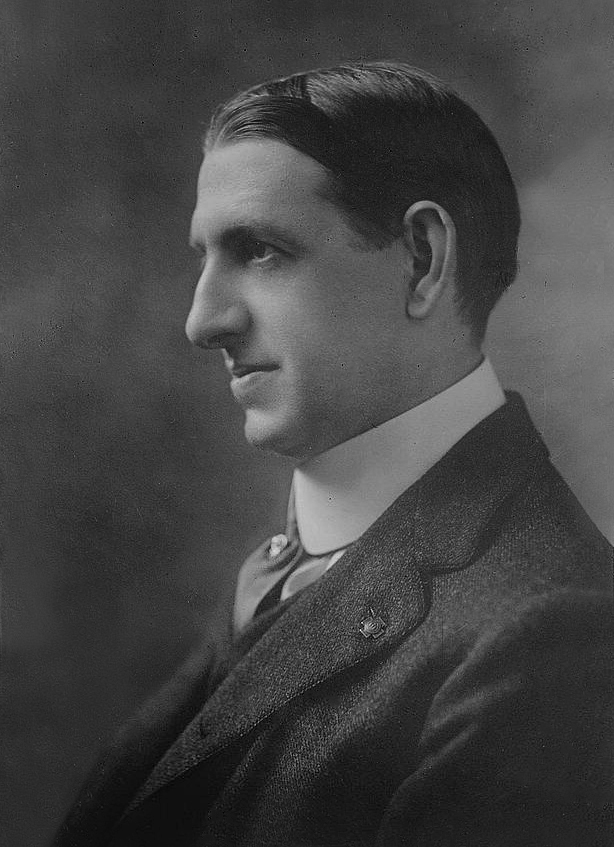
Walker Whiting Vick circa 1913

Walker Whiting Vick (August 16, 1878 - May 12, 1926) was an aide to Woodrow Wilson in 1912, an officer of the Democratic National Committee, Receiver General of Customs in the Dominican Republic while it was a US protectorate and a resident of Rutherford, New Jersey.
