= Film Company of Ireland =

- Type: Production company
- Industry: Film
- Headquarters: Dublin, Ireland

The Film Company of Ireland was the first film production company established in Ireland. It operated from 1916 to 1922.

== History ==
The Film Company of Ireland (FCOI) was founded in March 1916 by Ellen O'Mara Sullivan, James Mark Sullivan, and Henry Fitzgibbon, the first such company to be established in Ireland. The company was very active from 1916 to 1917. Nine of the films were produced by J. M. Kerrigan, who also acted in a number of them. Through Kerrigan, a number of Abbey Theatre actors featured in the FCOI's productions, including Fred O'Donovan, Kathleen Murphy, Nora Clancy, Brian Magowan, J. M. Carre, Irene Murphy, and Valentine Roberts. O'Donovan was also an actor-director in a number of 1917 FCOI productions.

During the Easter Rising in 1916, the FCOI's offices on Sackville Street were destroyed, along with a large amount of the company's early material. The company moved to 34 Dame Street. They filmed a large number of their films in County Kerry. Sullivan attempted to sell the FCOI films in the United States from 1918, incorporating in Boston. A number of their films were screened at various locations there. After the death of his wife and son, Sullivan sold off the FCOI to A.V. Feary. The company struggled to secure funding throughout 1921, with correspondence from the company stopping in 1922.

== Productions ==
- O'Neil of the Glen (1916)
- The Miser's Gift (1916)
- Woman's Wit (1916)
- Food of Love (1916)
- An Unfair Love Affair (1916)
- When Love Came to Gavin Burke
- Knocknagow (1918)
- Rafferty's Rise (1918)
- Willy Reilly and His Colleen Bawn (1920)
