= Queen's County Ossory =

Former parliamentary constituency in the United Kingdom

- Former county constituency for the House of Commons

1885–1918
- Seats: 1
- Created from: Queen's County
- Replaced by: Queen's County

Ossory, a division of Queen's County, was a constituency in Ireland, returning one Member of Parliament to the United Kingdom House of Commons from 1885 to 1918.

== Boundaries ==
Prior to the 1885 general election and after the dissolution of Parliament in 1918 the area was part of the Queen's County constituency.

This constituency comprised the western part of Queen's County (renamed as County Laois in 1920).

The Redistribution of Seats Act 1885 defined the division as including the baronies of Clandonagh, Clarmallagh, Maryborough West, Tinnahinch, and Upper Woods, and that part of the barony of Portnahinch contained within the parish of Ardea.

== Members of Parliament ==
Election	MP	Party	Notes
1885	Arthur O'Connor	Irish Parliamentary	
1886 b	Stephen O'Mara	Irish Parliamentary	O'Connor sits for East Donegal
1886	William Archibald Macdonald	Irish Parliamentary	
1892	Eugene Crean	Irish National Federation	
1895	Eugene Crean	Irish National Federation	
1900	William Delany	Irish Parliamentary	
1906	William Delany	Irish Parliamentary	
Jan. 1910	William Delany	Irish Parliamentary	
Dec. 1910	William Delany	Irish Parliamentary	
1916 b	John Lalor Fitzpatrick	Irish Parliamentary	Death of Delany
1918	Constituency merged into Queen's County		

== Elections ==
=== Elections in the 1880s ===
1885 general election: Ossory
Party	Candidate	Votes	%	±%
Irish Parliamentary	Arthur O'Connor	3,959	93.1	
Irish Conservative	Richard Caldbeck	293	6.9	
Majority		3,666	86.2	
Turnout		4,252	75.7	
Registered electors		5,617		
Irish Parliamentary win (new seat)				

O'Connor is also elected MP for East Donegal and opts to sit there, causing a by-election.

By-election, 1886: Ossory
Party	Candidate	Votes	%	±%
Irish Parliamentary	Stephen O'Mara	Unopposed		
Registered electors		5,617		
Irish Parliamentary hold				

1886 general election: Ossory
Party	Candidate	Votes	%	±%
Irish Parliamentary	William Archibald Macdonald	Unopposed		
Registered electors		5,617		
Irish Parliamentary hold				

=== Elections in the 1890s ===
1892 general election: Ossory
Party	Candidate	Votes	%	±%
Irish National Federation	Eugene Crean	3,666	87.5	N/A
Irish Unionist	Robert Staples	523	12.5	New
Majority		3,143	75.0	N/A
Turnout		4,189	59.8	N/A
Registered electors		7,007		
Irish National Federation gain from Irish Parliamentary		Swing	N/A	

1895 general election: Ossory
Party	Candidate	Votes	%	±%
Irish National Federation	Eugene Crean	2,986	74.7	−12.8
Irish Unionist	William Hutcheson Poë	630	15.8	+3.3
Ind. Nationalist	William Archibald Macdonald	383	9.6	New
Majority		2,356	58.9	−16.1
Turnout		3,999	74.0	+14.2
Registered electors		5,401		
Irish National Federation hold		Swing	−8.1	

=== Elections in the 1900s ===
1900 general election: Ossory
Party	Candidate	Votes	%	±%
Irish Parliamentary	William Delany	Unopposed		
Registered electors		6,521		
Irish Parliamentary hold				

1906 general election: Ossory
Party	Candidate	Votes	%	±%
Irish Parliamentary	William Delany	Unopposed		
Registered electors		4,824		
Irish Parliamentary hold				

=== Elections in the 1910s ===
January 1910 general election: Ossory
Party	Candidate	Votes	%	±%
Irish Parliamentary	William Delany	Unopposed		
Registered electors		4,786		
Irish Parliamentary hold				

December 1910 general election: Ossory
Party	Candidate	Votes	%	±%
Irish Parliamentary	William Delany	Unopposed		
Registered electors		4,786		
Irish Parliamentary hold				

Delany's death causes a by-election.

By-election, 1916: Ossory
Party	Candidate	Votes	%	±%
Irish Parliamentary	John Lalor Fitzpatrick	2,003	55.3	N/A
Ind. Nationalist	James J. Aird	1,616	44.7	New
Majority		387	10.6	N/A
Turnout		3,619	74.7	N/A
Registered electors		4,842		
Irish Parliamentary hold		Swing	N/A	
