= Arthur O'Connor (politician, born 1844) =

Arthur O'Connor (1 October 1844 – 30 March 1923), was an Irish politician and Member of Parliament (MP) in the Parliament of the United Kingdom of Great Britain and Ireland from 1880 to 1900.

He was elected to the House of Commons as MP. for Queen's County at the 1880 general election, until the constituency was divided at the 1885 general election.

He then contested both the new Queen's County Ossory seat and East Donegal for the Irish Parliamentary Party in 1885 and was elected for both. He chose to sit for East Donegal.

He was elected as an Anti-Parnellite MP in the 1892 general election, holding that seat through the 1895 general election for Donegal East until the 1900 general election when as a QC., he was defeated standing as an Healyite Nationalist for Donegal North.

== Notes ==
Parliament of the United Kingdom
Preceded by Kenelm Thomas Digby; Edmund Dease	Member of Parliament for Queen's County; 1880 – 1885; Served alongside: Richard Lalor	Constituency divided
New constituency	Member of Parliament for Queen's County Ossory; 1885	Succeeded by Stephen O'Mara
New constituency	Member of Parliament for East Donegal; 1885 – 1900	Succeeded by Edward McFadden
