= Teresa Lalor =

Irish-American nun

Teresa Lalor, V.H.M. (born ca. 1769, County Laois, Ireland; d. 9 September 1846, Washington, D.C.) was an Irish immigrant to the United States, and a nun, co-foundress, with the Most Rev. Leonard Neale, S.J., the second Archbishop of Baltimore, of the Visitation Order's first monastery in the United States.

== Early life ==
Christened Alice, she was born in County Laois, Ireland, the daughter of Denis and Catherine Lalor, but moved with her family to County Kilkenny as a child. Her childhood was spent in Ireland with her sisters. At her request, John Lanigan, the Roman Catholic Bishop of Ossory, made arrangements for her entrance into a convent of his diocese, which her family opposed. She however, instead agreed to accompany her sister, Mrs. Doran and her husband, an American merchant to America, during the winter of 1794. They arrived in America on 5 January 1795.

Moving to Philadelphia in 1797, she became acquainted with Fr. Neale, then the pastor of St. Joseph's Church in that city, and under his direction she devoted herself to works of piety and charity with a small group of associates. The group went on to open an academy for the instruction of girls.

== Georgetown ==
Fr. Neale was transferred in 1799 from Philadelphia, to become President of Georgetown College; she and her associates, the widows Mrs. McDermot and Mrs. Sharpe, also went to Georgetown, and were for a time domiciled with a small community of Poor Clares, exiled from France. Neale purchased a house for Lalor and two companions to open a school of their own, a house which stood within the grounds of the later Georgetown Visitation Monastery, the oldest monastery of the Order in the U.S.

The group increased from three to five members. At this time, enclosure was only partially observed. They did their own shopping and marketing, went to church, and accompanied their students on daily walks. Sister Ignatia Sharpe died in the summer of 1802, after a long illness. In 1804 the Poor Clares were able to return to France, and Mother Lalor bought the house and land. They made corn bread from corn they raised, husked, and shelled before sending to the mill. a creek which emptied into the Potomac crossed the property. The sisters cleaned, salted and put up their own fish. They had a fine vegetable garden. They also saved the parings and cores of apples, and by boiling these made a sweet drink to vary the meager fare.

The "pious ladies", as they were called, aspired to become Religious Sisters; Bishop Neale wished to affiliate them with the Visitation Order. The disturbed condition of affairs in Europe, due to the Napoleonic Wars, prevented this until 1816, when he obtained a grant from Pope Pius VII for the community to be considered as belonging to the Order of the Visitation. Mother Teresa and the two other Sisters were professed on the Feast of the Holy Innocents (28 December) of that same year, and became the first mother superior of the Georgetown monastery. She lived to see three other houses of the Institute founded, offshoots of the mother community: Mobile, Alabama in 1832; Kaskaskia (afterwards transferred to St. Louis), in 1833; and Baltimore, in 1837.

== Death ==
She died in 1846, aged around 77 years. Her remains, with those of Archbishop Neale, are interred in the crypt beneath the chapel of the monastery which they founded. She was a first cousin of Patrick "Patt" Lalor (1781-1856) (elected in 1832 as the first Catholic Member of Parliament for County Laois in two centuries) and of Joseph O'Lawlor (1768-1850), the Irish-born Spanish general and military governor of Granada.
