= Richard Lalor =

Richard Lalor (1823 – 13 November 1893) was an Irish Nationalist Member of the Parliament of the United Kingdom for Queen's County, 1880–85 and for Queen's County (Leix), 1885–92.

He was the son of Patrick "Patt" Lalor of Tenakill, Mountrath, Queen's County, who had himself been an M.P. for Queen's County in 1832–35. His eldest brother was James Fintan Lalor and his younger brother was the Australian politician Peter Lalor. His mother was Anna, daughter of Patrick Dillon of Sheane. He was educated privately and became a civil engineer and tenant farmer. Like his brother James Fintan, he was a Young Irelander. In 1852 he married Margaret, daughter of Michael Dunne of Mountrath. He became a magistrate for Queen's County.

He headed the poll as a Parnellite Home Ruler in the election for the two Queen's County seats in 1880, ousting the former Home Rule member, Kenelm Digby. He then won the new Queen's County (Leix) seat in 1885, defeating his Conservative opponent by more than 7 to 1. He won again in 1886, by an even bigger margin.

T. P. O'Connor described him in 1886: "Today he is a feeble and bent man with wearied eyes and a thin voice, but his spirit is exactly the same as in his hot youth. In 1848 he had his pike and his thousands of pikemen ready for action; today, as then, he is the unconquerable and irreclaimable rebel – the Blanqui of Irish politics."

When the Irish Parliamentary Party split in December 1890 over the leadership of Charles Stewart Parnell, Lalor supported Parnell. However failing health prevented him from campaigning in the general election of 1892, and he was ousted from his seat.

He died at his home at Tenakill, Queen's County, on Monday 13 November 1893. His grandson John Lalor Fitzpatrick (1875–1956) was also a nationalist member of the House of Commons for the Ossory division of Queen's County (1916–18).

== Notes ==
Parliament of the United Kingdom
Preceded by Kenelm Thomas Digby; Edmund Dease	Member of Parliament for Queen's County; 1880 – 1885; With: Arthur O'Connor	Constituency divided
New constituency	Member of Parliament for Queen's County Leix; 1885 – 1892	Succeeded by Mark MacDonnell
