= Ellen Sullivan =

Ellen O'Mara Sullivan
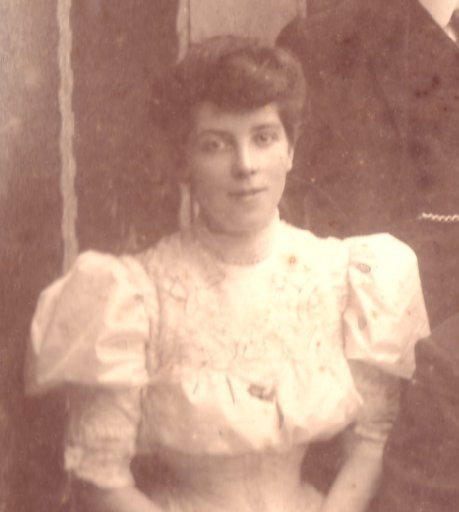
- Born: Ellen O'Mara; 6 June 1882
- Died: 17 May 1919 (aged 36)
- Known for: directing Film Company of Ireland
- Spouse: James Mark Sullivan

Ellen (Nell) O'Mara Sullivan (6 June 1882 – 17 May 1919) was an Irish silent film screenwriter and film company director. The company her family funded and ran was said to be the most prolific Irish silent film company.

== Life ==
She was born into the large family of Stephen O'Mara who was the Mayor of Limerick and an Irish nationalist. Her family were nationalists and her father had resigned as a Member of Parliament in 1907 in order to support Sinn Féin.

In 1910 she married James Mark Sullivan who was an Irish-born American coming back to Ireland to sort out family bequests.

Using her family's money they started the Film Company of Ireland which created dozens of silent films.

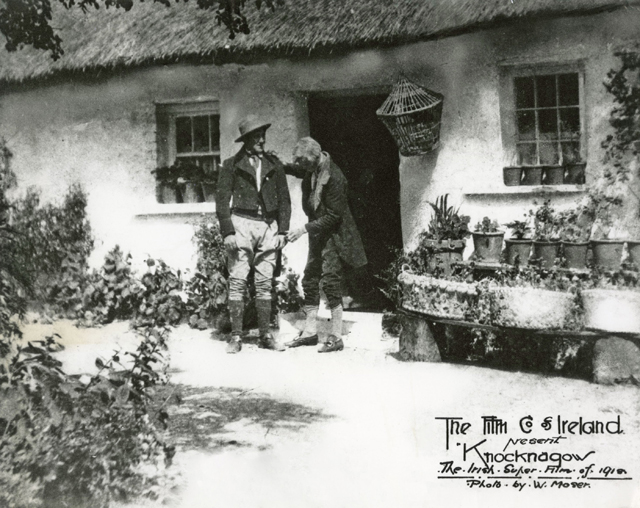
The silent film "Knocknagow" aka "The Homes of Tipperary"

The business was registered in March 1916, by her husband, they and Henry M. Fitzgibbon. During the Easter Rising in 1916, the FCOI's Sackville Street offices in Dublin were destroyed and the company moved to 34 Dame Street.

By 1917 she had written a screenplay and the company was filming an ambitious film based on the book Knocknagow by Charles Kickham. The film supported her family's nationalist aspirations. Knocknagow was not completed until the following year and is one of the two works of the company which are still extant. However they made many more and their film company is said to be the "most prolific indigenous film company" throughout the whole of the silent film era.

In 1919 her son caught typhoid fever and Sullivan caught the disease and died. The film company ended the following year once the three films in production had been completed.
