= Law (surname) =

Law is a surname, of English, Scottish, Cantonese, or Chinese origin. In Scotland, the surname means dweller at the low, as in a hill. Another origin of the surname is a contraction of Lawrence, or Lawson.

== Notable people with the surname Law ==
Notable people with the surname Law include:

- Acie Law (born 1985), American basketball player
- Alex Law (1952–2022), Hong Kong film director, screen writer, and producer
- Alexander Law (1832–1895), English cricketer
- Alfred Law (1860–1939), English politician
- Alfred Law (cricketer) (1862–1919), English cricketer
- Alice Law (1870–1942), New Zealand music teacher for the visually impaired
- Alvin Law (born 1960), Canadian motivational speaker
- Andrew Law (disambiguation), multiple people
- Annie Law (1842–1889), British-American conchologist
- Arthur Law (disambiguation), multiple people
- Benjamin Law (disambiguation), multiple people
- Bernard Francis Law (1931–2017), former Archbishop of Boston
- Bonar Law (1858–1923), British prime minister
- Brian Law (born 1970), Welsh footballer
- Bryn Law (born 1969), Welsh football commentator
- Calab Law (born 2003), Australian athlete
- Catherine Law, British medical researcher
- Chris Law (born 1969), Scottish politician
- Chris Law (sailor) (1952–2007), British sailor who won the Finn Gold Cup in 1976
- Clara Law (born 1957), Hong Kong film director
- Cody Law (born 1995), American collegiate wrestler and MMA fighter
- Delia Constance Law (1870–1938), Australian philanthropist
- Denis Law (1940–2025), Scottish footballer
- Dennis Law (disambiguation), multiple people
- Derek Law (born 1990), American baseball pitcher
- Don Law (1902–1982), English-born country music record producer and executive
- Edward Law, 1st Baron Ellenborough (1750–1818), English judge and politician
- Evander M. Law (1836–1920), general in the Confederate States Army
- John Law (disambiguation), multiple people
- Josh Law (born 1989), English footballer
- Jude Law (born 1972), English actor
- Keith Law (writer) (born 1973), American writer
- Kendrick Law (born 2003), American football player
- Kenneth Law (born 1965), Canadian criminal
- Mark Law (engineer), American engineer
- Michelle Law, Australian writer and screenwriter
- Nel Law (1914–1990), Australian writer and Antarctic traveller
- Nicholas Law (born 1990), American engineer & inventor
- Nicky Law, multiple people
- Oliver Law (1900–1937), American communist
- Peter Law (1948–2006), Welsh politician
- Phyllida Law (1932–2026), Scottish actress
- Randy Law, American politician
- Richard Law (disambiguation), multiple people
- Rick Law (born 1969), American illustrator
- Rita Law, Maltese politician
- Robert D. Law (1944–1969), United States Medal of Honor recipient
- Robin Law (born 1944), British Africanist and historian
- Rudy Law (born 1956), American baseball player
- Ruth Law Oliver (1887–1970), American aviator
- Ryan Law (born 1999), English footballer
- Sadie Frost (born 1965), formerly known as Sadie Law, English actress, director, producer, and fashion designer
- Sarah Law (born 1994), Scottish rugby player
- Satya Churn Law (1888–1984), Indian educationist
- Sian Law (born 1981), wrestler from New Zealand
- Thelma Patten Law (1900–1968), African American physician
- Thomas Law (disambiguation), multiple people
- Tony Law (born 1969), Canadian comedian
- Trish Law (born 1954), British politician
- Ty Law (born 1974), American football cornerback
- Vance Law (born 1956), American baseball player and coach
- Vern Law (born 1930), American baseball pitcher
- Wendy Law (1960–2026), British crossword compiler and librarian
- William Law (disambiguation), multiple people

== Notable people with the surname Law (羅) ==
Persons with the surname "Law" (羅) include:

- Law Kar Po (born 1947/1948), Chinese executive
- Nathan Law Kwun Chung (born 1993), Hong Kong fugitive and former member of the Hong Kong Legislative Council

== See also ==
=== General ===
- Law
- Law (disambiguation)

=== Surnames ===
- Lah (surname)
- Lau (surname)
- Lawler (surname)
- Lawless (surname)
- Lawlor
- Laws (surname)
- Lawton (surname)
- Lawyer (surname)
- Low (surname)
- Lowe (surname)
- Luo (surname), Chinese surname commonly transliterated as "Law"
