= Lawler (surname) =

Lawler is an Irish surname. It is an Anglicized form of Gaelic Ó Leathlobhair. Notable people with the surname include:

- Anderson Lawler (1902–1959), American actor
- Brian Lawler (1972–2018), American wrestler known as Brian Christopher
- Chris Lawler (born 1943), British footballer
- Daisy Lawler (born 1942), American politician from Oklahoma
- Edward E. Lawler (born 1938), American academic
- Eva Lawler (born 1962), Australian politician
- Fergal Lawler, Irish drummer
- Frank Lawler (1842–1896), American politician
- Geoffrey Lawler (born 1954), British politician
- George Lawler (born 1995), English rugby league footballer
- Greg Lawler (born 1955), American mathematician
- James F. Lawler (born 1935), American politician from South Dakota
- Jerry Lawler (born 1949), American wrestler and color commentator
- John Jeremiah Lawler (1862–1948), American bishop
- John Paul Lawler (born 1979), real name of Scottish musician Jon Fratelli
- Justin Lawler (born 1994), American football player
- Kate Lawler (born 1980), English model and DJ
- Kenny Lawler (born 1994), American football player
- Lillian B. Lawler (1898–1990), American philologist
- Louise Lawler (born 1947), American artist
- Matt Lawler (born 1991), English Guitar player
- Matilda Lawler (born 2008), American actress
- Michael K. Lawler (1814–1882), Irish-American army general
- Mike Lawler (born 1986), American congressman from New York
- Peter Lawler (disambiguation), numerous people
- Ralph Lawler (born 1938), American television and radio personality
- Ray Lawler (1921–2024), Australian playwright and actor
- Robbie Lawler (born 1982), American mixed martial artist
- Rod Lawler (born 1971), English snooker player
- Sean Lawler, Chief of Protocol of the United States
- Steve Lawler (DJ) (born 1973), British electronic musician
- Steve Lawler (wrestler) (1965–2021), American professional wrestler
- Sylvia Lawler (1922–1996), English geneticist
- Tony Lawler (born 1961), Australian politician
- Traugott Lawler (born 1937), American historian

== See also ==
- Jordan Lawlar (born 2002), American baseball player
- Ernest Lawlars (1900–1961), American blues musician known as Little Son Joe
- Lawyer (surname)
