= Cinesias =

Cinesias may refer to:

- Cinesias (character)
- Cinesias (poet)
