= Compass (Australian TV program) =

Australian documentary TV series

- Also known as: ABC Compass
- Genre: Television documentary
- Created by: ABC Religion and Ethics
- Presented by: Indira Naidoo; Geraldine Doogue; Benjamin Law
- Country of origin: Australia
- Original language: English
- No. of seasons: 40

Production
- Executive producer: Amanda Collinge
- Producers: Kim Akhurst; Tracey Spring; Anna Klauzner; Louise Heywood; Suzanne Smith
- Editors: Danielle Akayan; Peter O'Donoghue; Philippa Byers; Anna Craney
- Running time: 30 minutes
- Production company: Australian Broadcasting Corporation

Original release
- Network: ABC Television
- Release: 7 February 1988 – present

Compass is an Australian weekly news-documentary program exploring faith, values, ethics, and religion from around the world.

It broadcasts on ABC TV every Sunday at 6:30 pm, with a repeat broadcast on Wednesdays at 1:30 pm, and is available on demand via ABC iview.

== History ==
In February 2017, after nearly 20 years as host, Geraldine Doogue stepped down, with Kumi Taguchi taking over.

Taguchi departed in late 2020, and Doogue returned to host the program from 2021 to 2022.

In 2023, the ABC announced Indira Naidoo as the new host.

== See also ==
- List of programs broadcast by ABC (Australian TV network)
- List of Australian television series
- List of longest-running Australian television series
