= List of Classical Greek phrases =

This article lists direct English translations of common Classical Greek phrases.

== Αα ==
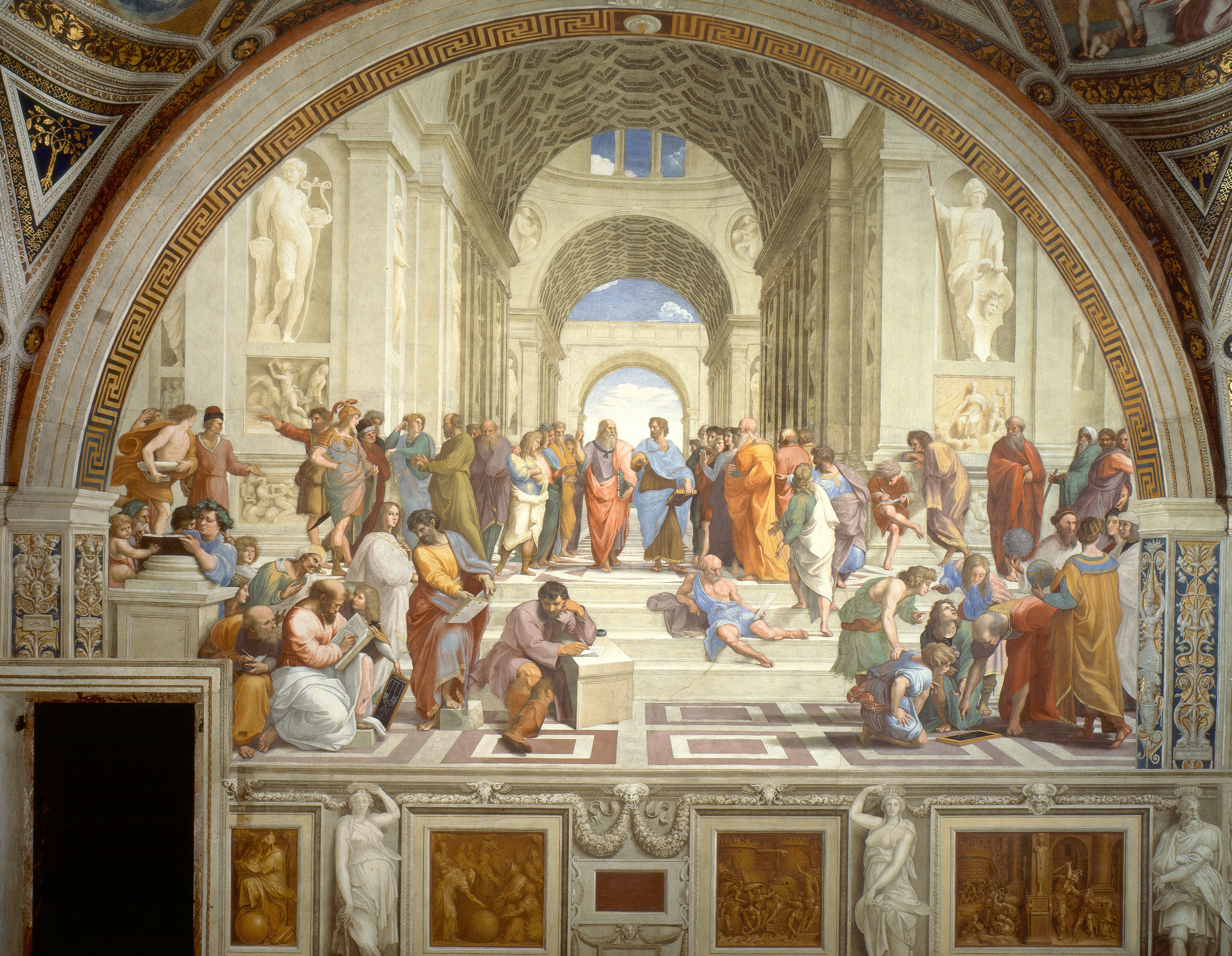
The School of Athens. Fresco by Raphael (1510–1511)

Ἀγεωμέτρητος μηδεὶς εἰσίτω.
Ageōmétrētos mēdeìs eisítō.
"Let no one untrained in geometry enter."
Motto over the entrance to Plato's Academy (quoted in Elias' commentary on Aristotle's Categories: Eliae in Porphyrii Isagogen et Aristotelis categorias commentaria, CAG XVIII.1, Berlin 1900, p. 118.13–19).

Ἀεὶ Λιβύη φέρει τι καινόν.
Aeì Libúē phérei ti kainón.
"Libya always bears something new", Aristotle, History of Animals.
Compare the Latin proverb ex Africa semper aliquid novi 'from Africa always something new', based on Pliny the Elder.

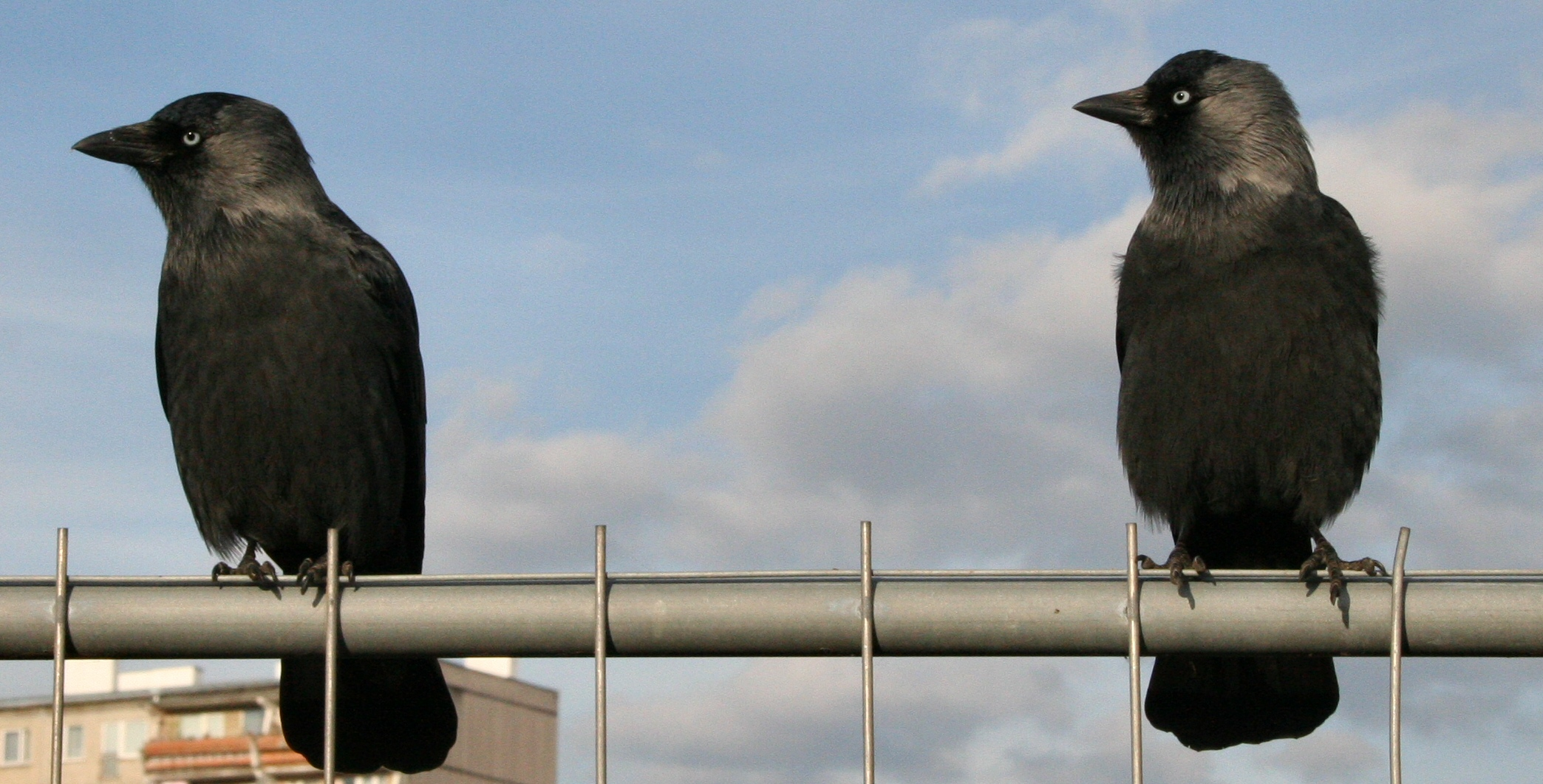
Ἀεὶ κολοιὸς παρὰ κολοιῷ ἱζάνει "A jackdaw is always found near a jackdaw"

Ἀεὶ κολοιὸς παρὰ κολοιῷ ἱζάνει.
Aeì koloiòs parà koloiôi hizánei.
"A jackdaw is always found near a jackdaw"
Similar to English "birds of a feather flock together."

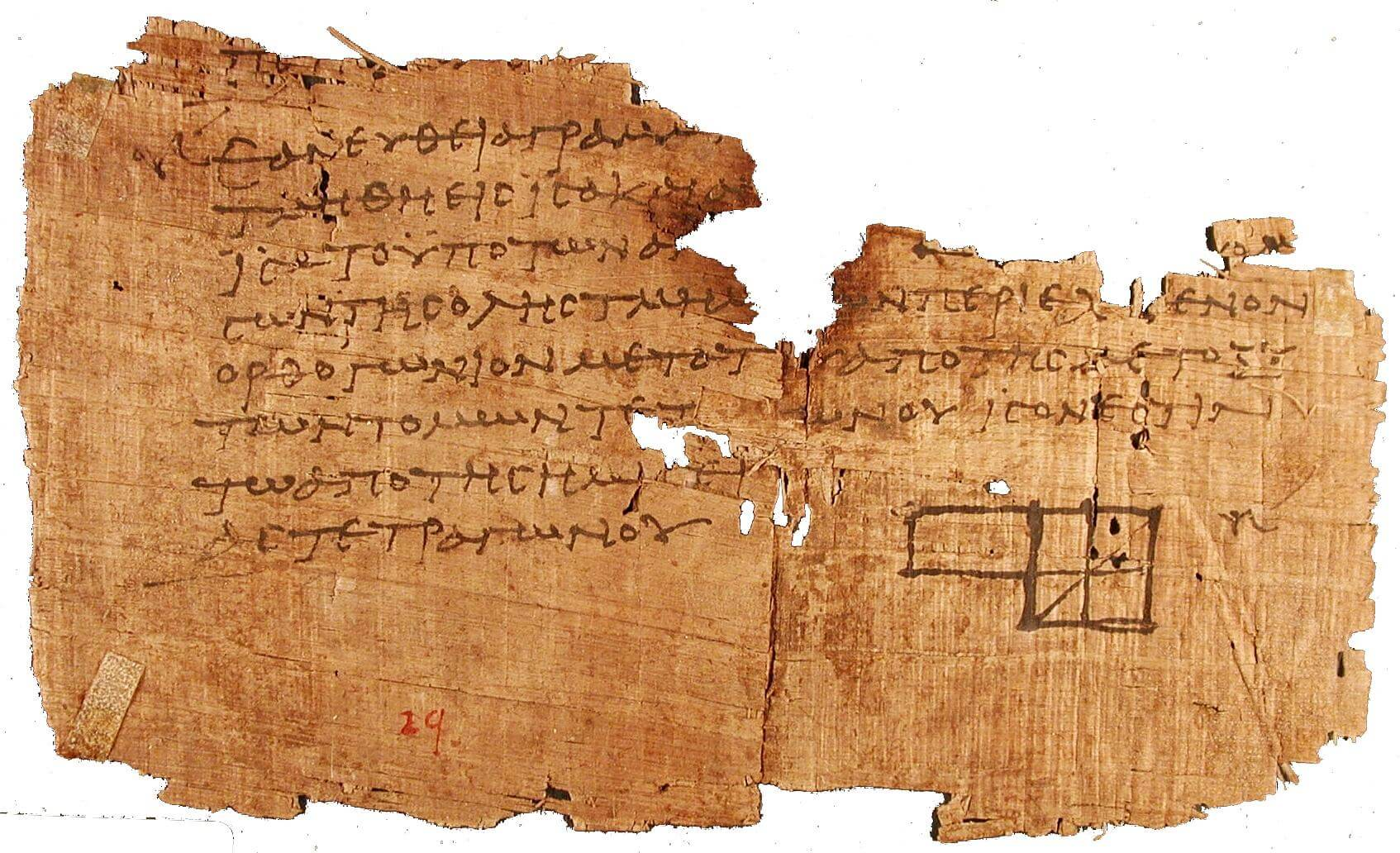
Papyrus, dated 75–125 A.D. describing one of the oldest diagrams of Euclid's Elements

Ἀεὶ ὁ θεὸς γεωμετρεῖ.
Aeì ho theòs geōmetreî.
"God always geometrizes." — Plato
Plutarch elaborated on this phrase in his essay Πῶς Πλάτων ἔλεγε τὸν θεὸν ἀεί γεωμετρεῖν "What is Plato's meaning when he says that God always applies geometry". Based on the phrase of Plato, above, a present-day mnemonic for π (pi) was derived:

Ἀεὶ ὁ θεὸς ὁ μέγας γεωμετρεῖ τὸ σύμπαν.

Aeì ho theòs ho mégas geōmetreî tò súmpan.
Always the great God applies geometry to the universe.

π = 3.1415926...
ἀεὶ	ὁ	θεὸς	ὁ	μέγας	γεωμετρεῖ	τὸ	σύμπαν
3 letters	1 letter	4 letters	1 letter	5 letters	9 letters	2 letters	6 letters

Ἀετοῦ γῆρας, κορυδοῦ νεότης.
Aetoû gêras, korydoû neótēs.
"An eagle's old age (is worth) a sparrow's youth."

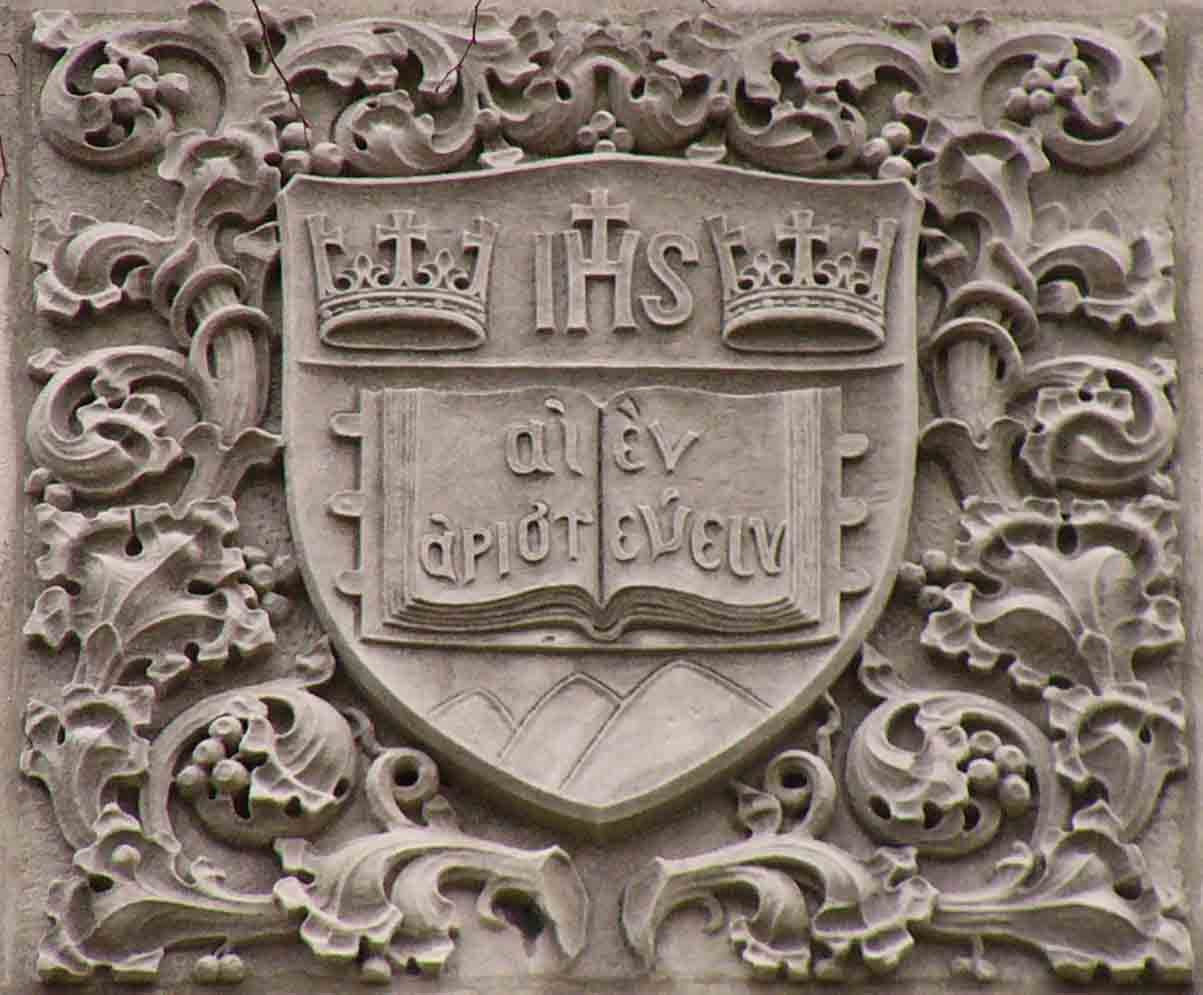
Aἰὲν ἀριστεύειν motto, Depicted on engraving at the Boston College

αἰὲν ἀριστεύειν
aièn aristeúein
"Ever to Excel"
Motto of the University of St Andrews (founded 1410), the Edinburgh Academy (founded 1824), and Boston College (founded 1863). The source is the sixth book of Homer's Iliad, (Iliad 6. 208) in a speech Glaucus delivers to Diomedes:
"Hippolocus begat me. I claim to be his son, and he sent me to Troy with strict instructions: Ever to excel, to do better than others, and to bring glory to your forebears, who indeed were very great ... This is my ancestry; this is the blood I am proud to inherit."

Αἴκα.
Aíka.
"If."
Plutarch reports that Philip II of Macedon sent word to the Spartans, saying that "if I should invade Laconia, I shall drive you out" (ἂν ἐμβάλω εἰς τὴν Λακωνικήν, ἀναστάτους ὑμᾶς ποιήσω). The Spartans laconically responded with "if."

Ἀνάγκᾳ δ’ οὐδὲ θεοὶ μάχονται.
Anánkāi d' oudè theoì mákhontai.
"Not even the gods fight against necessity." — Simonides, 8, 20.

Ἀλλὰ τὶ ἦ μοι ταῦτα περὶ δρῦν ἢ περὶ πέτρην;
Allà tì êi moi taûta perì drûn ḕ perì pétrēn?
"But why all this about oak or stone?"
English : Why waste time on trivial subjects, or "Why make a mountain out of a mole hill?"
Hesiod, Theogony, 35.

Ἀνδρῶν γὰρ ἐπιφανῶν πᾶσα γῆ τάφος.
Andrôn gàr epiphanôn pâsa gê táphos.
For illustrious men have the whole earth for their tomb. Pericles' Funeral Oration from Thucydides, History of the Peloponnesian War 2.43.3

Ἀνεῤῥίφθω κύβος.
Anerrhíphthō kúbos.
Alea iacta est.
Latin: "The die has been cast"; Greek: "Let the die be cast."
Julius Caesar as reported by Plutarch, when he entered Italy with his army in 49 BC. Translated into Latin by Suetonius as alea iacta est.

Ἄνθρωπος μέτρον.
Ánthrōpos métron.
"Man [is] the measure [of all things]"
Motto of Protagoras (as quoted in Plato's Theaetetus 152a).

ἅπαξ λεγόμενον
hápax legómenon
"Once said"
A word that only occurs once.

ἀπὸ μηχανῆς Θεός
apò mēkhanês Theós
Deus ex machina
"God from the machine"
The phrase originates from the way deity figures appeared in ancient Greek theaters, held high up by a machine, to solve a problem in the plot.

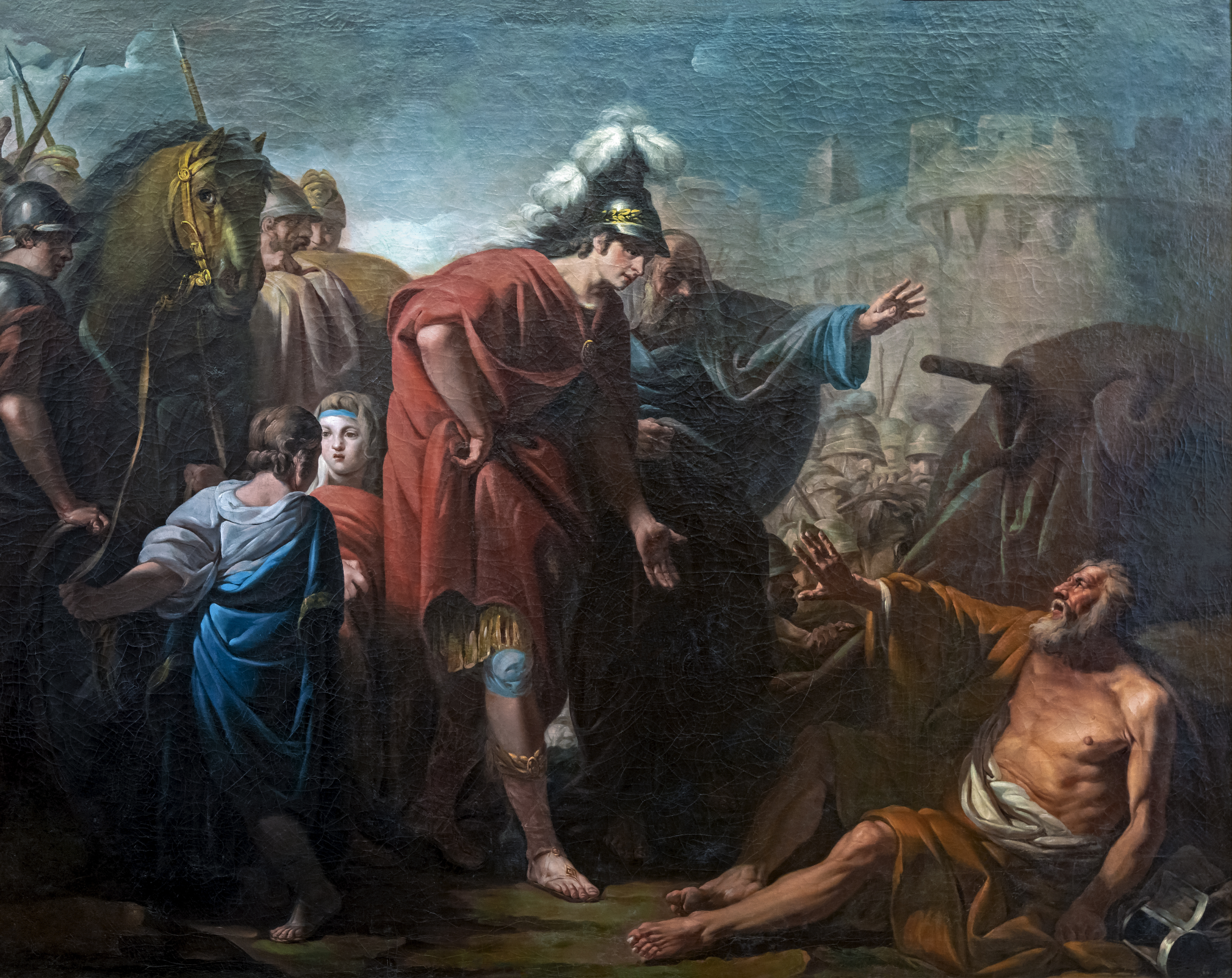
"Ἀπὸ τοῦ ἡλίου μετάστηθι" — Diogenes the Cynic — in a 1763 painting by Jacques Gamelin

Ἀπὸ τοῦ ἡλίου μετάστηθι.
Apò toû hēlíou metástēthi.
"Stand a little out of my sun."
Legendary reply of Diogenes the Cynic when Alexander the Great asked him if he had any wish he desired to fulfil — version recounted by Plutarch

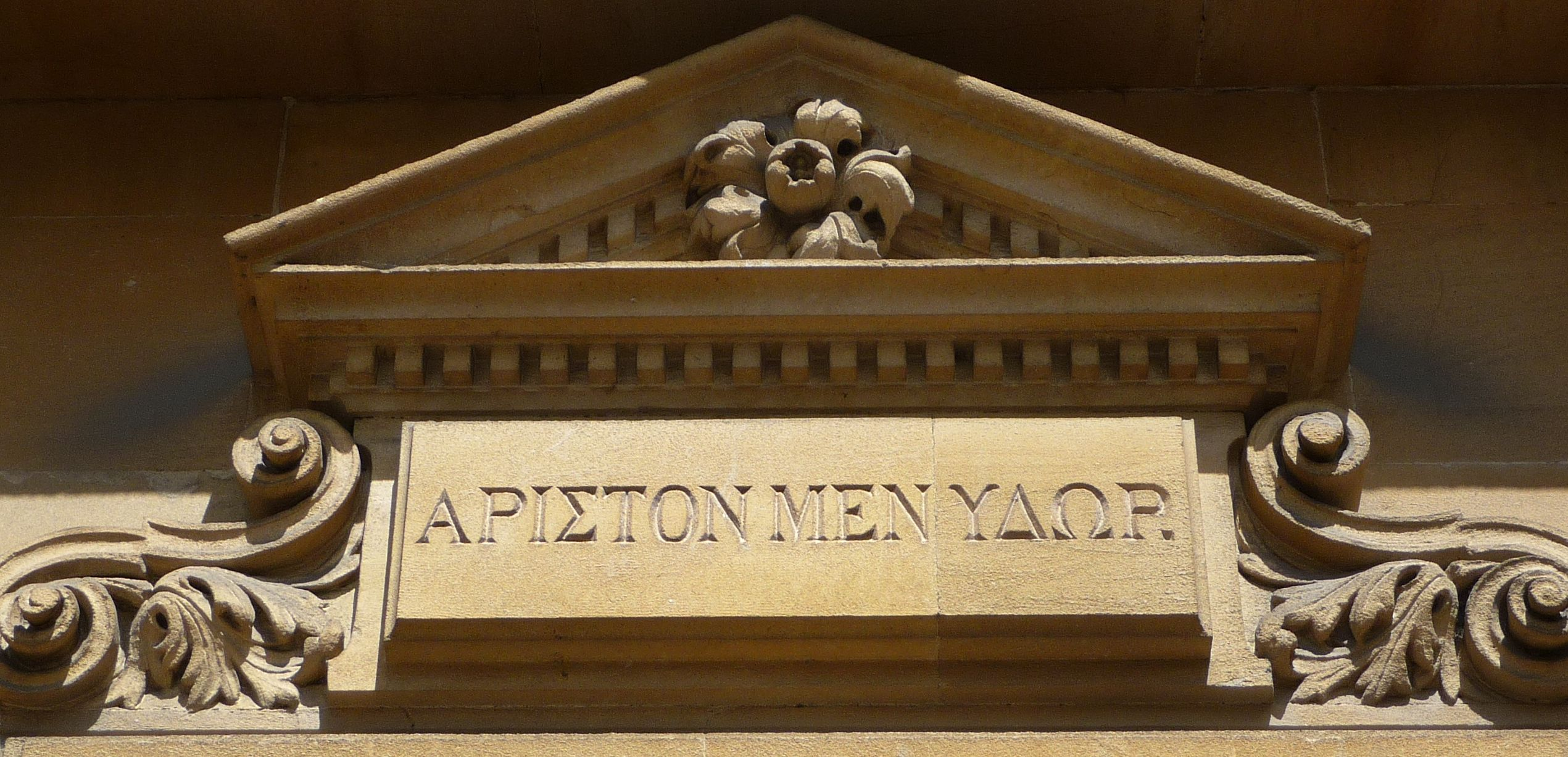
ἄριστον μὲν ὕδωρ; Pump Room at Bath

Ἄριστον μὲν ὕδωρ.
áriston mèn húdōr.
"Greatest however [is] water" — Pindar, Olymp. 1, 1
Used as the inscription over the Pump Room at Bath.

αὐτὸς ἔφα
autòs épha
Ipse dixit
"He himself said it"
Argument from authority made by the disciples of Pythagoras when appealing to the pronouncements of the master rather than to reason or evidence. The Latin translation of the phrase comes from Marcus Tullius Cicero in De Natura Deorum (On the Nature of the Gods)

== Ββ ==
βασιλεία τῶν οὐρανῶν
basileía tôn ouranôn
"kingdom of the heavens"
"Heaven" is a foundational theological concept in Christianity and Judaism.
"God's Kingdom" (Βασιλεία τοῦ Θεοῦ, Basileia tou Theou), or the "Kingdom of [the] Heaven[s]" was the main point of Jesus Christ's preaching on earth. The phrase occurs more than a hundred times in the New Testament.

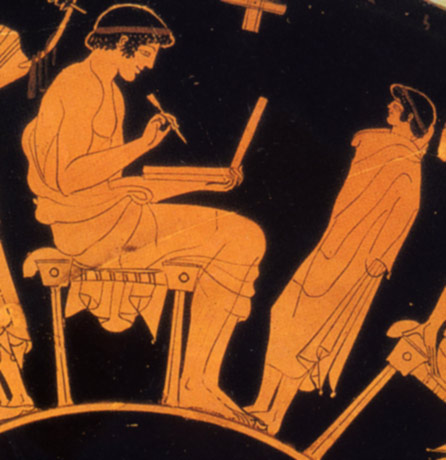
From a ca 500 BC vase depicting writing with stylus and folding wax tablet

Βελλεροφόντης τὰ γράμματα
Bellerophóntēs tà grámmata
"Bellerophontic letter"
King Proetus dared not to kill a guest, so he sent Bellerophon to King Iobates, his father-in-law, bearing a sealed message in a folded tablet: "Pray remove the bearer from this world: he attempted to violate my wife, your daughter."

βρῶμα θεῶν
brôma theôn
"food of the gods"
Allegedly said by Nero of the poisoned mushrooms with which his mother Agrippina the Younger murdered Claudius.

== Γγ ==
Γηράσκω δ’ αἰεὶ πολλὰ διδασκόμενος.
Gēráskō d' aieì pollà didaskómenos.
"I grow old always learning many things."
Solon the Athenian, one of the seven Sages of Greece, on learning.

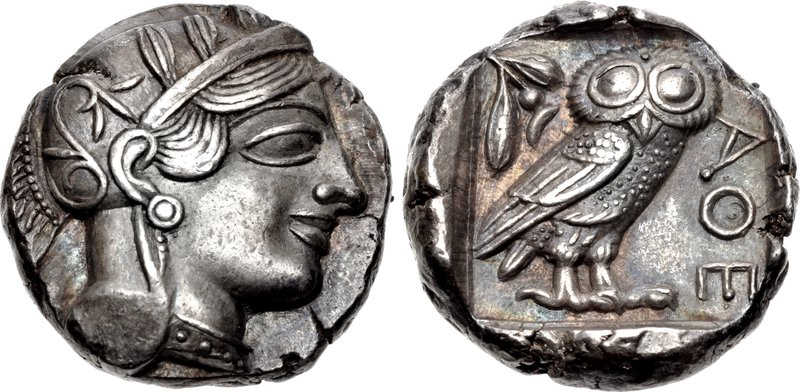
Athenian tetradrachm depicting goddess Athena (obverse) and owl (reverse); in daily use, Athenian drachmas were called glaukai, "owls"

γλαῦκ’ Ἀθήναζε / εἰς Ἀθήνας
glaûk’ Athēnaze / eis Athḗnaśnaze / eis Athḗnas
"Owls (Athenian drachmas) to Athens" — Aristophanes, The Birds, 302, also in 1106
E.g., coals to Newcastle, ice to the Eskimos.

Γνῶθι σεαυτόν.
Gnôthi seautón.
"Know thyself"
Aphorism inscribed over the entrance to the temple of Apollo at Delphi.

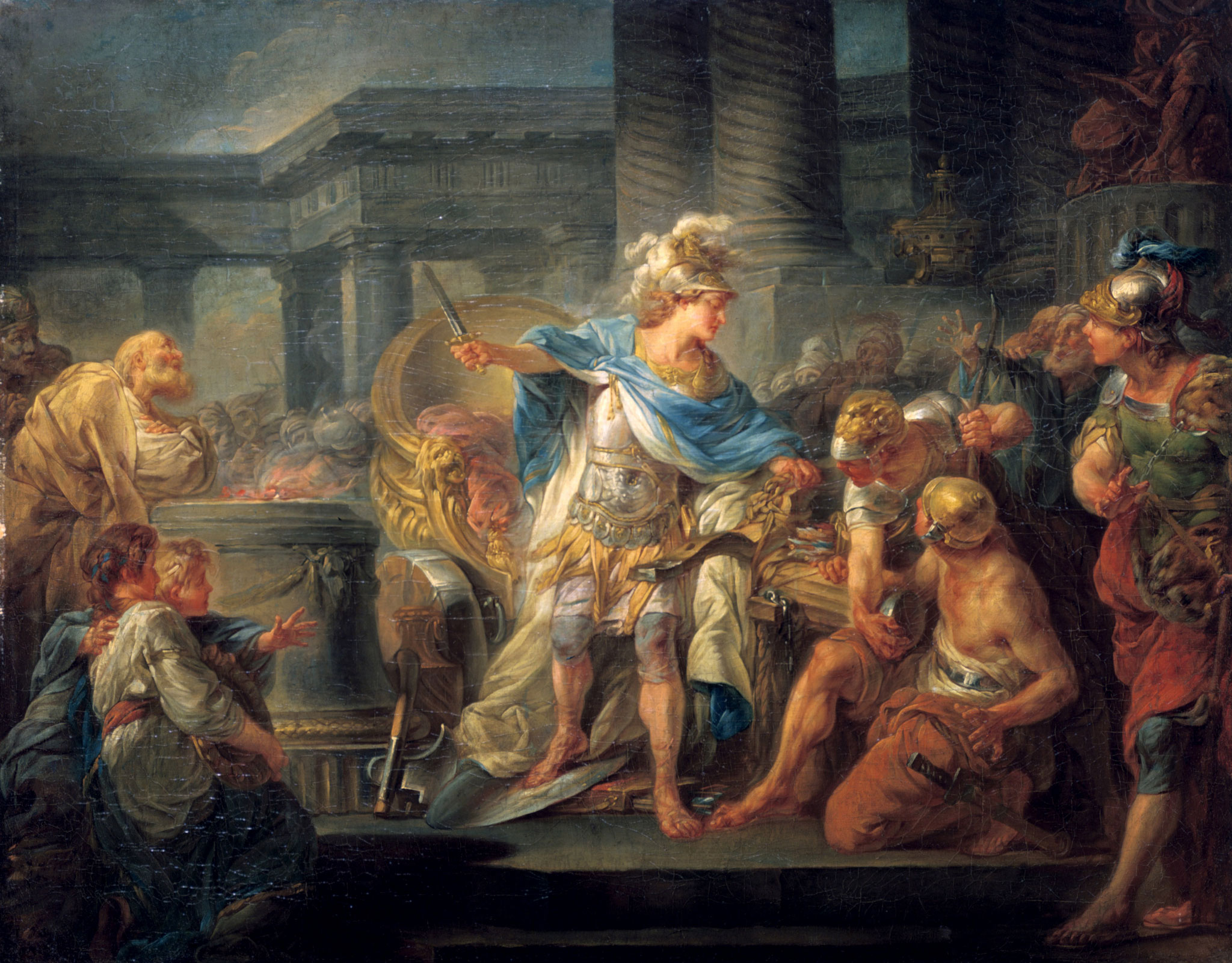
Alexander cuts the Gordian Knot, (Jean-Simon Berthélemy)

Γόρδιος δεσμός
Górdios desmós
"Gordian Knot"
The Gordian Knot is a legend associated with Alexander the Great. It is often used as a metaphor for an intractable problem, solved by a bold stroke

== Δδ ==
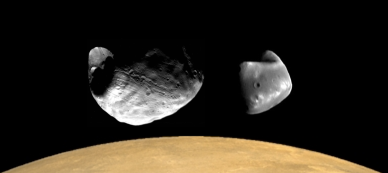
Deimos and Phobos Δεῖμος καὶ Φόβος

Δεῖμος καὶ Φόβος
Deîmos kaì Phóbos
"Horror and Fear"
Deimos and Phobos, the moons of Mars, are named after the sons of the Greek god Ares (Roman Mars): Deimos "horror" and Phobos "fear".

Δέσποτα, μέμνεο τῶν Ἀθηναίων.
Déspota, mémneo tôn Athēnaíōn.
"Master, remember the Athenians."
When Darius was informed that Sardis had been captured and burnt by the Athenians he was furious. He placed an arrow on his bow and shot it into the sky, praying to the deities to grant him vengeance on the Athenians. He then ordered one of his servants to say three times a day the above phrase in order to remind him that he should punish the Athenians.

διαίρει καὶ βασίλευε
diaírei kaì basíleue
"divide and rule"

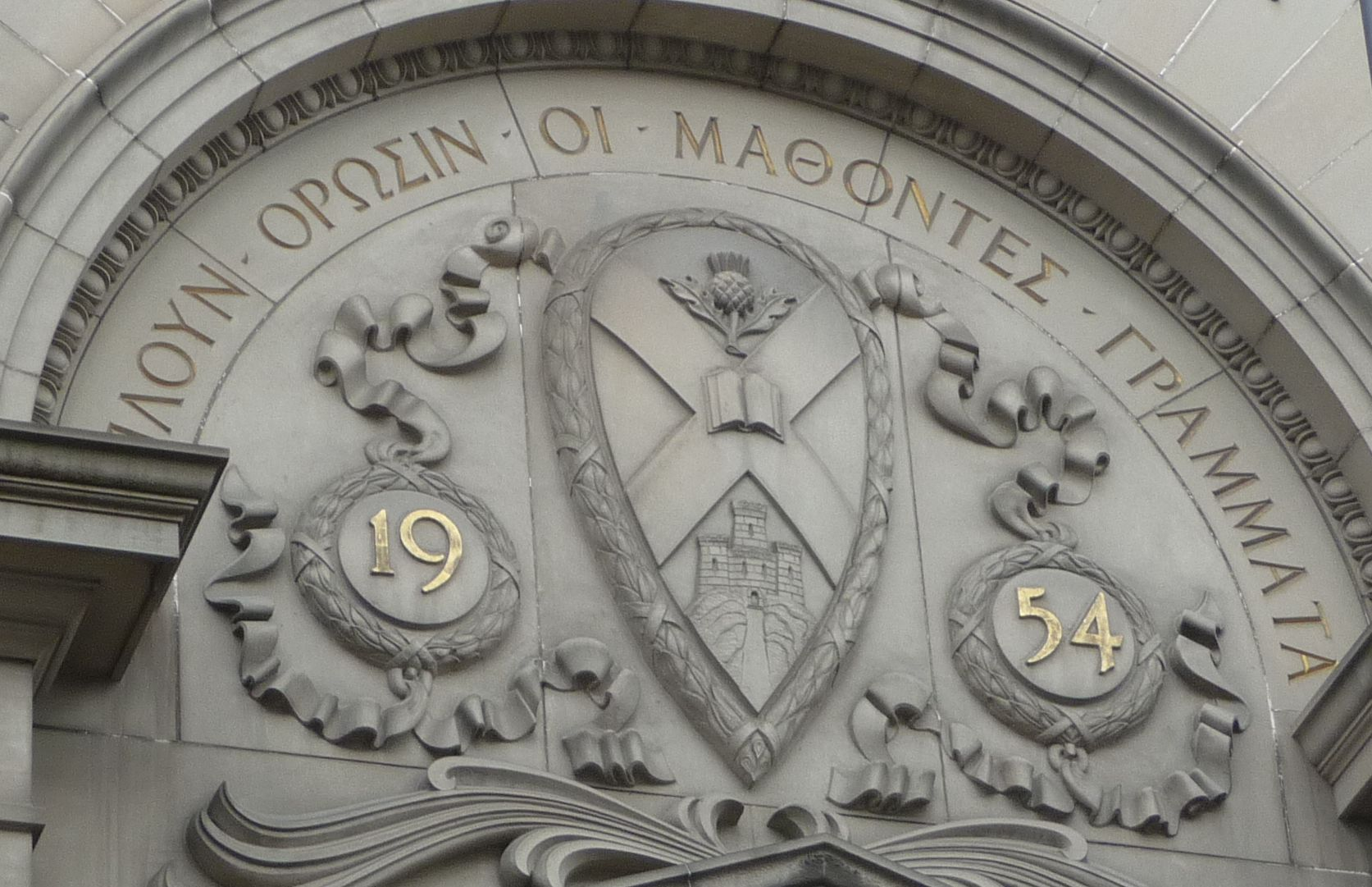
ΔΙΠΛΟΥΝ ΟΡΩΣΙΝ ΟΙ ΜΑΘΟΝΤΕΣ ΓΡΑΜΜΑΤΑ

Διπλοῦν ὁρῶσιν οἱ μαθόντες γράμματα.
Diploûn horôsin hoi mathóntes grámmata.
"Those who know the letters see double [twice as much as those who don't]."
Attributed to Pythagoras. — Inscription in Edinburgh from 1954: Διπλοῦν ὁρῶσιν οἱ μαθόντες γράμματα.

Δῶς μοι πᾶ στῶ καὶ τὰν γᾶν κινάσω.
Dôs moi pâ stô, kaì tàn gân kīnásō.
"Give me somewhere to stand, and I will move the earth."
Archimedes as quoted by Pappus of Alexandria, Synagoge, Book VIII.

== Εε ==
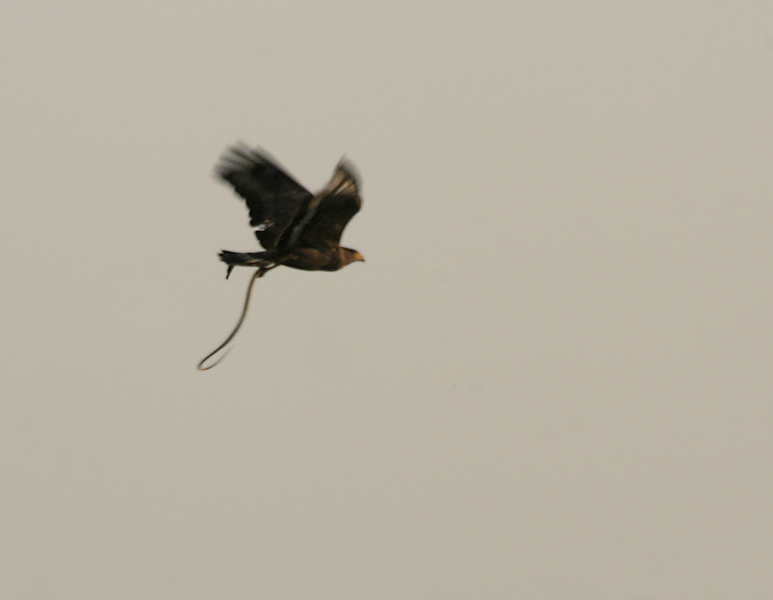
Eagle carrying a snake in its talons

Ἐὰν ᾖς φιλομαθής, ἔσει πολυμαθής.
Eàn êis philomathḗs, ései polumathḗs.
"If you are fond of learning, you will soon be full of learning."
Isocrates, To Demonicus 18

Εἷς οἰωνὸς ἄριστος, ἀμύνεσθαι περὶ πάτρης.
Heîs oiōnòs áristos, amúnesthai perì pátrēs.
"There is only one omen, to fight for one's country."
The Trojan prince Hector to his friend and lieutenant Polydamas when the latter was superstitious about a bird omen. The omen was an eagle that flew with a snake in its talons, still alive and struggling to escape. The snake twisted backward until it struck the bird on the neck, forcing the eagle to let the snake fall.

ἐκ τῶν ὧν οὐκ ἄνευ
ek tôn hôn ouk áneu
sine qua non
"without things which [one can]not [be] without"

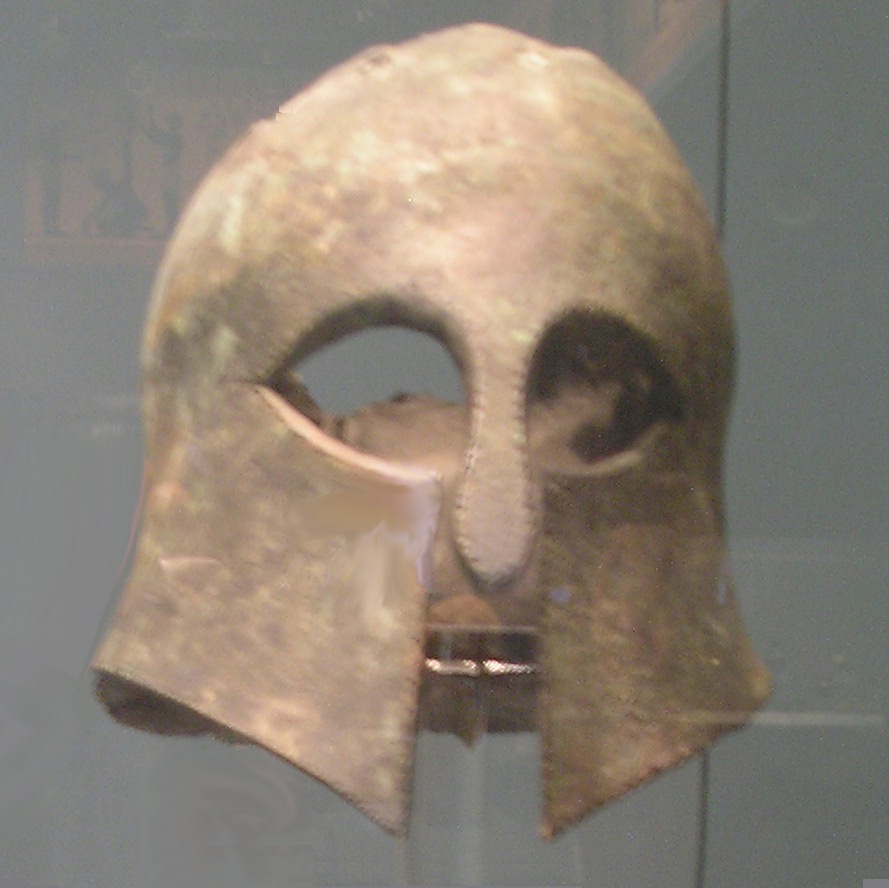
Helmet of an Athenian hoplite uncovered from the tomb at the Battle of Marathon

Ἑλλήνων προμαχοῦντες Ἀθηναῖοι Μαραθῶνι χρυσοφόρων Μήδων ἐστόρεσαν δύναμιν.
Hellḗnōn promakhoûntes Athēnaîoi Marathôni khrusophóron Mḗdōn estóresan dúnamin.
Fighting in the forefront of the Hellenes, the Athenians at Marathon brought low the Medes' gilded power.
Epigram by Simonides on the tomb of the Athenians who died in the Battle of Marathon.

Ἓν οἶδα ὅτι οὐδὲν οἶδα.
Hèn oîda hóti oudèn oîda.
"I know one thing, that I know nothing"
Socrates, paraphrased from Plato's Apology.

Ἔνθεν μὲν Σκύλλη, ἑτέρωθι δὲ δῖα Χάρυβδις.
Énthen mèn Skúllē, hetérōthi de dîa Khárubdis.
"On one side lay Scylla and on the other divine Charybdis."
Odysseus was forced to choose between Scylla and Charybdis, two mythical sea monsters, an expression commonly known as Between Scylla and Charybdis.

Ἐπεὶ δ' οὖν πάντες ὅσοι τε περιπολοῦσιν φανερῶς καὶ ὅσοι φαίνονται καθ' ὅσον ἂν ἐθέλωσιν θεοὶ γένεσιν ἔσχον, λέγει πρὸς αὐτοὺς ὁ τόδε τὸ πᾶν γεννήσας τάδε.
Epeì d' oûn pántes hósoi te peripoloûsin phanerôs kaì hósoi phaínontai kath' hóson àn ethélōsin theoì génesin éskhon, légei pròs autoùs ho tóde tò pân gennḗsas táde.́sas t
"When all of them, those gods who appear in their revolutions, as well as those other gods who appear at will had come into being, the creator of the universe addressed them the following." — Plato, Timaeus, 41a, on gods and the creator of the universe.

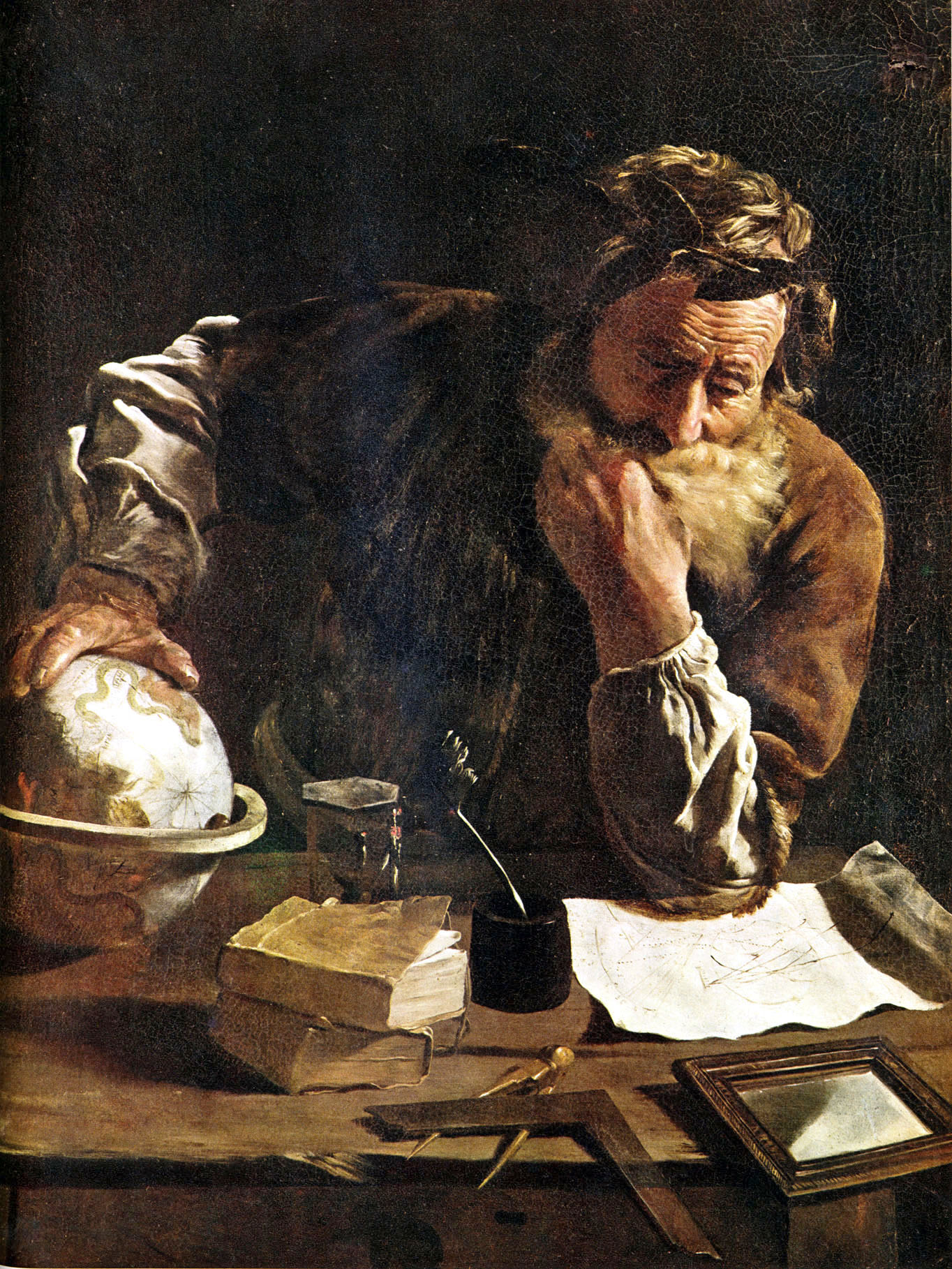
Archimedes, portrait by Domenico Fetti, (1620)

Εὕρηκα!
Heúrēka!
"I have found [it]!"
While Archimedes was taking a bath, he noticed that the level of the water rose as he got in, and he realized that the volume of water displaced must be equal to the volume of the part of his body he had submerged. This meant that the volume of irregular objects could be measured with precision, a previously intractable problem. He was so excited that he ran through the streets naked and still wet from his bath, crying "I have found it!".

Ἔτι μίαν μάχην Ῥωμαίους νικήσωμεν, ἀπολούμεϑα παντελῶς.
Éti mían mákhēn Rhōmaíous nikḗsōmen, apoloúmetha pantelôs.
"If we are victorious in one more battle with the Romans, we shall be utterly ruined."
Pyrrhus of Epirus commenting his victories (according to Plutarch, Life of Pyrrhus).

== Ζζ ==
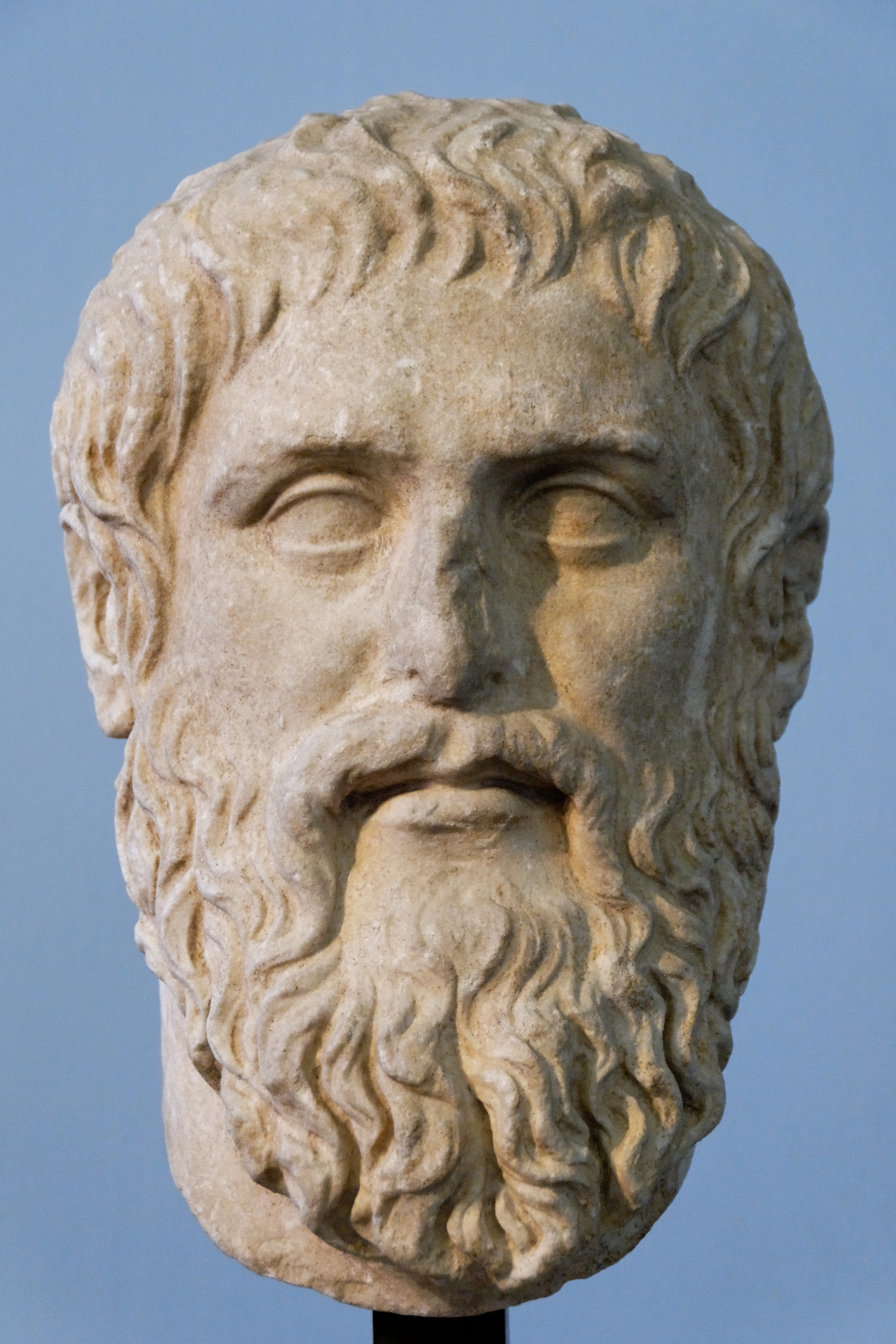
370 BC copy of marble statue of Plato

ζῷον δίπουν ἄπτερον
zôion dípoun ápteron
"two-legged featherless animal"
Plato's definition of humans, latinized as "Animal bipes implume"
To criticize this definition, Diogenes the Cynic plucked a chicken and brought it into Plato's Academy saying:

Οὗτός ἐστιν ὁ Πλάτωνος ἄνθρωπος.
Hoûtós estin o Plátōnos ánthrōpos.
"Here is Plato's man."

In response, Plato added to his definition:

πλατυώνυχον
platuṓnukhon
"Having broad nails"
As quoted by Diogenes Laërtius, Lives of Eminent Philosophers

ζῷον πολιτικόν
zôion politikón
"Man is by nature a political animal", i.e. animal of the polis or social being
Aristotle, Politics, book 1: ὁ ἄνθρωπος φύσει πολιτικὸν ζῷον

== Ηη ==
Maniot flag: Νίκη ἢ Θάνατος — ἢ τὰν ἢ ἐπὶ τᾶς "Victory or Death : Either With Your Shield or On It"

Ἢ τὰν ἢ ἐπὶ τᾶς.
Ḕ tàn ḕ epì tâs.
"Either [with] it [your shield], or on it."
Meaning "either you will win the battle, or you will die and then be carried back home on your shield; but you will not throw your shield away to flee."
It was said by Spartan mothers to their sons before they went out to battle to remind them of their bravery and duty to Sparta and Greece.

A hoplite could not escape the field of battle unless he tossed away the heavy and cumbersome shield. Therefore, "losing one's shield" meant desertion. (Plutarch, Moralia, 241)

Ἡ φύσις οὐδὲν ποιεῖ ἅλματα.
Hē phúsis oudèn poieî hálmata.
Natura non facit saltus.
"Nature does not make [sudden] jumps."
A principle of natural philosophies since Aristotle's time, the exact phrase coming from Carl von Linné.

Ἦλθον, εἶδον, ἐνίκησα.
Êlthon, eîdon, eníkēsa.
Veni, vidi, vici.
"I came, I saw, I conquered."
With these words, Julius Caesar described his victory against Pharnaces, according to Plutarch.

== Θθ ==
Θάλασσα καὶ πῦρ καὶ γυνή, κακὰ τρία.
Thálassa kaì pûr kaì gunḗ, kakà tría.
"Sea and fire and woman, three evils."

Θάλαττα, θάλαττα.
Thálatta, thálatta.
"The Sea! The Sea!"
Thalatta! Thalatta! from Xenophon's Anabasis. It was the shouting of joy when the roaming 10,000 Greeks saw Euxeinos Pontos (the Black Sea) from Mount Theches (Θήχης) in Armenia after participating in Cyrus the Younger's failed march against Persian Empire in the year 401 BC.

Θάνατος οὐδὲν διαφέρει τοῦ ζῆν.
Thánatos oudèn diaphérei toû zên.
"Death is no different from life."
Thales' philosophical view to the eternal philosophical question about life and death.

== Ιι ==
Ἰατρέ, θεράπευσον σεαυτόν.
Iatré, therápeuson seautón.
"Physician, take care of yourself!"
"Medice cura te ipsum."
An injunction urging physicians to care for and heal themselves first before dealing with patients. It was made famous in the Latin translation of the Bible, the Vulgate. The proverb was quoted by Jesus, recorded in the Gospel of Luke chapter 4:23. Luke the Evangelist was a physician.

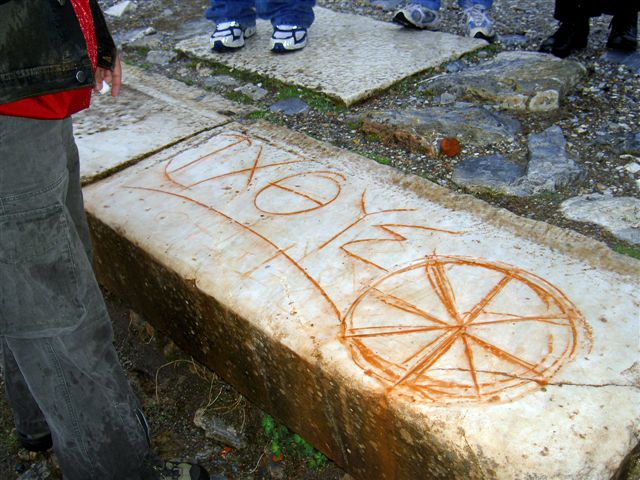
ΙΧΘΥΣ: Ἰησοῦς Χριστὸς Θεοῦ Υἱὸς Σωτήρ

Ἰησοῦς Χριστὸς Θεοῦ Υἱὸς Σωτήρ
Iēsoûs Khristòs Theoû Huiòs Sōtḗr
"Jesus Christ, Son of God, Saviour." As an acronym: ΙΧΘΥΣ (Ichthys) — "fish".

ἰσχύς μου ἡ ἀγάπη τοῦ λαοῦ.
Iskhús mou hē agápē toû laoû.
"The people's love [is] my strength."
Motto of the Royal House of Glücksburg.

Ἰχθὺς ἐκ τῆς κεφαλῆς ὄζειν ἄρχεται.
Ikhthùs ek tês kephalês ózein árkhetai.
"A fish starts to stink from the head."
Greek equivalent of the English phrase "A fish rots from the head down"; attested in fifteenth century CE Paroemiae of Michael Apostolius Paroemiographus; similarly found in the adages of Erasmus as piscis primum a capite foetet ("The fish stinks first from the head").

== Κκ ==
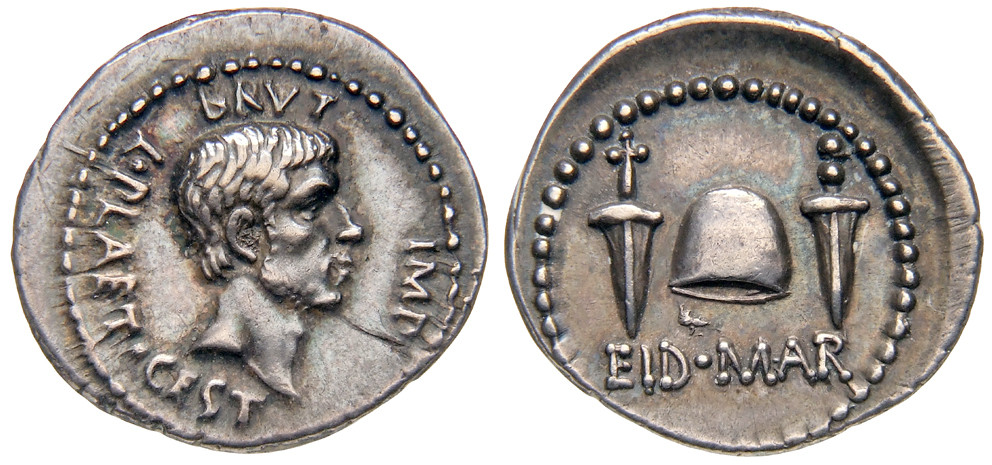
Marcus Junius Brutus

Καὶ σὺ τέκνον;
Kaì sù téknon?
"You too, child?" or "You too, young man?"
On March 15, 44 BC, Julius Caesar was attacked by a group of senators, including Marcus Junius Brutus, a senator and Caesar's adopted son. Suetonius (in De Vita Caesarum, LXXXII) reported that some people thought that, when Caesar saw Brutus, he spoke those words and resigned himself to his fate. Among English speakers, much better known are the Latin words Et tu, Brute?, which William Shakespeare gave to Caesar in his play, Julius Caesar (act 3, scene 1,85). This means simply "You too, Brutus?"

κακοδαιμονισταί
kakodaimonistaí
"Worshippers of the evil demon"
The name of a dining club in ancient Athens ridiculing Athenian tradition and the gods.

Κακοῦ κόρακος κακὸν ᾠόν.
Kakoû kórakos kakòn ōión.
"From a bad crow, a bad egg"
I.e. like father, like son.

Κακὸς ἀνὴρ μακρόβιος.
Kakòs anḕr makróbios.
"A bad man lives long."

καλλίστῃ
kallístēi
"for the prettiest one", "to the most beautiful"
From the myth of the Golden Apple of Discord.

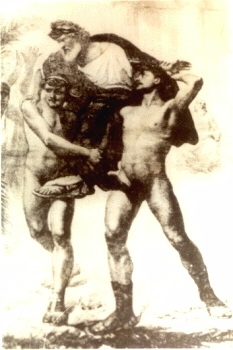
Diagoras of Rhodes carried in the stadium by his two sons

Κάτθανε, Διαγόρα, οὐ καὶ ἐς Ὄλυμπον ἀναβήσῃ
Kátthane, Diagóra, ou kaì es Ólumpon anabḗsēi.
"Die, Diagoras — you will certainly not ascend Olympus."
A Spartan spectator to Diagoras of Rhodes, a former Olympic champion himself, during the 79th Olympiad, when his two sons became Olympic champions and carried him around the stadium on their shoulders.

Κοινὰ τὰ φίλων.
Koinà tà phílōn.
"The things of friends are common"
The proverb is mentioned in the Republic of Plato (424A and 449C) as a principle to be applied to marriage and procreation. Diogenes Laertius (VIII.10) reports the assertion of Timaeus that Pythagoras was first to use the saying, along with φιλία ἰσότης (philía isótēs) "Friendship is equality."

Κρῆτες ἀεὶ ψεῦσται.
Krêtes aeì pseûstai.
"Cretans always lie" — One of the earliest logical paradoxes attributed to Epimenides of Knossos known as the Epimenides paradox. As Epimenides is a Cretan himself, it leads to the conclusion that the above statement is not true, hence the paradox.

κτῆμα ἐς ἀεί
ktêma es aeí
"possession for eternity" (Thucydides, History of the Peloponnesian War 1.22; "κτῆμά τε ἐς αἰεὶ [ktêma te es aieí]" in the original).

Κύριε ἐλέησον
Kúrie eléēson
"Lord have mercy" — a very common phrase in Greek Orthodox liturgies, and also used in Greek in the Roman Catholic Mass.

== Λλ ==
Λάθε βιώσας.
Láthe biṓsas
"Live hidden."
An Epicurean phrase, because of his belief that politics troubles men and doesn't allow them to reach inner peace. So Epicurus suggested that everybody should live "Hidden" far from cities, not even considering a political career. Cicero criticized this idea because, as a stoic, he had a completely different opinion of politics, but the sentiment is echoed by Ovid's statement bene qui latuit bene vixit ("he has lived well who has stayed well hidden", Tristia 3.4.25). Plutarch elaborated in his essay Is the Saying "Live in Obscurity" Right? (Εἰ καλῶς εἴρηται τὸ λάθε βιώσας) 1128c.

Λέγειν τὰ λεγόμενα.
Légein tà legómena.
Prodenda, quia prodita or Relata refero.
"I tell as I was told" or "I report reports"
From Herodotus (7,152 etc.):
Ἐγὼ δὲ ὀφείλω λέγειν τὰ λεγόμενα, πείθεσθαί γε μὲν οὐ παντάπασι ὀφείλω.
Egṑ dè opheílō légein tà legómena, peíthesthaí ge mèn ou pantápasi opheílō.

And I must tell what I am told, since I don't have to be persuaded completely.

== Μμ ==
Ματαιότης ματαιοτήτων, τὰ πάντα ματαιότης.
Mataiótēs mataiotḗtōn, tà pánta mataiótes.
"Vanity of vanities, and everything is vanity."
Ecclesiastes 1:2

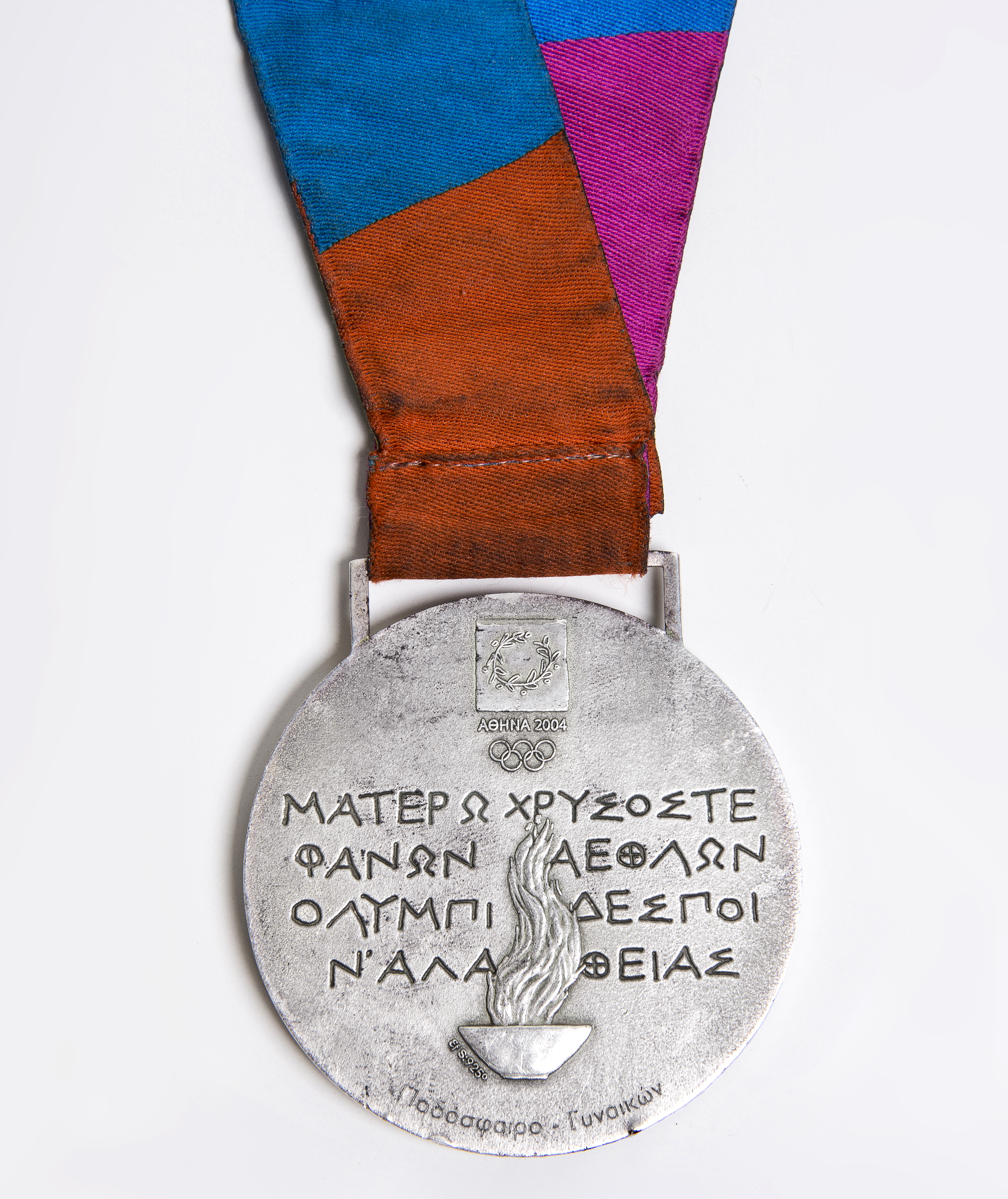
Silver medal from the 2004 Summer Olympics, with a quote from Pindar

Μᾶτερ ὦ χρυσοστεφάνων ἀέθλων, Οὐλυμπία, δέσποιν᾽ ἀλαθείας.
Mater ō chrysostephanōn aethlōn, Oulympia, despoin' alatheias
"O mother of the golden-crowned games, Olympia, mistress of truth."
This verse, written by Pindar, was used on the reverse of the winners' medals for the 2004 Summer Olympics in Athens.

Μέτρον ἄριστον.
Métron áriston.
"Moderation is best"
On occasions where neither too much nor too little is a good choice, as when eating or celebrating. Cleobulus, according to Diogenes Laërtius.

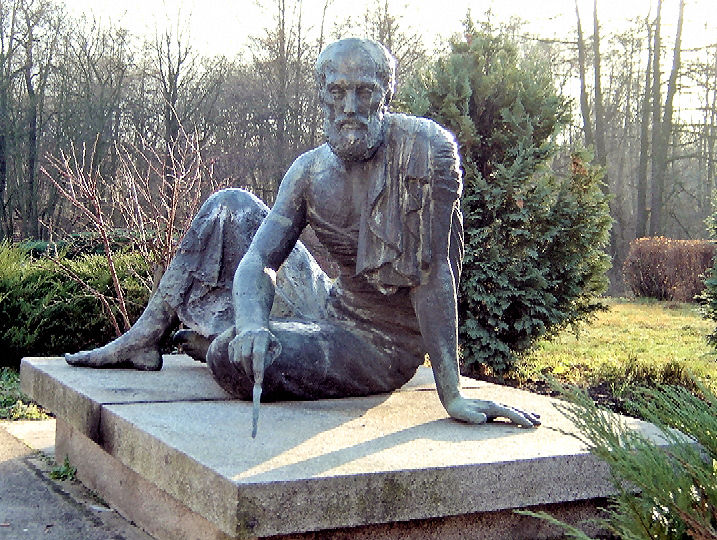
Archimedes: Μὴ μοῦ τοὺς κύκλους τάραττε

Μὴ μοῦ τοὺς κύκλους τάραττε.
Mḕ moû toùs kúklous táratte.
"Do not disturb my circles."
The last words attributed to Archimedes (paraphrased from Valerius Maximus' Memorable Doings and Sayings). During the raid of Syracuse by the Romans, Archimedes was busy drawing mathematical circles. He was eventually attacked and killed by a Roman soldier as he was too engrossed in thought to obey the soldier's orders.

Μὴ χεῖρον βέλτιστον.
Mḕ kheîron béltiston.
"The least bad [choice] is the best."
The lesser of two evils principle known from the Platonean times.

Μηδὲν ἄγαν.
Mēdèn ágan.
"Nothing in excess."
Inscription from the temple of Apollo at Delphi

Μῆλον τῆς Ἔριδος
Mêlon tês Éridos
"Apple of Discord"
goddess Eris tossed the Apple of Discord "to the fairest". Paris was the judge of the prettiest one.

Μηκέτι ὑδροπότει, ἀλλ’ οἴνῳ ὀλίγῳ χρῶ διὰ τὸν στόμαχον καὶ τὰς πυκνάς σου ἀσθενείας.
Mēkéti hudropótei, all' oínōi olígōi khrô dià tòn stómakhon kaì tàs puknás sou astheneías.
Stop drinking only water, but take a little wine for your stomach and your frequent illnesses.
From I Timothy 5:23

Μολὼν λαβέ!
Molṑn labé!
"Come take [them]!"
King Leonidas of Sparta, in response to King Xerxes of Persia's demand that the Greek army lay down their arms before the Battle of Thermopylae.

μυστήριον τῆς πίστεως
mustḗrion tês písteōs
"mystery of faith", from I Timothy 3:9.
Latinized as Mysterium Fidei is a Christian theological term.

== Νν ==
ναὶ ναί, οὒ οὔ·
naì naí, où oú;
"Yes yes, no no;"
Gospel of Matthew, Chapter 5
"33 Again, you have heard that it was said to the people long ago, 'Do not break your oath, but keep the oaths you have made to the Lord.' 34 But I tell you, Do not swear at all: either by heaven, for it is God's throne; 35 or by the earth, for it is his footstool; or by Jerusalem, for it is the city of the Great King. 36 And do not swear by your head, for you cannot make even one hair white or black. 37 Simply let your 'Yes' be 'Yes,' and your 'No,' 'No'; anything beyond this comes from the evil one."

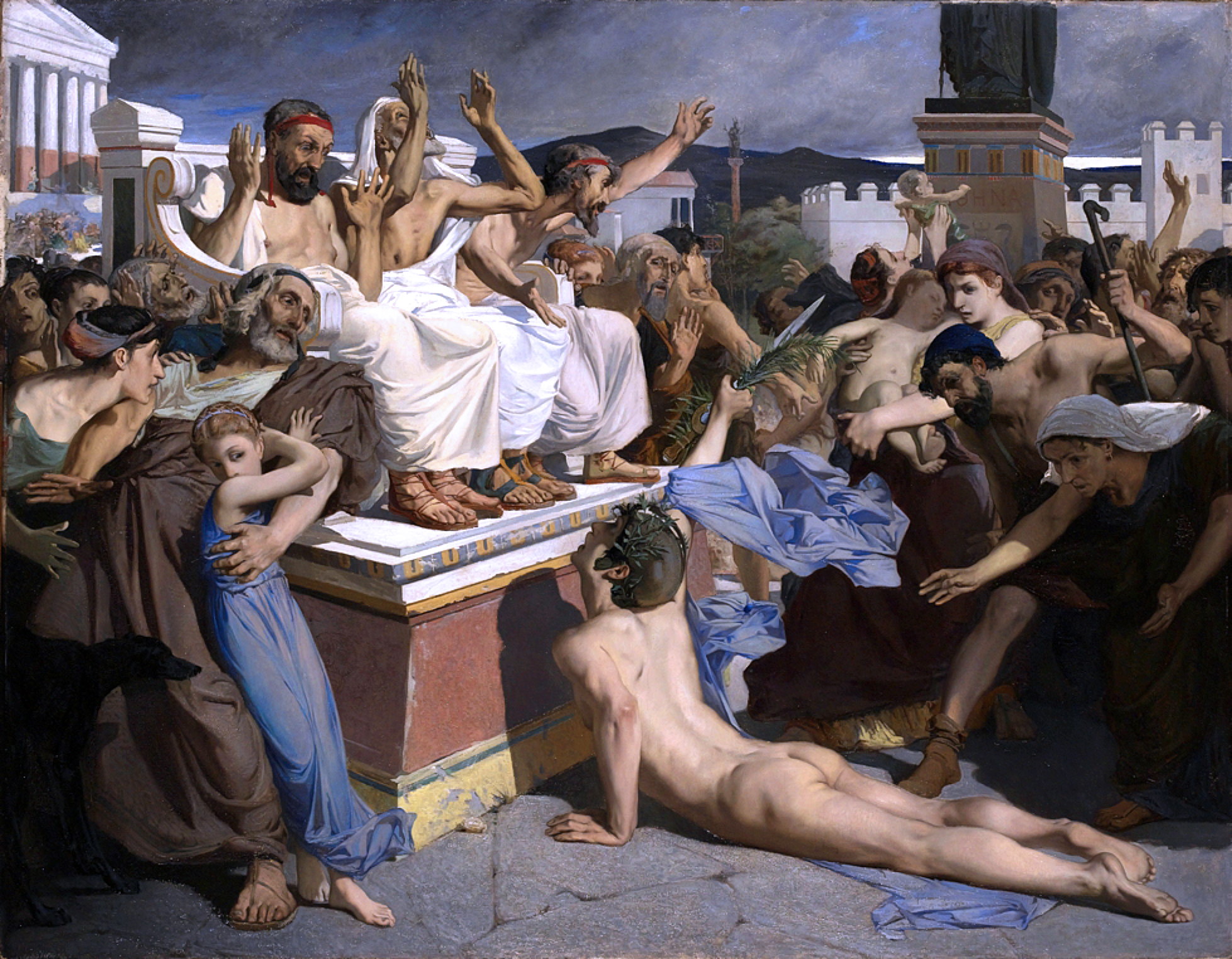
Painting of Pheidippides as he gave word of the Greek victory over Persia at the Battle of Marathon to the people of Athens, by Luc-Olivier Merson, 1869

Νενικήκαμεν.
Nenikḗkamen.
"We have won."
The traditional story relates that the Athenian herald Pheidippides ran the 40 km (25 mi) from the battlefield near the town of Marathon to Athens to announce the Greek victory over Persia in the Battle of Marathon (490 BC) with the word 'We have won' and collapsed and died on the spot because of exhaustion.

Νίψον ἀνομήματα μὴ μόναν ὄψιν.
Nípson anomḗmata mḕ mónan ópsin.
"Wash the sins, not only the face."
A palindromic inscription attributed to Gregory of Nazianzus, inscribed in Hagia Sophia and on many church fonts. In the Greek alphabet, the /ps/ sound is rendered by the single letter ψ (psi).

== Ξξ ==
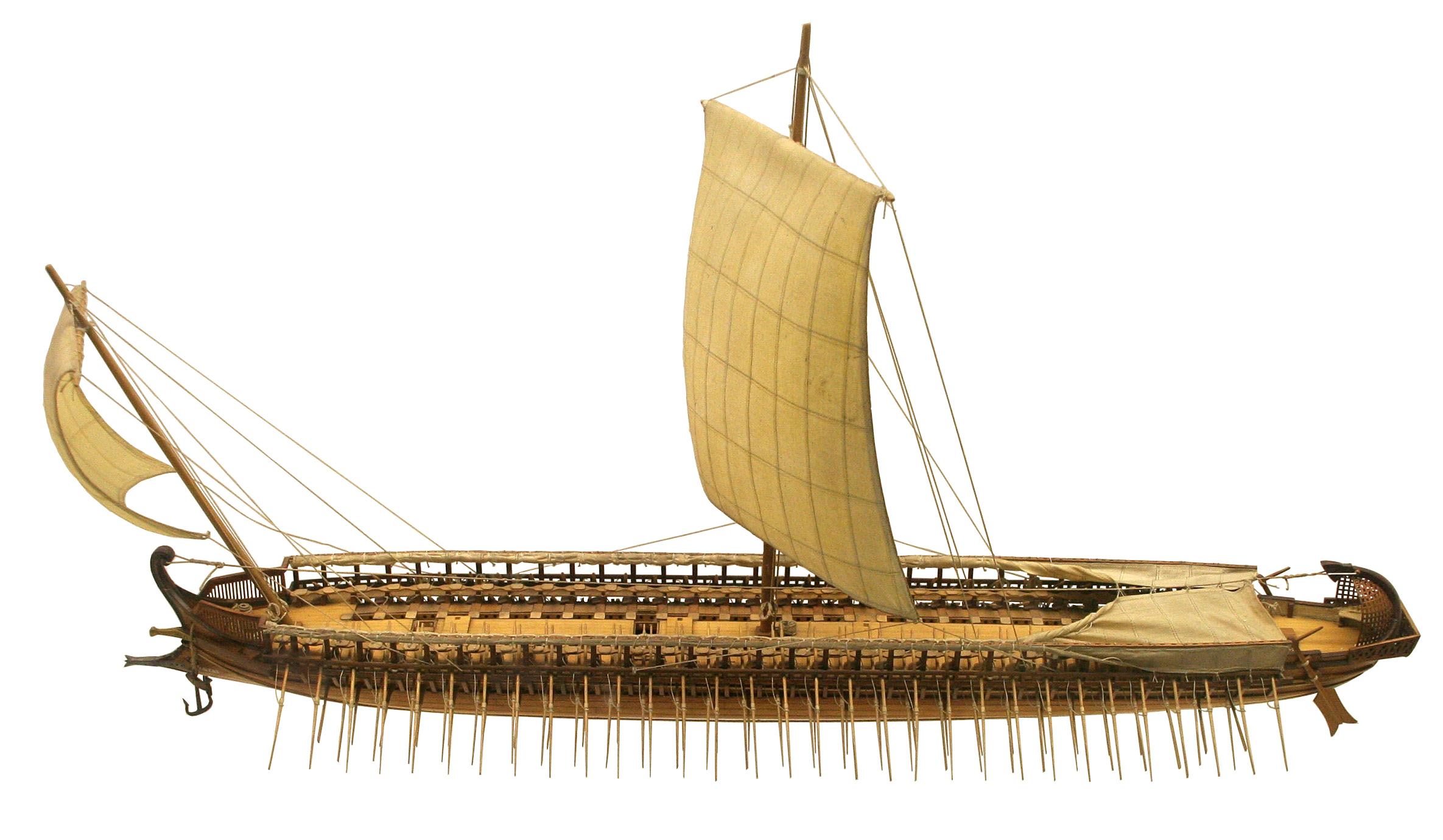
Trireme during the Persian Wars

Ξένος ὢν ἀκολούθει τοῖς ἐπιχωρίοις νόμοις.
Xénos ṑn akoloúthei toîs epikhōríois nómois.
"As a foreigner, follow the laws of that country."
Loosely, "Do in Rome as Rome does." Quotation from the works of Menander.

ξύλινον τεῖχος
xúlinon teîkhos
"wooden defensive wall"
The "walls" of ships during the Persian Wars.

== Οο ==
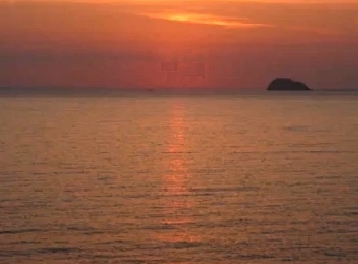
οἶνοψ πόντος — wine dark sea

οἶνοψ πόντος
oînops póntos
"Wine dark sea"
A common Homeric epithet of the sea, on which many articles have been written. (Further: Sea in culture)

ὅπερ ἔδει δεῖξαι (ΟΕΔ)
hóper édei deîxai (abbreviated as OED)
"quod erat demonstrandum"
"what was required to be proved"
Used by early mathematicians including Euclid (Elements, 1.4), Aristotle (APo.90b34), and Archimedes, written at the end of a mathematical proof or philosophical argument, to signify the proof as complete. Later it was latinized as "QED" or the Halmos tombstone box symbol.

Ὁ σῴζων ἑαυτὸν σωθήτω.
Ho sṓizōn heautòn sōthḗtō.
"he who saves himself may be saved."
Used in cases of destruction or calamity, such as an unorderly evacuation. Each one is responsible for himself and is not to wait for any help.

Οὐ φροντὶς Ἱπποκλείδῃ.
Ou phrontìs Hippokleídēi.
"Hippocleides doesn't care."
From a story in Herodotus (6.129), in which Hippocleides loses the chance to marry Cleisthenes' daughter after getting drunk and dancing on his head. Herodotus says the phrase was a common expression in his own day.

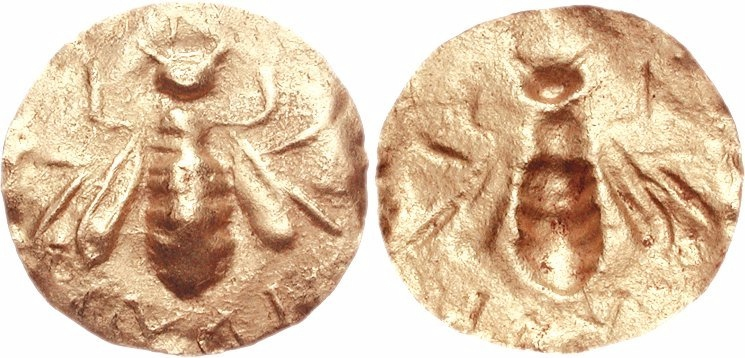
Charon's obol. 5th-1st century BC. All of these pseudo-coins have no sign of attachment, are too thin for normal use, and are often found in burial sites.

Οὐκ ἂν λάβοις παρὰ τοῦ μὴ ἔχοντος.
Ouk àn labois parà toû mḕ ékhontos.
"You can't get blood out of a stone." (Literally, "You can't take from one who doesn't have.")
Menippus to Charon when the latter asked Menippus to give him an obol to convey him across the river to the underworld.

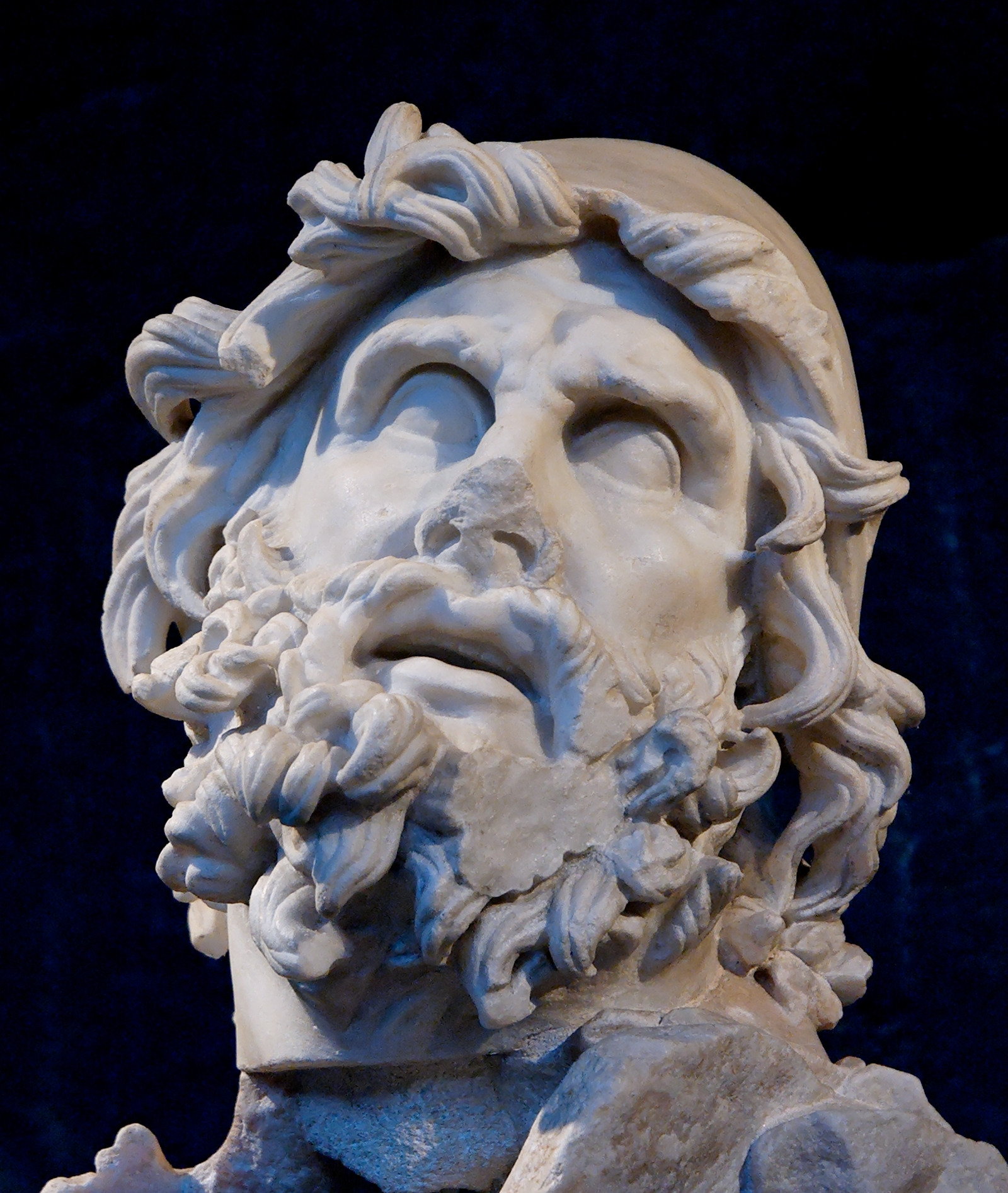
Odysseus, Sperlonga sculptures

Οὖτις ἐμοί γ' ὄνομα.
Oûtis emoí g' ónoma.
"My name is Nobody".
Odysseus to Polyphemus when asked what his name was. (Homer, Odyssey, ix, 366).

== Ππ ==
Πάντα ῥεῖ.
Pánta rheî.
"All is flux; everything flows" – This phrase was either not spoken by Heraclitus or did not survive as a quotation of his. This famous aphorism used to characterize Heraclitus' thought comes from Simplicius, a Neoplatonist, and from Plato's Cratylus. The word rhei (ρέι, cf. rheology) is the Greek word for "to stream"; according to Plato's Cratylus, it is related to the etymology of Rhea.

πάντοτε ζητεῖν τὴν ἀλήθειαν
pántote zeteῖn tḕn alḗtheian
"ever seeking the truth" — Diogenes Laërtius, Lives of Eminent Philosophers — a characteristic of Pyrrhonism. An abbreviated form, ζητεῖν τὴν ἀλήθειαν ("seek the truth").

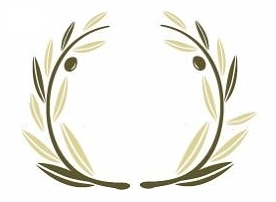
Kotinos, the prize for the winner at the Ancient Olympic Games

Παπαί, Μαρδόνιε, κοίους ἐπ' ἄνδρας ἤγαγες μαχησομένους ἡμέας, οἳ οὐ περὶ χρημάτων τὸν ἀγῶνα ποιεῦνται ἀλλὰ περὶ ἀρετῆς.
Papaí, Mardónie, koíous ep' ándras ḗgages makhēsoménous hēméas, hoì ou perì khrēmátōn tòn agôna poieûntai allà perì aretês.
"Good heavens! Mardonius, what kind of men have you brought us to fight against? Men who do not compete for possessions, but for honour."
Spontaneous response of Tigranes, a Persian general while Xerxes was interrogating some Arcadians after the Battle of Thermopylae. Xerxes asked why there were so few Greek men defending the Thermopylae. The answer was "All the other men are participating in the Olympic Games". And when asked "What is the prize for the winner?", "An olive-wreath" came the answer. — Herodotus, The Histories

Πάθει μάθος.
Páthei máthos.
"(There is) learning in suffering/experience", or "Knowledge/knowing, or wisdom, or learning, through suffering."
Aeschylus, Agamemnon, 177
The variant πάθος μάθος means "suffering is learning/learning is suffering."

Πῆμα κακὸς γείτων, ὅσσον τ’ ἀγαθὸς μέγ’ ὄνειαρ.
Pêma kakòs geítōn, hósson t' agathòs még' óneiar.
"A bad neighbor is a calamity as much as a good one is a great advantage."

πίστις, ἐλπίς, ἀγάπη
pístis, elpís, agápē
"faith, hope, (and) love" (1 Corinthians 13:13.)

Πόλεμος πάντων μὲν πατήρ ἐστι.
Pólemos pántōn mèn patḗr esti.
"War is the father of all" — Heraclitus
The complete text of this fragment by Heraclitus is: πόλεμος πάντων μὲν πατήρ ἐστι, πάντων δὲ βασιλεύς, καὶ τοὺς μὲν θεοὺς ἔδειξε τοὺς δὲ ἀνθρώπους, τοὺς μὲν δούλους ἐποίησε τοὺς δὲ ἐλευθέρους (War is the father of all and the king of all; and some he has made gods and some men, some bond and some free).

Πύξ, λάξ, δάξ.
Púx, láx, dáx.
"With fists, kicks, and bites"
Πύξ "with fists", λάξ "with kicks", δάξ "with bites"
Epigram describing how laypersons were chased away from the Eleusinian Mysteries.

== Ρρ ==
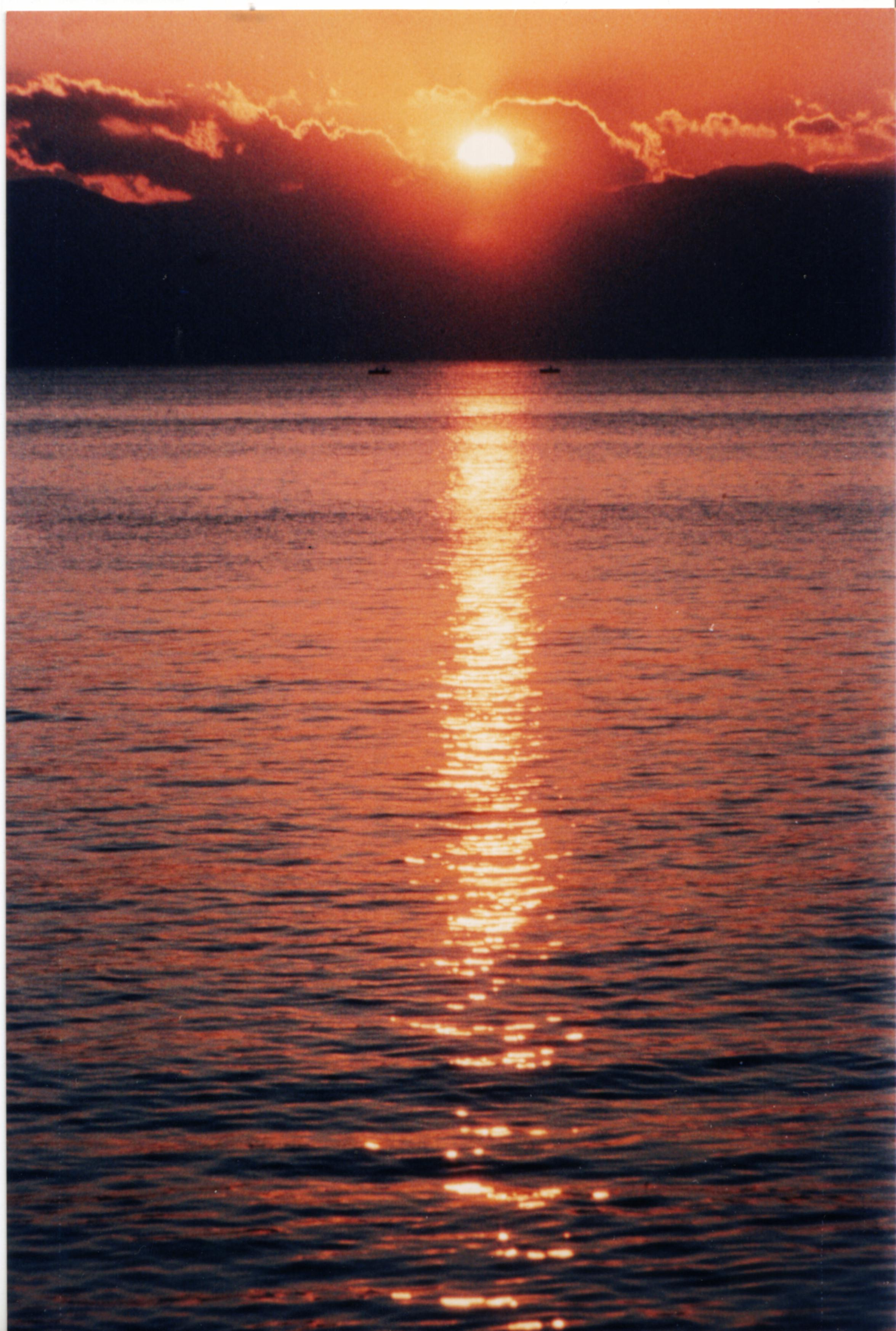
Rosy-fingered Dawn

ῥοδοδάκτυλος Ἠώς
rhododáktulos Ēṓs
"rosy-fingered Dawn"
This phrase occurs frequently in the Homeric poems referring to Eos, the Titanic goddess of the dawn. Eos opened the gates of heaven so that Helios could ride his chariot across the sky every day.

== Σσ ==
Σπεῦδε βραδέως.
Speûde bradéōs.
"Hasten slowly" (cf. Latin festina lente), "make haste slowly".
According to Suetonius the phrase "σπεῦδε βραδέως, ἀσφαλὴς γάρ ἐστ᾽ ἀμείνων ἢ θρασὺς στρατηλάτης" was a favorite of Augustus as he often quoted it.

Σὺν Ἀθηνᾷ καὶ χεῖρα κίνει.
Sùn Athēnâi kaì kheîra kínei.
"Along with Athena, move also your hand" — predecessor to the English "God helps those who help themselves."
Appears in Aesop's fable "The Shipwrecked Man" (Ἀνὴρ ναυαγός, Perry 30, Chambry 53).

== Ττ ==
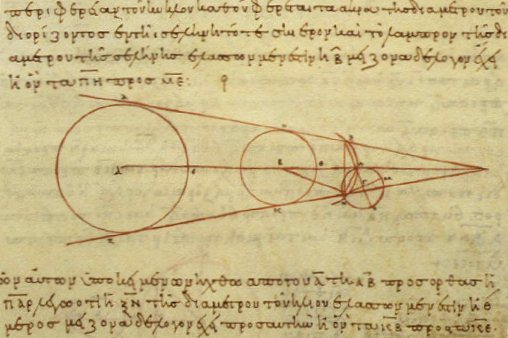
Aristarchus's third century BC calculations on the relative sizes of the Earth, Sun, and Moon, from a tenth-century CE Greek copy

Τὰ μὲν ἀπλανέα τῶν ἄστρων καὶ τὸν ἅλιον μένειν ἀκίνητον, τὰν δὲ γᾶν περιφέρεσθαι περὶ τὸν ἅλιον.
Tà mèn aplanéa tôn ástrōn kaì tòn hálion ménein akínēton, tàn dè gân periphéresthai perì tòn hálion.
"The fixed stars and the Sun remain unmoved, while the Earth revolves about the Sun." — Archimedes' description of the heliocentric model in his work The Sand Reckoner, based on the work by Aristarchus of Samos.

Τὰ πάντα ῥεῖ καὶ οὐδὲν μένει.
Tà pánta rheî kaì oudèn ménei.
"Everything flows, nothing stands still."
Attributed to Heraclitus — Plato, in his dialogue Cratylus, recounts Heraclitus' saying:

Τὰ ὄντα ἰέναι τε πάντα καὶ μένειν οὐδέν.
Tà ónta iénai te pánta kaì ménein oudén.
"[That] things that exist move and nothing remains still", which he expands:
Πάντα χωρεῖ καὶ οὐδὲν μένει καὶ δὶς ἐς τὸν αὐτὸν ποταμὸν οὐκ ἂν ἐμβαίης.
Pánta khōreî kaì oudèn ménei kaì dìs es tòn autòn potamòn ouk àn embaíēs.
"All things move and nothing remains still, and you cannot step twice into the same stream".

Τάδ' ἐστὶ Πελοπόννησος, οὐκ Ἰωνία.
Tád' estì Pelopónnēsos, ouk Iōnía.
"Here is Peloponnesus, not Ionia" — Inscription written on a pillar erected by Theseus on the Isthmus of Corinth facing toward the West, i.e. toward the Peloponnese.

Τάδ' οὐχὶ Πελοπόννησος, ἀλλ' Ἰωνία.
Tád' oukhì Pelopónnēsos, all' Iōnía.
"Here is not Peloponnesus, but Ionia" — inscription as per above, but toward East, i.e. toward Attica.

Τῆς παιδείας ἔφη τὰς μὲν ῥίζας εἶναι πικράς, τὸν δὲ καρπὸν γλυκύν.
Tês paideías éphē tàs mèn rhízas eînai pikrás, tòn dè karpòn glukún.
"The roots of education are bitter, but the fruit is sweet." - Aristotle

Τὶ δύσκολον; Τὸ ἑαυτὸν γνῶναι.
Tì dúskolon? Tò heautòn gnônai.
"What is hard? To know thyself." — attributed (among other sages) to Thales, according to Pausanias

Oedipus and the sphinx, on an Attic red-figure kylix

Τί ἐστιν ὃ μίαν ἔχον φωνὴν τετράπουν καὶ δίπουν καὶ τρίπουν γίνεται;
Tí estin hò mían ékhon phōnḕn tetrápoun kaì dípoun kaì trípoun gínetai?
"What is that which has one voice and yet becomes four-footed and two-footed and three-footed?" — The famous riddle of the Sphinx. Oedipus solved the riddle correctly by answering: "Man: as an infant, he crawls on fours; as an adult, he walks on two legs and; in old age, he uses a walking stick".

Τὶ εὔκολον; Τὸ ἄλλῳ ὑποτίθεσθαι.
Tì eúkolon? Tò állōi hupotíthesthai.
"What is easy? To advise another." — Thales

Τὶ καινὸν εἴη τεθεαμένος; Γέροντα τύραννον.
Tì kainòn eíē tetheaménos? Géronta túrannon.
"What is the strangest thing to see? "An aged tyrant." — Thales

Τὶ κοινότατον; Ἐλπίς. Καὶ γὰρ οἷς ἄλλο μηδέν, αὔτη παρέστη.
Tì koinótaton? Elpís. Kaì gàr hoîs állo mēdén, aútē paréstē.
"What is quite common? Hope. When all is gone, there is still hope. Literally: "Because even to those who have nothing else, it is still nearby." — Thales

Τὶ τάχιστον; Νοῦς. Διὰ παντὸς γὰρ τρέχει.
Tì tákhiston? Noûs. Dià pantòs gàr trékhei.
"What is the fastest? The mind. It travels through everything." — Thales

Τὶ πρότερον γεγόνοι, νὺξ ἢ ἡμέρα; "νύξ, μιᾷ ἡμέρᾳ πρότερον.
Tì próteron gegónoi, nùx ḕ hēméra? núx, miâi hēmérāi próteron.
"Which is older, day or night? "Night is the older, by one day." — Thales

Τὸ γὰρ ἡδύ, ἐὰν πολύ, οὐ τί γε ἡδύ.
Tò gàr hēdú, eàn polú, ou tí ge hēdú.
"A sweet thing tasted too often is no longer sweet."

Τὸ δὶς ἐξαμαρτεῖν οὐκ ἀνδρὸς σοφοῦ.
Tò dìs examarteîn ouk andròs sophoû.
"To make the same mistake twice [is] not [a sign] of a wise man."

Τὸ πεπρωμένον φυγεῖν ἀδύνατον.
Tò peprōménon phugeîn adúnaton.
"It's impossible to escape from what is destined."

== Υυ ==
υἱὸς μονογενής
huiòs monogenḗs
"Only-begotten son" From John 3:16: Οὕτως γὰρ ἠγάπησεν ὁ θεὸς τὸν κόσμον, ὥστε τὸν υἱὸν τὸν μονογενῆ ἔδωκεν. [Oútōs gàr ēgápēsen ho Theòs tòn kósmon, hṓste tòn huiòn tòn monogenê édōken.] "For God so loved the world that He gave His only begotten Son" and see John 1:14
The expression later appears in the Niceno-Constantinopolitan Creed: Καὶ εἰς ἕνα Κύριον Ἰησοῦν Χριστόν, τὸν Υἱὸν τοῦ Θεοῦ τὸν μονογενῆ [Kaì eis éna Kúrion Iēsoun Christón, tòn Huiòn toû Theoû tòn monogenê]; Et in unum Dominum Iesum Christum, Filium Dei Unigenitum; And in one Lord Jesus Christ, the only-begotten Son of God.
Unigenitus (named for its Latin opening words Unigenitus dei filius, or "Only-begotten Son of God") is an apostolic constitution in the form of a papal bull promulgated by Pope Clement XI in 1713.

ὕστερον πρότερον
hústeron próteron
"The latter one first"
Rhetorical device in which the most important action is placed first, even though it happens after the other action. The standard example comes from the Aeneid of Virgil (2.353):
Moriamur, et in media arma ruamus "Let us die, and charge into the thick of the fight".

== Φφ ==
The Phoenician alphabet as used on the Mesha Stele (the Moabite Stone)

Φοινικήϊα γράμματα
Phoinikḗïa grámmata
"Phoenician letters"
The Phoenician prince Cadmus was generally accredited by Greeks such as Herodotus with the introduction of the Phoenician alphabet several centuries before the Trojan war, circa 2000 BC.

Φρονεῖν γὰρ οἱ ταχεῖς οὐκ ἀσφαλεῖς.
Phroneîn gàr hoi takheîs ouk asphaleîs.
"Those who make quick decisions are not safe."

== Χχ ==
Χαλεπὰ τὰ καλά.
Khalepà tà kalá.
"The good/beautiful things [are] difficult [to attain]."
"Naught without labor."
"[What is] good/beautiful [is] troublesome."
Cf. Plato, Republic 4, 435c; Hippias Major, 304e

== Ψψ ==
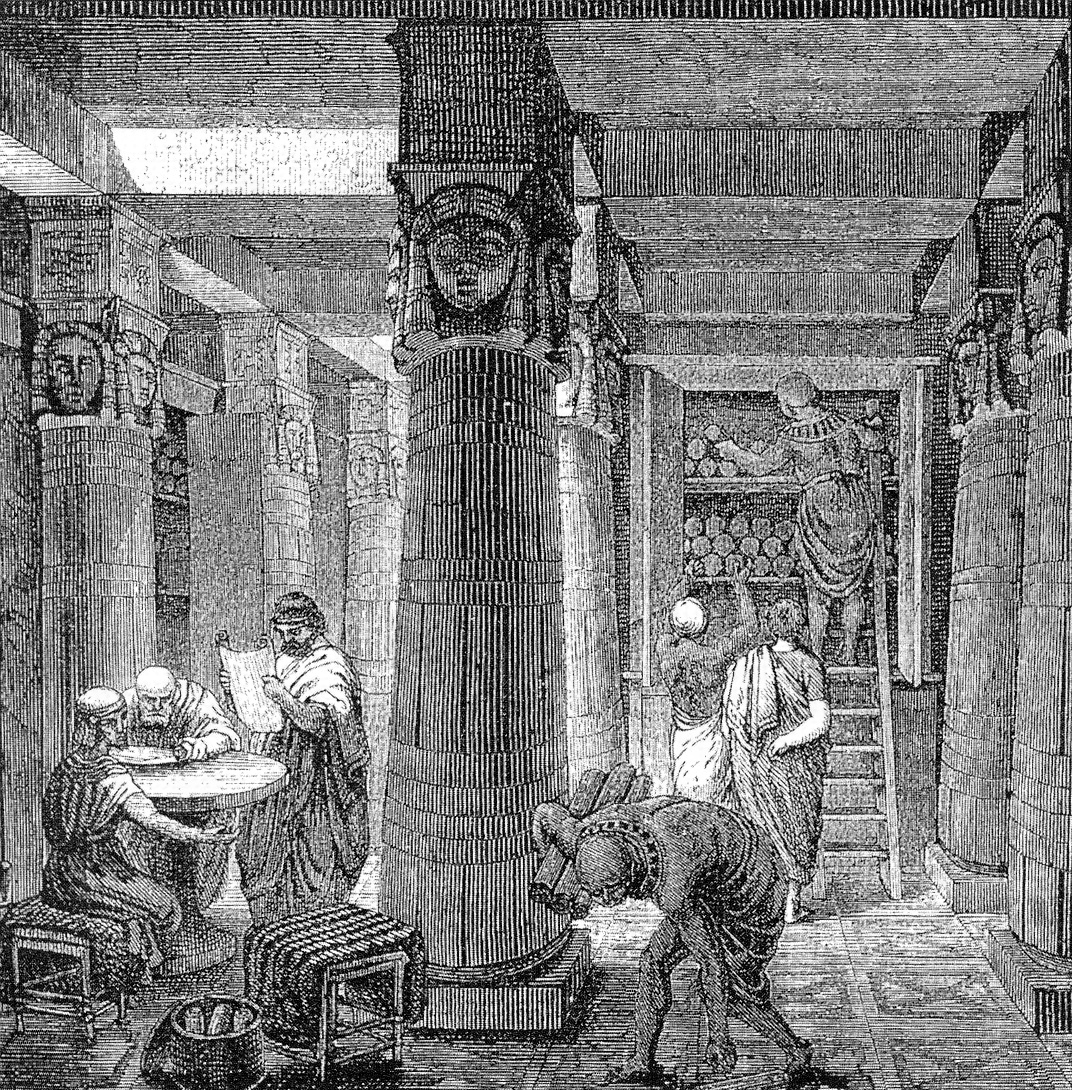
The Ancient Library of Alexandria

ψυχῆς ἰατρεῖον

psukhês iatreîon
"hospital of the soul"
Refers to the Library of Alexandria, also known as the Great Library in Alexandria, Egypt, which was once the largest library in the world.
The phrase is used in reverse as ἰατρεῖον ψυχῆς as a motto for Carolina Rediviva, a university library in Uppsala, and is echoed in the motto of the American Philological Association, "ψυχῆς ἰατρὸς τὰ γράμματα" ("literature is the soul's physician"). The phrase "ΨΥΧΗΣ ΙΑΤΡΕΙΟΝ" is above the entrance door of the Abbey library of Saint Gall.

== Ωω ==
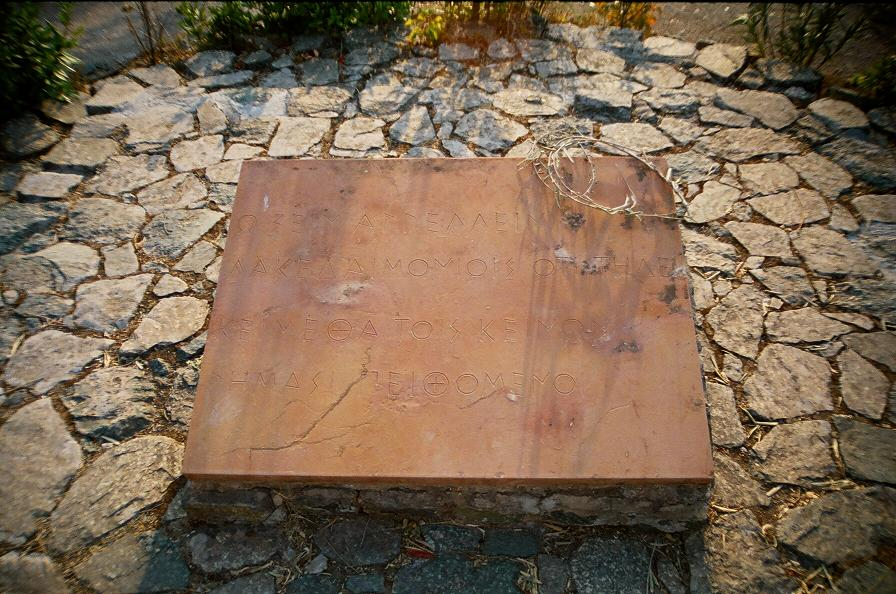
Epitaph at the Thermopylae

Ὦ ξεῖν’, ἀγγέλλειν Λακεδαιμονίοις ὅτι τῇδε / κείμεθα τοῖς κείνων ῥήμασι πειθόμενοι.
Ô xeîn’, angéllein Lakedaimoníois hóti têide / keímetha toîs keínōn rhḗmasi peithómenoi.
"Stranger, tell the Spartans that here we lie, obedient to their laws."
Epitaph, a single elegiac couplet by Simonides on the dead of Thermopylae.
Translated by Cicero in his Tusculan Disputations (1.42.101) as «Dic, hospes, Spartae nos te hic vidisse iacentis / dum sanctis patriae legibus obsequimur» (often quoted with the form iacentes).

== See also ==
- Delphic maxims – Set of maxims inscribed on the Temple of Apollo at Delphi
- English words of Greek origin
- Epithets in Homer – Characteristic of the poetic style of Homer
- Greek language – Indo-European language
- List of Latin phrases
