= Laws of work =

Laws of work may refer to:

- Laws of thermodynamics in physics
- Labour law, mediating the relationship between workers, employing entities, trade unions, and the government

== See also ==
- Work (disambiguation)
- Law (disambiguation)
