= Andrew Law =

Andrew Law may refer to:

- Andrew Bonar Law (1858–1923), British prime minister, from 1922
- Andrew Law (financier) (born 1966), British hedge fund executive
- Andrew Law (composer) (1749–1821), American composer and preacher
- Andrew Law (artist) (1873–1967), Scottish artist
- Michael Andrew Law (born 1982), Hong Kong artist
- Andrew Law (actor) (born 1986), American television writer

== See also ==
- Law (surname)
- Law (disambiguation)
