= Edward E. Lawler =

American academic (born 1938)

Edward E. Lawler III (born 1938) is an American academic and researcher specializing in human resources management, organizational development, and compensation theory. He is a professor emeritus at the University of Southern California (USC) Marshall School of Business. In 1979, Lawler founded the USC Center for Effective Organizations (CEO), a research center that has been recognized by publications such as Fortune and BusinessWeek for its contributions to management studies.

== Research and contributions ==
Lawler has collaborated with Fortune 500 companies, government agencies, and non-profit organizations. He has been described by BusinessWeek as one of the leading experts in management. In addition, Workforce magazine named him among the top 25 visionaries who have influenced modern workplace practices over the past century.

== Professional recognition ==
Throughout his career, Lawler has received numerous awards for his contributions to management and human resources research. He has been recognized by organizations including the Society for Human Resource Management (SHRM), the Society for Industrial and Organizational Psychology (SIOP), and the Academy of Management. He was the inaugural recipient of SHRM's Michael R. Losey Award. Lawler has appeared on national television and regularly delivers keynote addresses at international conferences. He was also featured in an interview conducted by Karl Moore.

== Publications ==
Lawler has authored or co-authored more than 450 articles and 52 books on management and organizational behavior. Selected works include:

- Lawler, Edward E. (2000). Rewarding Excellence: Pay Strategies for the New Economy (1st ed.). San Francisco, California: Jossey-Bass. ISBN 978-0-787-95074-3.
- Conger, Jay Alden; Lawler, Edward E.; Finegold, David (2001). Corporate Boards: Strategies for Adding Value at the Top (1st ed.). San Francisco, California: Jossey-Bass. ISBN 978-0-787-95620-2.
- Lawler, Edward E.; Mohrman, Susan Albers; Ledford, Gerald E.; Benson, George (July 30, 2001). Organizing for High Performance: Employee Involvement, TQM, Reengineering, and Knowledge Management in the Fortune 1000: The CEO Report (Revised and updated ed.). San Francisco, California: Jossey-Bass. ISBN 978-0-7879-5689-9.
- Lawler, Edward E. (April 2003). Treat People Right!: How Organizations and Individuals Can Propel Each Other into a Virtuous Spiral of Success. Jossey-Bass. ISBN 978-0-787-96478-8.
- Lawler, Edward E.; Ulrich, Dave; Fitz-enz, Jac; Madden, James (2004). Human Resources Business Process Outsourcing: Transforming How HR Gets Its Work Done (1st ed.). San Francisco, California: Jossey-Bass. ISBN 978-0-787-97163-2.
- O'Toole, James; Lawler, Edward E. (2006). The New American Workplace (1st ed.). New York: Palgrave Macmillan. ISBN 1-4039-6959-0.
- Lawler, Edward E. (December 2006). Lawler, Edward E.; O'Toole, James (eds.). America at Work: Choices and Challenges. Palgrave Macmillan. doi:10.1057/9781403983596. ISBN 978-1-4039-8359-6.
- Lawler, Edward E.; Worley, Christopher G. (February 2011). Built to Change: How to Achieve Sustained Organizational Effectiveness. Jossey-Bass. ISBN 978-1-118-04691-3.
- Lawler, Edward E. (July 2012). Effective Human Resource Management. Stanford University Press. ISBN 978-0-8047-7687-5.
- Lawler, Edward E. (June 2015). Global Trends in Human Resource Management. Stanford University Press. ISBN 978-0-8047-9129-8.
- Lawler, Edward E. (2018). Human Resource Excellence: An Assessment of Strategies and Trends. Stanford, California: Stanford Business Books, an imprint of Stanford University Press. ISBN 978-1-5036-0558-9.

Additional publications and edited volumes are listed by publishers including Wiley and Berrett-Koehler.
