= Lillian B. Lawler =

American woman philologist

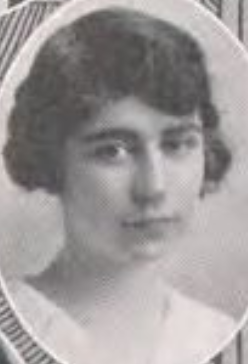
- Lillian B. Lawler, from the 1919 yearbook of the University of Pittsburgh
- Born: June 30, 1898; Pittsburgh, Pennsylvania
- Died: December 13, 1990 (aged 92); Coralville, Iowa
- Occupation(s): Classics scholar, college professor

Lillian B. Lawler (June 30, 1898 – December 13, 1990) was an American philologist and college professor. She taught Greek, Latin, and archaeology courses at Hunter College for thirty years, from 1929 to 1959, and published two books on dance in Ancient Greece.

== Early life and education ==
Lawler was born in Pittsburgh, Pennsylvania, the daughter of Thomas Joseph Lawler and Ellen Nuttridge Lawler. Her father worked for Westinghouse. She earned a bachelor's degree in education from the University of Pittsburgh in 1919, a master's degree in Latin from the University of Iowa in 1921, and a Ph.D. in education, also from Iowa, with a doctoral dissertation titled "The Potential Remediability of Errors in English Spelling through the Study of High School Latin" (1925).

== Career ==
Lawler taught at the University of Iowa during her graduate studies in the 1920s. From 1926 to 1929, she taught at the University of Kansas. She taught Greek, Latin, and archaeology classes at Hunter College from 1929 to 1959, and was recognized as an expert on dance in the literature and iconography of Ancient Greece.

Lawler edited the study aid Auxilium Latinum from 1931 to 1968, and was editor-in-chief of The Classical Outlook from 1936 to 1957. From 1946 to 1949, she was president of the Classical Association of the Atlantic States. From 1957 to 1964, she was vice-president of the American Classical League.

== Publications ==
Lawler's scholarly papers appeared in academic journals including The Classical Journal, Philological Quarterly, and Transactions and Proceedings of the American Philological Association. Her 1964 book The Dance in Ancient Greece was well-reviewed in The Daily Telegraph, where critic A. V. Coton wrote that "Miss Lawler's history effortlessly presents a persuasive account of how and why the Greeks used dancing."

- "Consilium Malum" (1920, a playlet)
- "Cordelia, a Play for the Junior High School" (1924)
- Latin Playlets for High Schools (1925)
- "The Maenads: A Contribution to the Study of the Dance in Ancient Greece" (1927)
- "The Easter Dances at Megara" (1927)
- Easy Latin Plays (1929)
- "Two Portraits from Tertullian" (1929)
- The Latin Club (1929)
- "The Dance of the Owl and Its Significance in the History of Greek Religion and the Drama" (1939)
- Adventures in Language (1941, with Rollin Harvelle Tanner and Mary L. Riley)
- "Four Dancers In The Birds of Aristophanes" (1942)
- "The Dance of the Holy Birds" (1942)
- "The Dance of the Ancient Mariners" (1944)
- "'The Lily' in the Dance" (1944)
- "The 'Thracian Pig Dance'" (1945, with Alice E. Kober}
- "Portrait of a Dancer" (1946)
- "The Geranos Dance: A New Interpretation" (1946)
- "A Dancer's Trophy" (1947)
- "Orchêsis Kallinikos" (1948)
- "On Certain Homeric Epithets" (1948)
- "'Limewood' Cinesias and the Dithyrambic Dance" (1950)
- "Krêtikôs in the Greek Dance" (1951)
- "The Dance in Metaphor" (1951)
- "Dancing Herds of Animals" (1952)
- "Bee Dances and the 'Sacred Bees'" (1954)
- "Phora, Schêma, Deixis in the Greek Dance" (1954)
- The Dance in Ancient Greece (1964)
- The Dance of the Ancient Greek Theatre (1964)

== Personal life and legacy ==
Lawler died in a nursing home in Coralville, Iowa, in 1990, at the age of 92. The University of Pittsburgh awards a Lillian B. Lawler Fellowship to graduate students.
