= Arthur Law =

Arthur Law may refer to:

- Arthur Law (playwright) (1844–1913), English playwright, actor and scenic designer
- Arthur Law (field hockey), Welsh field hockey player
- Arthur Law (politician), British Member of Parliament for Rossendale
- Arthur Law (rugby union) (1904–1961), New Zealand rugby union player
