= Peter Lawler =

Peter Lawler or Lawlor may refer to:

- Peter Lawler (academic) (1951–2017), professor of political philosophy and American politics
- Peter Lawler (canoeist) (born 1941), British sprint canoer
- Peter Lawler (public servant) (1921–2017), Australian public servant and diplomat
- Peter Lawlor (born 1948), Australian politician
- Peter Lawlor (hurler), Irish hurler
- Peter Lawlor (cricketer) (born 1960), Welsh cricketer
