= Benjamin Law =

Benjamin Law may refer to:

- Benjamin Law (inventor) (1773–?), inventor of the shoddy process
- Benjamin Law (artist) (1807–1882), 19th-century sculptor
- Benjamin Law (writer) (born 1982), Australian author and journalist

== See also ==
- Law (surname)
