= Workforce.com =

- Company type: Private
- Founded: 2012; 14 years ago
- Headquarters: Chicago
- Products: Human resource management system

Workforce.com is a software company that provides payroll, human resources, and workforce management tools for hourly teams. The company serves industries such as retail, healthcare, and hospitality. The company is headquartered in Chicago, US, and has offices in the United Kingdom, Australia and Southeast Asia.

== History ==
Founders Josh Cameron, Jake Phillpot, Tasmin Trezise, and Alex Ghiculescu established the software company in 2012 to help manage hourly employees while running a college bar. Without external funding, they established Tanda in Australia. The company started going global because of their live wage tracker and compliance engine.

In 2019, it expanded in North America by acquiring the Workforce company, an HR journal and publication. The company merged news and media with a workforce management platform now called Workforce.com.

The intellectual roots of Workforce.com date back to the efforts to apply scientific research to workforce management. In 1920, James R. Angell, then president of Yale University, delivered a speech at a Washington D.C. conference that contributed to the formation of the Personnel Research Federation. The movement laid the groundwork for applying data and behavioral science to labor issues, an approach that continues in Workforce.com's use of modern technologies like artificial intelligence and automation in workforce operations.

== Workforce Magazine ==
Workforce.com previously published Workforce Magazine, a print and digital publication focused on human resources topics. The magazine was in circulation until 2020.

In 1991, Workforce Magazine established the Optimas Awards to recognize excellence in human resources and workforce management initiatives that drive business results. The awards are presented in several categories, including Financial Impact, Global Outlook, Innovation, Managing Change, Partnership, Corporate Citizenship, Service, Vision, Competitive Advantage, and General Excellence.

In 2011, Workforce Magazine launched the Game Changers Awards, an initiative recognizing HR professionals who demonstrated innovation and significant contributions to the field. The awards program continued until 2019.

In 2014, Workforce Magazine launched the Workforce 100, which is a list of companies that excel in human resources management.

== Products and Services ==
- Employee scheduling - shift scheduling software with AI demand forecasting
- Human resources - employee onboarding, HRIS, performance management, and applicant tracking
- Time and attendance - digital time clocks, mobile clock-ins with GPS tracking, and automated timesheets
- Payroll - automated payroll processing with built-in tax compliance
- Compliance - overtime tracking, Fair Workweek compliance, and labor law updates

According to a Forrester study, businesses using the platform have reported a 5% increase in labor efficiency, a 80% reduction in time spent on employee scheduling, and a 20% decrease in compliance risks.

Workforce.com also partners with other industry software vendors, including point-of-sale (POS), to expand functionality. Currently, it has a 4.2 rating on Gartner.
