= Law (disambiguation) =

Law is a system of rules that regulate behavior.

Law, the law, LAW, laws or similar variants may also refer to:

== Other common meanings ==
- Law (principle), universal principles that describe the fundamental nature of something
- Law enforcement, sometimes referred to as "the law" or "lawmen"
  - Law or The Law, one of a list of slang terms for police officers
- Statutory law, a written law created by one or more legislators

== Places ==
- Law, Dundee, an extinct volcanic peak at the centre of the Scottish city of Dundee
- The Law, Ochil Hills, a hill within the Ochil Hills in Scotland
- Law, South Lanarkshire, small town in Scotland
- Laws, California, United States, an unincorporated community
- "The Law", nickname of Dan Law Field, home of the Texas Tech Red Raiders baseball team

== People ==
- Law (surname)
- Laws (surname)
- Luo (surname) (羅), a Chinese surname commonly transliterated Law

== Arts, entertainment, and media ==
=== Books ===
- The Law (Bastiat book), an 1850 book by Frédéric Bastiat
- The Law (novel), a 1957 novel by Roger Vailland

=== Fictional characters ===
- Law & Order (G.I. Joe), fictional characters from the G.I. Joe: A Real American Hero franchise
- Law (comics), a supervillain
- Marshall and Forest Law, two characters from the Tekken video game series
- Trafalgar D. Water Law, a character from the anime and manga One Piece
- Lawrence Pemberton (known as "The Law"), a character in an American web series Video Game High School

=== Film and television ===
- The Law (1943 film), an Indian film by Abdur Rashid Kardar
- The Law (1959 film), with Gina Lollobrigida (original title: La Legge)
- The Law (1974 film), television film with Judd Hirsch
  - The Law (TV series), 1975 television miniseries
- The Law (1990 film), an award-winning Burkinabé drama film also known as Tilaï
- The Law (2002 film), a British television film
- "The Law" (The Amazing World of Gumball), a television episode
- Law (film), a 2020 Indian Kannada film

=== Music ===
==== Bands ====
- Law (band), a 1970s funk/rock band from Ohio
- The Law (English band), an English rock group
- The Law (Scottish band), an indie rock band from Scotland

==== Albums ====
- The Law (Exhorder album)
- The Law (The Law album)

==== Songs ====
- "Law" (song), by Yo Gotti featuring E-40 from his album The Art of Hustle
- "Law", a song by David Bowie from his album Earthling
- "The Law", a song by Ab-Soul on the album Do What Thou Wilt.
- "The Law", a song by Editors from In Dream
- "The Law", a song by King Adora
- "The Law", a song by Leonard Cohen on the album Various Positions
- "The Law", a song by Uriah Heep on the album Outsider

=== Other arts, entertainment, and media ===
- L.A.W. (comics), a limited series comic book published by DC comics
- Live Audio Wrestling, a Canadian sports radio talk show that primarily covers professional wrestling and mixed martial arts
- Law, one axis of the alignment system used in the role-playing game Dungeons & Dragons

== Weapons ==
- Light anti-tank weapon, commonly abbreviated to "LAW"
  - LAW 80, a British light anti-tank weapon
  - M72 LAW, an American light anti-tank weapon
  - NLAW, a Swedish light anti-tank weapon
- Laser Weapon System or LaWS, a United States naval laser weapon
- Lethal autonomous weapons system or LAWS, autonomous robots designed for military applications

== Groups, organizations, companies ==
- Laredo Law, a defunct 2004 af2 arena football team in Laredo, Texas
- League of American Bicyclists, formerly known as the League of American Wheelmen
- League of American Writers
- Loyalist Association of Workers, militant unionist organization for trade union members in Northern Ireland
- Palestinian Society for the Protection of Human Rights (also known as LAW)

== Science and mathematics ==
- Laws of science, established principles thought to be universal and invariable
- Law (stochastic processes), a specific form of law in the stochastic processes subfield of mathematics
- Law of mathematics

== Transportation and vehicles ==
- LAW, IATA airport code and FAA location ID for Lawton–Fort Sill Regional Airport, Comanche County, Oklahoma, United States
- LAW, station code for Landywood railway station, England
- USS Laws (DD-558), a destroyer which served in World War II
- Light Amphibious Warship (LAW) or Landing Ship Medium (LSM) (U.S. Navy)

== Other uses ==
- Laws (dialogue), a dialogue by Plato
- Flight control law, a flight computer mode in a fly-by-wire aircraft.
- Torah in Jewish culture is also known as "The Law"

== See also ==
- Law enforcement agency
