= Kakodaimonistai =

The Kakodaimonistai (ancient Greek κακοδαιμονισταί, singular κακοδαιμονιστής, worshippers of the evil daemon) were a dining club in ancient Athens that consisted of the poet Kinesias and his companions Apollophanes, Mystallides, and Lysitheus. They are attested in a speech by Lysias criticizing Kinesias. They chose the name to ridicule the gods and Athenian custom. One of the ways in which they did this was by dining on unlucky days (ἡμέραι ἀποφράδες), holidays set apart for fasting, in order to test the gods. All of the kakodaimonistai except Kinesias died young, possibly due to excessive consumption of alcohol.

The name Kakodaimonistai, which has been translated as "devil-worshippers" or "the bad luck club", was a parody of the name Agathodaimonistai used by some respectable social clubs. Such monthly banqueting fraternities were common at the time.
