= Laws (surname) =

Laws is a surname. Notable people with the surname include:

- Annie Laws (1855–1927), American educator, clubwoman
- Bolitha James Laws (1891–1958), United States federal judge
- Brian Laws, (born 1961) English football manager and former player
- David Laws (born 1965), British politician
- David Laws (rugby league), rugby union and rugby league footballer of the 1980s in Great Britain
- Don Laws (1929–2014), American figure skater and coach
- Eloise Laws (born 1943), American jazz and R&B singer
- George Malcolm Laws (1919–1994), American folklorist
- Gilbert L. Laws (1838–1907), American politician, newspaper publisher and businessman
- John Laws (1935–2025), Australian radio presenter
- John Laws (judge) (1945–2020), British retired judge
- Johnny Laws (1943–2021), American Chicago blues guitarist, singer and songwriter
- Maury Laws (1923–2019), American television and film score composer
- Michael Laws (born 1957), New Zealand politician, broadcaster, writer and columnist
- Priscilla Laws (1940–2023), American physicist
- Richard Laws (1926–2014), British marine biologist, Master of St Edmund's College, Cambridge
- Robert Laws (1851–1934), Scottish missionary in the Nyasaland Protectorate (now Malawi)
- Robert E. Laws (1921–1990), American World War II soldier awarded the Medal of Honor
- Sharon Laws (1974–2017), British cyclist and environmental consultant
- Stephen Laws, British lawyer and civil servant, First Parliamentary Counsel (2006–2012)

== See also ==
- Law (surname)
