= Dennis Law (disambiguation) =

Dennis Law (born 1963) is a Hong Kong film producer, screenwriter, actor, director and presenter.

Dennis Law or Denis Law may also refer to:

- Denis Law (1940–2025), Scottish footballer
- Dennis Law (American football) (born 1955), American football player
