= Nicky Law =

Nicky Law may refer to:

- Nicky Law (footballer, born 1961)
- Nicky Law (footballer, born 1988)
