= William Law (disambiguation) =

William Law (1686–1761) was an English divine and theological writer.

William Law may also refer to:

- William Law (Lord Provost) (1799-1878) Lord Provost of Edinburgh
- William Law (Latter Day Saints) (1809–1892), Irish-born American leader and apostate in the Latter Day Saint movement
- William Law (cricketer) (1851–1892), English amateur cricketer
- William D. Law, President of Tallahassee Community College, Florida
- William Henry Law (1803–1881), Connecticut state legislator
- William Law (Canadian politician) (1833–1901), merchant and political figure in Nova Scotia, Canada
- William John Law (1786–1869), British judge
- William A. Law, former director of Chatham and Phenix National Bank
- Bill Law, English drummer, formerly of My Dying Bride
- William A. H. "Bill" Law (1913-2004), Ottawa controller and alderman
- Arthur Law (playwright) (William Arthur Law, 1844–1913), English playwright
- Bill Law (diver) (1934–2009), Scottish diver
