= Alice Law =

New Zealand music teacher for the blind (1870–1942)

Alice Law

Alice Easton Law (23 October 1870 – 28 August 1942) was a New Zealand music teacher for the visually impaired at the Jubilee Institute for the Blind who was involved in fundraising for the Institute and ensured that her female students gained the same resources and support as male students.

== Early life ==
Law was born in Burntisland, Fife, Scotland on 23 October 1870, to Catharine Morton and her husband William Law, a commercial traveller. Her sister Mary Blythe Law was born in 1873. In the early 1880s Law moved to New Zealand with her mother and sister. Law assisted her mother who ran a ladies' seminary in Remuera.

Law studied piano under Professor Carl Gustav Schmitt, and violin under Herr Von Zimmerman, and became a music teacher herself. She won the Amateur Opera Club's scholarship in harmony. She went to England to continue her studies, and became a licentiate of the Royal Academy of Music, London. She returned to New Zealand to teach.

== Career ==
Law was a music teacher in Auckland and Devonport.

In 1902 Law gained a part-time position working as a music teacher at the Jubilee Institute for the Blind, where her sister already worked. The Institute was the first organisation in New Zealand to provide education services for the visually impaired, and included residential care, education, and skills training, to enable blind people to increase their independence. Law taught the piano and used braille to help her students study and pass their examinations, producing several high-quality musicians.

Musical performances played a crucial part in raising funds for the Institute, particularly during the depression. The existing Institute band was all-male, and Law was instrumental in forming a corresponding girls orchestra, which performed regularly between 1929 and 1939. Law at times had to intervene at the Institute to ensure that female students received a decent share of resources.

Law was an early member of the Auckland Society of Musicians.

Law never married, and continued working at the Institute until she died in Auckland on 28 August 1942.
