= Alfred Law (cricketer) =

English cricketer (1862–1919)

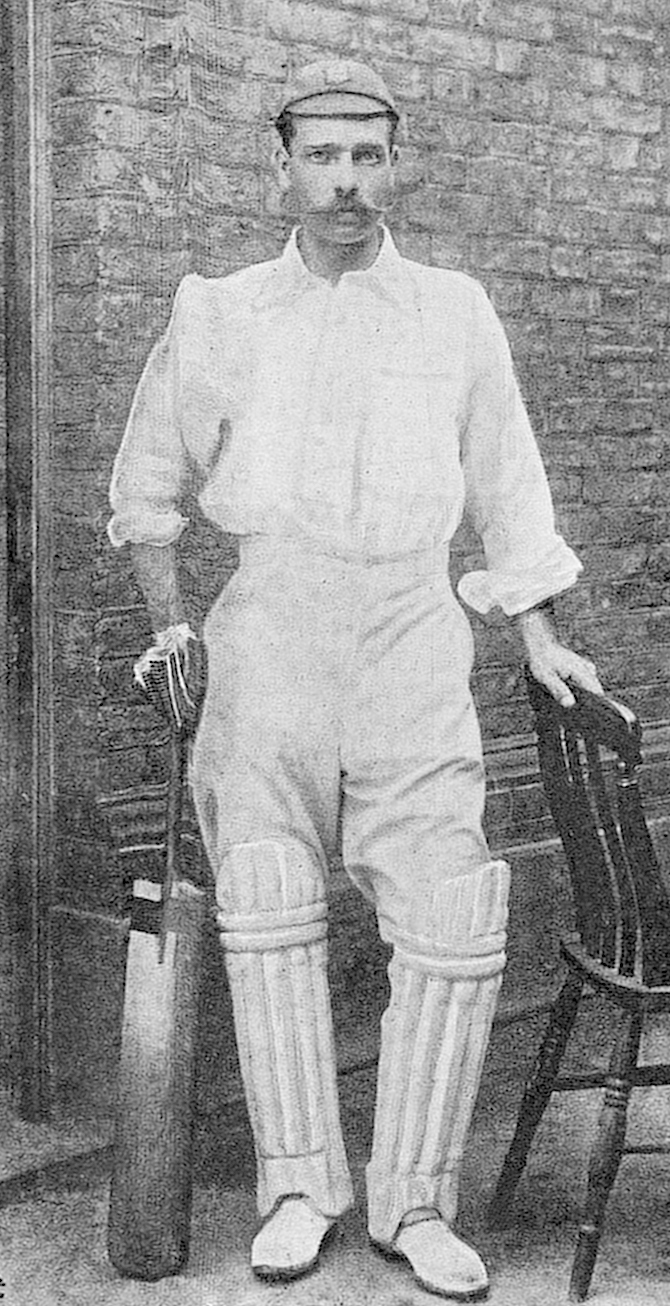

Personal information
- Born: 18 December 1862; Birmingham, Warwickshire, England
- Died: 19 May 1919 (aged 56); Handsworth, Warwickshire, England
- Batting: right-handed
- Role: batsman

Domestic team information
- Years: Team
- 1894–1899: Warwickshire

Career statistics
Competition	First-class
Matches	52
Runs scored	1,459
Batting average	19.19
100s/50s	0/9
Top score	89
Catches/stumpings	21/0
- Source: CricketArchive, 5 November 2012

Alfred Law (18 December 1862 – 19 May 1919) was an English cricketer who played for Warwickshire between 1894 and 1899, and was an umpire in 1908. He was born in Birmingham.

== Cricket career ==
Law made his first-class debut in a County Championship match for Warwickshire against Nottinghamshire in May 1894. His top score of 89 was made in May 1895 for his county versus Yorkshire.

After his playing career had ended, Law umpired in 19 first-class matches in 1908. He died in Handsworth, aged 56.
