= Richard Law =

Richard Law may refer to:

- Richard Law (judge) (1733–1806), American judge
- Richard Law, 1st Baron Coleraine (1901–1980), British politician
- Richard Law, 8th Baron Ellenborough (1926–2013), member of the House of Lords
- Rick Law (born 1969), illustrator
