= Thomas Law (disambiguation) =

Thomas Law (born 1992) is an English actor.

Thomas Law may also refer to:

- Thomas Law (1756–1834), British administrator with the East India Company
- Thomas Graves Law (1836–1904), English Oratorian priest and historian
- Thomas Law (c. 1850–died 1878), Australian bushranger known by the alias Midnight
- T. S. Law (Thomas Sturdy Law), Scottish poet
