= Lawyer (name) =

Lawyer is a surname and a masculine given name that comes from the job Lawyer, and may refer to:

== First name ==
- Lawyer Milloy (born 1973), American football player
- Lawyer Tillman (born 1966), American football player
- Hallalhotsoot or "Lawyer" (c. 1797–1876), a leader of the Niimíipu (Nez Perce) Native American tribe

== Surname ==
- Abraham L. Lawyer (1792–1853), New York politician
- Thomas Lawyer (1785–1868), US Congressman from New York

== See also ==
- Tracye Lawyer-Thomas (born 1977), American heptathlete
