= Cinesias (poet) =

Athenian dithyrambic poet (c. 450–390 BC)

Cinesias (Greek: Κινησίας; c. 450 – 390 BC) was an innovative dithyrambic poet (an exponent of the "new music") in classical Athens whose work has survived only in a few fragments. An inscription indicates that he was awarded a victory at the Dionysia in the early 4th century (IG 2/3^{2}.3028). His contemporary, the comic poet Aristophanes, ridiculed him in his play The Birds, in which Cinesias attempts to borrow wings from the birds as an aid to poetic inspiration. Aristophanes refers to him also in The Frogs (lines 153, 1437), Ecclesiazusae (line 330), Lysistrata (line 860), and in a fragmentary verse (fragment 156. 10 K-A). Another comic poet, Strattis, wrote an entire play against Cinesias, of which only fragments survive (fragments 14–22 K-A), and he was considered by Pherecrates to have had a corrupting influence on dithyrambic poetry (fragment 155. 8ff. K-A). Lysias accused Cinesias of being in a group called the Kakodaimonistai to mock the gods.
