= Royal Queen's County Rifle Militia =

Auxiliary unit of the British Army

Queen's County Militia Royal Queen's County Rifle Militia 4th (Extra Reserve) Bn, Prince of Wales's Leinster Regiment (Royal Canadians)
- Active: 1793–1922
- Country: Ireland (1793–1800); United Kingdom (1801–1922)
- Branch: Militia/Special Reserve
- Role: Infantry
- Size: 1 Battalion
- Part of: Prince of Wales's Leinster Regiment (Royal Canadians)
- Garrison/HQ: Mountrath; Maryborough
- Engagements: Irish Rebellion of 1798

Commanders
- Notable commanders: Col Sir Anthony Weldon, 6th Baronet, CVO, DSO

The Royal Queen's County Rifle Militia was an Irish Militia regiment in Queen's County (now County Laois) (Note: Not to be confused with the Queens County Militia of New Brunswick, Canada, or of New York State) raised in 1793. It later became a battalion of the Prince of Wales's Leinster Regiment (Royal Canadians). It saw action during the Irish Rebellion of 1798 and trained hundreds of reinforcements during World War I. It was disbanded in 1922.

== Background ==
Although there are scattered references to town guards in 1584, no organised militia existed in Ireland before 1660. After that date, some militia forces were organised in the reign of King Charles II but it was not until 1715 that the Irish Militia came under statutory authority. During the 18th Century there were various Volunteer Associations and unofficial militia units controlled by the landowners, concerned mainly with internal security. During the War of American Independence, the threat of invasion by the Americans' allies, France and Spain, appeared to be serious. While most of the Regular Army was fighting overseas, the coasts of England and Wales were defended by the embodied Militia, but Ireland had no equivalent force. The Parliament of Ireland passed a Militia Act, but this failed to create an effective force. However it opened the way for the paramilitary Irish Volunteers to fill the gap. The Volunteers were outside the control of either the parliament or the Dublin Castle administration. When the invasion threat receded they diminished in numbers but remained a political force. On the outbreak of the French Revolutionary War In 1793, the Irish administration passed an effective Militia Act that created an official Irish Militia, while the paramilitary volunteers were essentially banned. The new Act was based on existing English precedents, with the men conscripted by ballot to fill county quotas (paid substitutes were permitted) and the officers having to meet certain property qualifications.

== Queen's County Militia ==
Queen's County was given a quota of 356 men to find, in six companies, and the Queen's County Militia was quickly formed at Mountrath, John Dawson, 1st Earl of Portarlington being appointed its Colonel on 23 April 1793. When the regiment left for its first station at Monaghan in December 1793, a writer who had expected an 'irregular, half-appointed and undisciplined rabble' was favourably impressed with the regiment, finding it 'by no means inferior (in appearance) to that of any veteran regulars which I have ever met with'. He was particularly complimentary about the flank (Grenadier and Light) companies, and commented that the regiment had discharged some men because it exceeded its establishment.

=== French Revolutionary War and Irish Rebellion ===
The French Revolutionary and Napoleonic Wars saw the British and Irish militia embodied for a whole generation, becoming regiments of full-time professional soldiers (though restricted to service in Britain or Ireland respectively), which the regular army increasingly saw as a prime source of recruits. They served in coast defences, manned garrisons, guarded prisoners of war, and carried out internal security duties. In August 1794 the Queen's County Militia was quartered with five companies at Coleraine and one at Magherafelt. In October 1796 the regiment was in camp at Blaris when it made the offer to Lord Portarlington to serve in any part of the world. The Irish Militia was augmented in 1795, Queen's County's quota being increased to 460 men.

Anxiety about a possible French invasion grew during the autumn of 1796 and preparations were made for field operations. A large French expeditionary force appeared in Bantry Bay on 21 December and troops from all over Ireland were marched towards the threatened area. However, the French fleet was scattered by winter storms, several ships being wrecked, and none of the French troops succeeded in landing; there was no sign of a rising by the United Irishmen. The invasion was called off on 29 December, and the troop concentration was dispersed in early 1797. At the same time the Light companies were detached to join composite battalions drawn from several militia regiments; the Queen's County company joined the 4th Light Battalion. When the militiamen of 1793 reached the end of their four-year enlistment in 1797, most of the Irish regiments were able to maintain their numbers through re-enlistments (for a bounty). At the time of the Irish Rebellion of 1798 the strength of the militia was boosted by further re-enlistments and recruiting for bounty rather than the ballot.

The Queen's's County regiment was employed in the west of Ireland during the Rebellion but the Light Company took part in the Battle of New Ross on 5 June with 4th Light Battalion.

The Earl of Portarlington died on 30 November 1798 and Charles Coote (later Lord Castle Coote) took over as colonel from 22 January 1799, with Stewart Weldon as his Lieutenant-Colonel.

Legislation had been rushed through the British Parliament to permit British militia regiments to volunteer for service in suppressing the Irish rebellion. In return a number of Irish militia regiments offered to serve on the mainland, adopting a blue cockade as a badge to denote their willingness. In April 1799 the Queen's County regiment offered their service again, stating that 'both officers and men have wanted the blue cockade'. However, although these offers were supported by the Lord Lieutenant and Commander-in-Chief of Ireland, Marquess Cornwallis, they were unwelcome to some of the authorities in England, from the King downwards, and no Irish Militia unit served on the British mainland at this time.

With the diminishing threat of invasion after 1799, the strength of the militia could be reduced, and the surplus men were encouraged to volunteer for regiments of the line. By the end of 1801 peace negotiations with the French were progressing and recruiting and re-enlistment for the Irish Militia was stopped in October. The men received the new clothing they were due on 25 December, but the Treaty of Amiens was signed in March 1802 when the regiment was disembodied. The men were paid off, leaving only the permanent staff of non-commissioned officers (NCOs) and drummers under the regimental adjutant.

=== Napoleonic Wars ===
The Peace of Amiens was short-lived, and preparations to re-embody the Irish Militia began in November 1802. By March 1803 most of the regiments had been ordered to enlist men, a process which was aided by the number of previous militiamen who re-enlisted. Britain declared war on France on 18 May 1803 and the warrant to embody the Irish Militia was issued the next day. The light companies were once again detached to form composite light battalions, but these were discontinued in 1806.

Over the following years the regiments carried out garrison duties at various towns across Ireland, attended summer training camps (the Queen's County was at Killeady Hill near Cork in the summer of 1804), and reacted to various invasion scares, none of which materialised. They also provided volunteers to transfer to the Regular Army. In 1805 the militia establishment was raised to allow for this.

Colonel Lord Castle Coote's son the Hon Charles Henry Coote was appointed Lieutenant-Colonel dated 11 April 1805 but died in 1810.

An 'Interchange Act' was passed in July 1811 permitting British and Irish militia units to volunteer for service across the Irish Sea. By the end of July 34 out of 38 Irish militia regiments had volunteered for this service, but only 15 travelled to England, the Queen's County not being among them.

Napoleon abdicated in April 1814. When news of the peace arrived, the Queen's County Militia was stationed at Clonmel. With the end of the war most Irish Militia regiments marched back to their home counties to be disembodied, the Queens' County regiment doing so in August. However, they were called out again during the brief Waterloo campaign and its aftermath. The Queen's County regiment was re-embodied in May 1815 and by October was stationed at Naas. The order to stand down finally arrived early in 1816 and the Queen's County Militia was accordingly disembodied on 23 March.

=== Long Peace ===
After Waterloo there was a long peace. Although officers continued to be commissioned into the militia and ballots might still held, the regiments were rarely assembled for training and the permanent staffs of militia regiments were progressively reduced.

Lord Castle Coote died in 1823 and Sir Charles Coote, 9th Baronet, became Colonel in 1825. Francis Plunkett Dunne, Member of Parliament (MP) for Portarlington, a half-pay major, formerly in the 10th Foot, became Lt-Col on 15 February 1846.

== 1852 Reforms ==
The Militia of the United Kingdom was revived by the Militia Act 1852, enacted during a renewed period of international tension. As before, units were raised and administered on a county basis, and filled by voluntary enlistment (although conscription by means of the Militia Ballot might be used if the counties failed to meet their quotas). Training was for 56 days on enlistment, then for 21–28 days per year, during which the men received full army pay. Under the Act, Militia units could be embodied by Royal Proclamation for full-time home defence service in three circumstances:

1. 'Whenever a state of war exists between Her Majesty and any foreign power'.
2. 'In all cases of invasion or upon imminent danger thereof'.
3. 'In all cases of rebellion or insurrection'.

The militia regiment in Queen's County was revived as the Royal Queen's County Rifle Militia, now based at Maryborough instead of Mountrath. Sir Charles Coote and Colonel (later Major-General) Francis Dunne remained as colonel and lieutenant-colonel respectively, but a large number of new officers were commissioned. The position of colonel in the militia disappeared after the 1852 Act, the lieutenant-colonel generally being the commanding officer (CO) and the position of honorary colonel was created.

=== Crimean War and after ===
The Crimean War broke out in 1854 and after a large expeditionary force was sent overseas, the militia began to be called out. The Queen's County Rifles was embodied at Maryborough on 14 December 1854. It moved to Mountmellick during November 1855 and remained there for the rest of its embodiment. It was stood down on 4 August 1856 and was not re-embodied during the Indian Mutiny.

The reformed militia settled into a routine of annual training, although the Queen's County regiment did not carry out its first until 1861, and training was suspended for the Irish Militia from 1866 to 1870 because of Fenian troubles. The regiments now had a large cadre of permanent staff (about 30) and a number of the officers were former Regulars. Around a third of the recruits and many young officers went on to join the Regular Army. The Militia Reserve introduced in 1867 consisted of present and former militiamen who undertook to serve overseas in case of war. They were called out in 1878 during the international crisis caused by the Russo-Turkish War.

== Cardwell and Childers Reforms ==
Under the 'Localisation of the Forces' scheme introduced by the Cardwell Reforms of 1872, militia regiments were brigaded with their local linked regular regiments. For the Queen's County Rifles this was in Sub-District No 67 (Counties of Meath, Westmeath and Longford, and King's and Queen's Counties) in Dublin District of Irish Command:

- 100th (Prince of Wales's Royal Canadian) Regiment of Foot
- 109th (Bombay Infantry) Regiment of Foot
- Royal Longford Rifles
- King's County Rifles
- Queen's County Rifles
- Westmeath Rifles
- Royal Meath Militia
- No 67 Brigade Depot – formed in April 1873 at Birr, the King's County Militia's headquarters.

Although often referred to as brigades, the sub-districts were purely administrative organisations, but in a continuation of the Cardwell Reforms a mobilisation scheme began to appear in the Army List from December 1875. This assigned regular and militia units to places in an order of battle of for the 'Active Army' or the 'Garrison Army', even though these formations were entirely theoretical, with no staff or services assigned. The Queen's County Militia was assigned to the Garrison Army manning a range of small forts and posts across Ireland.

The Queen's County and the North Cork Militia trained together in 1873, leading to a long-running feud between the two regiments. It began in the canteen one night when a Queen's County rifleman loudly asked 'Who killed Father Murphy? The North Cork Militia by jabers!'. Father Murphy was a prominent figure during the 1798 rebellion but the reference to the North Corks is obscure. The ill-feeling between the two regiments was so great that as late as 1900 when they were both on Salisbury Plain it was considered inadvisable to quarter them together. From 1878 the Queen's County regiment normally did its annual training on the Great Heath at Maryborough.

=== 4th Battalion, Leinster Regiment ===
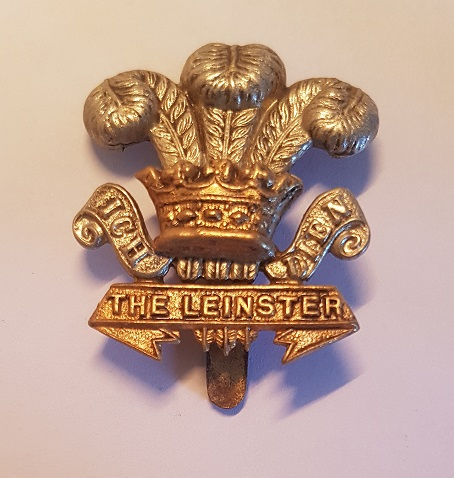
Prince of Wales's Leinster Regiment cap badge.

The Childers Reforms took Cardwell's reforms further, with the linked battalions forming single regiments. From 1 July 1881 the 100th and 109th Regiments became the 1st and 2nd Battalions of the Prince of Wales's Leinster Regiment (Royal Canadians), and three of the militia battalions followed in numerical sequence. The Queen's County Militia became the 4th (Queen's County Militia) Battalion, the King's County became the 3rd Bn and the Royal Meath the 5th Bn (the Longford Rifles and Westmeath joined the Rifle Brigade).

Bernard FitzPatrick, 2nd Baron Castletown became Lt-Col commanding the 4th Bn on 4 October 1899. A former lieutenant 1st Life Guards, he had served at the Battle of Tel-el-Kebir during the Anglo-Egyptian War of 1882.

=== Second Boer War ===
After the Second Boer War broke out in October 1899 an expeditionary force was sent to South Africa and the militia reserve was called out to reinforce it. Later the militia regiments began to be embodied to replace the regulars for home defence. The 4th Leinsters were embodied on 8 May 1900 and went to Salisbury Plain for training. They then moved to garrison Dover until they were disembodied on 6 July 1901. As well as the militia reservists, a number of officers from the battalion went to South Africa: Lt-Col Lord Castletown as an Acting Assistant Adjutant-General on the staff, being awarded a CMG, Maj A.A. Weldon (later Sir Anthony Weldon, 6th Baronet), was on the railway staff and present at the Relief of Ladysmith, being awarded the DSO, Capt Theodore Willington served in the latter stages of the war and Capt T.R.A. Stannus served with the 45th (Dublin Hunt) Company, Imperial Yeomanry.

== Special Reserve ==
After the Boer War, the future of the militia was called into question. There were moves to reform the Auxiliary Forces (Militia, Yeomanry and Volunteers) to take their place in the six Army Corps proposed by the Secretary of State for War, St John Brodrick. However, little of Brodrick's scheme was carried out. Under the more sweeping Haldane Reforms of 1908, the Militia was replaced by the Special Reserve (SR), a semi-professional force whose role was to provide reinforcement drafts for regular units serving overseas in wartime, rather like the earlier Militia Reserve. The battalion transferred to the SR as the 4th (Extra Reserve) Battalion of the Leinsters, while the 3rd (King's County Militia) and 5th (Royal Meath Militia) Bns became Reserve and Extra Reserve Bns respectively. The possibility was held out that Extra Reserve battalions might be sent overseas in the event of war.

=== World War I ===
In July 1914 the 4th (ER) Battalion carried out its annual training at Shanbally Camp at Monkstown, County Cork. The UK declared war on 4 August 1914 and next day 4th (ER) Battalion was embodied and mobilised at Maryborough, going by train next day back to its war station at Shanbally Camp with a strength of 12 officers and 496 ORs. There it was brigaded with the 3rd (R) and 5th (ER) Bns of the Leinsters and other SR battalions as 'Shanbally Sub-Command' under Lt-Col Sir Anthony Weldon, the CO of 4th Bn. Major Theobald Willington took over temporary command of 4th Bn with the acting rank of Lt-Col.

At Shanbally the battalion occupied some trenches that had been hurriedly dug by a Regular battalion before it left to join the British Expeditionary Force (BEF). These protected the gun batteries on the western side of the entrance to Cork Harbour, and the battalion spent the following months digging fresh ones around Shanbally and Raffeen, as well as field training. The weather was poor, and the men's waterproof sheets had been taken for the new recruits of Kitchener's Army, who were flooding onto the depots and training battalions. On 8 October the Special Reserve battalions were ordered to form service battalions from their surplus recruits for Kitchener's 4th New Army, and 4th (Extra Reserve) Bn should have formed a 9th (Service) Battalion. However this order was cancelled for most Irish regiments and Extra Reserve battalions on 25 October and no 9th Leinsters was ever formed.

On 25 October 4th (ER) Bn despatched a draft of 70 men to reinforce 2nd Bn Leinsters with the BEF. On 31 October the Shanbally Sub-Command was closed down and the battalion was moved from its tented camp into the Old Granaries at Passage West. It spent two weeks of November at Charles Fort at Kinsale for musketry training and then returned to Passage, where it posted detachments on the west side of Cork Harbour at Ballybunion, Brow Head, Roberts Cove, Ringabelly Cove and Myrtleville Bay. On 20 December the battalion sent another draft of 35 ORs to 2nd Bn in France. The fact that 4th Bn had become a draft-finding unit upset the SR officers and men who had accepted the overseas service obligation on the basis that it would go overseas as a complete unit. Lieutenant-Col Weldon went to the War Office in London to press the matter, but the decision was not changed. The battalion complained that it was doing the same work of training recruits as the nearby 3rd (R) and 5th (ER) Bns, but by April 1915 its strength (36 officers but only 300 ORs) was too small to carry this out efficiently.

The 4th and 5th battalions were now ordered to England, leaving Passage West on 21 May and embarking at Queenstown aboard the RMS Connaught for Plymouth. On arrival the 4th was sent to Devonport where it was quartered in Withnoe Hutments at Millbrook. It formed part of 2nd Brigade of the Plymouth Garrison under Lt-Col Weldon. By the end of August 1915 4th Bn had sent 441 men to the Western Front where 1st and 2nd Bns were serving, and 30 to 6th Bn at Gallipoli. In September the battalion returned to Ireland, where it was accommodated in Gough Barracks at the Curragh.

In April 1916 4th Bn was moved from the Curragh to Limerick, where it took over the New Barracks on 13 April. The Easter Rising was about to break out, and Lt-Col Weldon was warned to form a 'striking force' to deal with the expected arrival of a gun-running vessel from Germany. From a strength of 49 officers, 87 non-commissioned officers, 384 ORs (of whom 324 were considered trained), 103 home service men and 134 recruits, the battalion had a 'fighting strength' of only 260. Weldon selected 6 officers and 114 ORs with a machine gun section as his striking force. In the event the German gun-running ship was captured offshore and the leader, Sir Roger Casement, was arrested soon after landing from a submarine. The risjng went ahead on Easter Sunday, 23 April, and within 20 minutes of receiving the news Weldon had 49 officers and 499 ORs turned out with 120 rounds of ammunition per man. Picquets were posted at the vital points in Limerick, but the town remained quiet. Reinforcements arrived on 26 April from 3rd Bn Leinsters and 4th Bn Royal Irish Regiment at Cork and Queenstown, and by nightfall on 27 April all the bridges across the River Shannon were strongly defended. Apart from a few shots fired by nervous sentries, there was no action in Limerick, and by 29 April the rising in Dublin had collapsed. Weldon persuaded the Irish Volunteers in County Limerick, who had not participated in the rising, to surrender their arms and ammunition to his men. 'Flying Columns' of the 4th Leinsters, 4th Royal Irish and 2/16th London Regiment (Queen's Westminsters) combed the countryside, and Maj Willington commanded a column drawn from the Young Officers Training Corps at Fermoy, which carried out some operations in County Wexford, but by mid-May everything was quiet. 4th Leinsters found that recruitment actually picked up after the suppression of the rising, but this stopped when it became known that the government was negotiating with the captured rebel leaders.

The Battle of the Somme began on 1 July and over the following months the demand for reinforcement drafts grew so much that training became difficult by October and November. Many wounded specialist officers were being sent straight back overseas instead of the normal practice of spending six months with the battalion, training men while convalescing (this was later reinstated). The battalion sent 309 men overseas during 1916. The garrison of Limerick was also increased and 4th Battalion headquarters became HQ for the whole garrison, with Lt-Col Weldon as senior military officer in Counties Limerick and Clare. On new year's eve the garrison received a warning that there might be a mutiny at the Tipperary Command Depot, and Garrison HQ despatched a company of the Lincolnshire Regiment, but it was not needed and returned the same day. An attack on the quarters of the Lincolns was foiled in February 1917 when the leaders were arrested and sent to Dublin. Early in 1917 Lt-Col Weldon was promoted to full Colonel, but in April he suffered a stroke and was invalided to hospital. He was placed on the retired list after almost 9 years in command of the battalion, and died on 29 June. Major Willington was appointed to succeed him.

On 22 July 1917 the battalion was ordered to Tralee, where the men occupied huts at Ballymullen Barracks. On arrival, the battalion found no training facilities, and had to construct an assault course, rifle ranges, and facilities for gas and bombing training. However, the political pressure on Irish battalions in Ireland following the Easter Rising was such that in November 1917 they were all moved to England. 4th Leinsters went by special train from Tralee to North Wall, Dublin, where it embarked for Holyhead. There it entrained for Dover where it joined 1st Dover Special Reserve Brigade and was quartered in Langdon Barracks. The area was subject to regular air raids and naval bombardments.

The losses incurred during the German spring offensive of March 1918 led to increased demands for drafts from the training battalions, which became very depleted. On 25 May the 4th (ER) Bn from Dover, together with the 5th (ER) Bn (the old Royal Meath Militia) at Glencorse Barracks, were closed down and their remaining personnel transferred to 3rd (R) Bn at Portsmouth. That battalion continued preparing drafts until the end of the war in November 1918.

== Disbandment ==
With the establishment of the Irish Free State in 1922, all British Army regiments based in Southern Ireland were disbanded, including the Prince of Wales's Own Leinsters. The 4th (Extra Reserve) Battalion was consequently disbanded on 31 July 1922.

== Commanders ==
=== Colonels ===
Colonels of the Regiment included;

- John Dawson, 1st Earl of Portarlington, commissioned 23 April 1793, died 1798
- Charles Coote, 2nd Baron Castle Coote, from 22 Jan 1799, died 1823
- Sir Charles Coote, 9th Baronet, from 1825, died 1864

=== Lieutenant-Colonels ===
Lieutenant-colonels (COs after 1852) included:

- Stewart Weldon in 1799
- Hon Charles Henry Coote, 11 April 1805, died 1810
- Francis Plunkett Dunne, 15 February 1846, died 1874
- Henry Daniel Carden, former lieutenant, 52nd Foot, promoted 14 May 1873
- Walter Joseph Borrowes, promoted 22 October 1884
- Frederick Kevan Izod, promoted 28 October 1893
- Bernard FitzPatrick, 2nd Baron Castletown, former lieutenant 1st Life Guards, promoted 4 October 1899
- Sir Anthony Weldon, 6th Baronet, CVO, DSO, promoted 12 July 1908, invalided April 1917
- Theodore Willington, promoted Acting Lt-Col on occasions from August 1914, confirmed in rank April 1917

=== Honorary Colonel ===
The following served as Honorary Colonel of the battalion:

- Henry Daniel Carden, former CO, appointed 20 November 1884
- George Dawson-Damer, 5th Earl of Portarlington, appointed 24 February 1894
- George Hastings Brooke, appointed 17 October 1900; reappointed to SR 12 July 1908

=== Other notable officers ===
- The Hon Robert Flower (later Viscount Ashbrook), commissioned as a lieutenant on 6 June 1859, resigned 15 December 1888 as a major and honorary lt-col
- Lt-Col T.R.A. Stannus, DSO, served in the Second Boer War with the Imperial Yeomanry, with 6th Leinsters at Gallipoli (wounded), and commanded 7th Leinsters on the Western Front; mortally wounded at the Battle of Messines

== Heritage and ceremonial ==
=== Uniform and insignia ===
The original uniform of the Queen's County Militia in 1793 was a red coat with blue facings. The facings remained blue in 1850, but after the Queen's County Militia became a rifle regiment, the uniform changed to Rifle green, with red facings appropriate to a royal regiment.

The Queen's County Rifles' badge comprised a bugle-horn suspended from a cord with a shamrock bow, above which was a crown and beneath a scroll with the regimental name.

In 1881 the battalion adopted the same uniform as the rest of the Prince of Wales's Leinsters, the red coat with blue facings worn by royal regiments.

The 4th Bn Leinster Regiment may have been the first Irish unit to re-introduce a pipe band, Lord Castletown presenting it with a set of Irish war pipes in 1903. Within 10 years all the battalions of the Leinsters had their own pipe bands. The pipe band of the 4th Bn went on recruiting tours round Ireland during World War I, with some success.

=== Precedence ===
On the outbreak of the French Revolutionary War the English counties had drawn lots to determine the relative precedence of their militia regiments. In 1798 the new Irish militia regiments received their own table of precedence, in which Queen's County came 25th. In 1833 King William IV drew the lots to determine an order of precedence for the whole of the United Kingdom. Those regiments raised before 1783 took the first 69 places, followed by the 60 regiments (including those in Ireland) raised for the French Revolutionary War: Queen's County took 104th place, and this remained unchanged when the list was updated in 1855. Most regiments took little notice of the numeral.

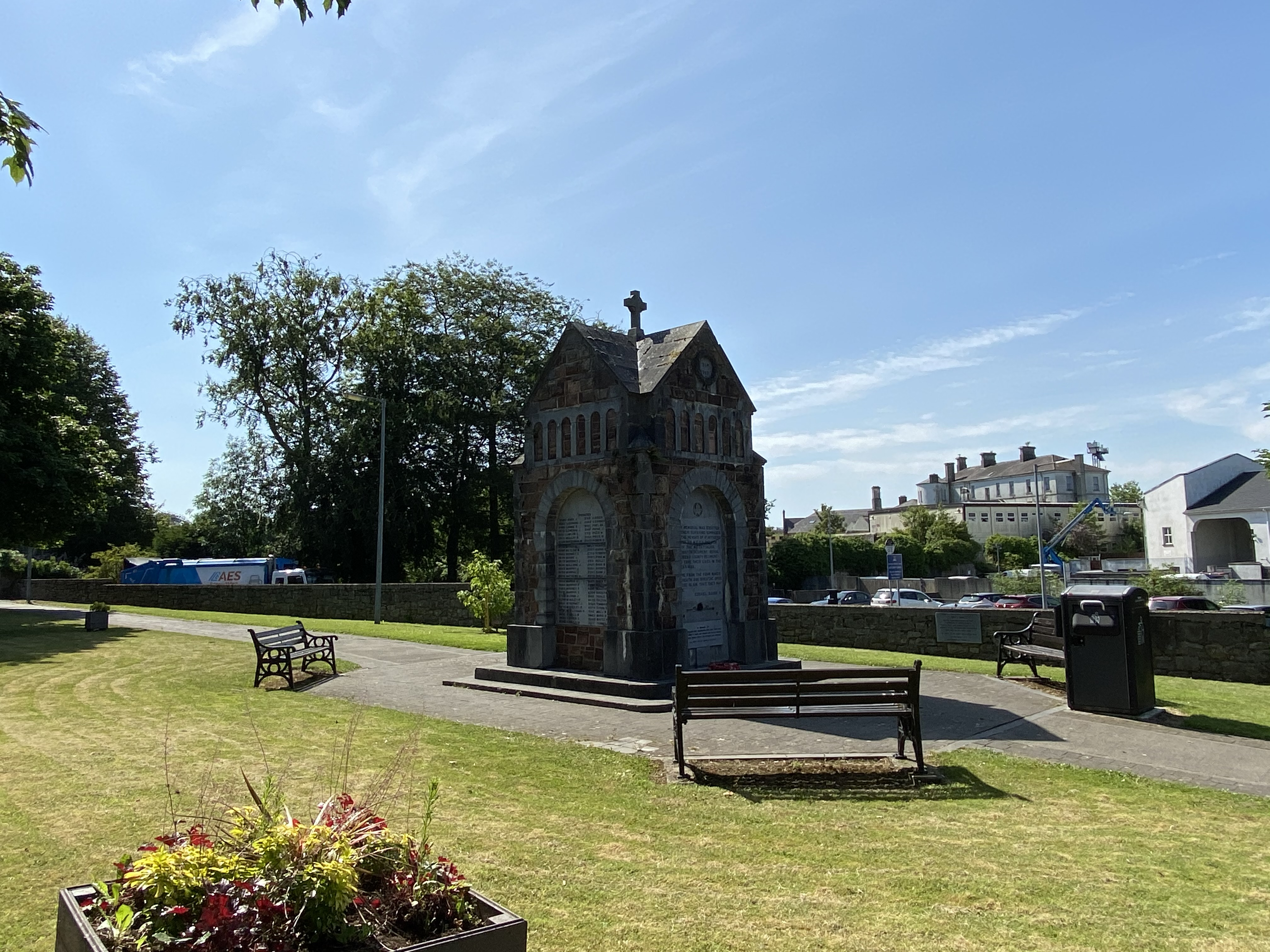
Portlaoise War Memorial

=== Memorial ===
A memorial to the 177 officers and ORs of 4th Leinsters who died in World War I was erected in Portlaoise (formerly Maryborough). Originally at Bank Place, it was relocated to Millview in 2001.

== See also ==
- Irish Militia
- Militia (United Kingdom)
- Special Reserve
- Prince of Wales's Leinster Regiment (Royal Canadians)
