= Leslie Ward =

British portrait artist and caricaturist (1851–1922)

Sir Leslie Ward
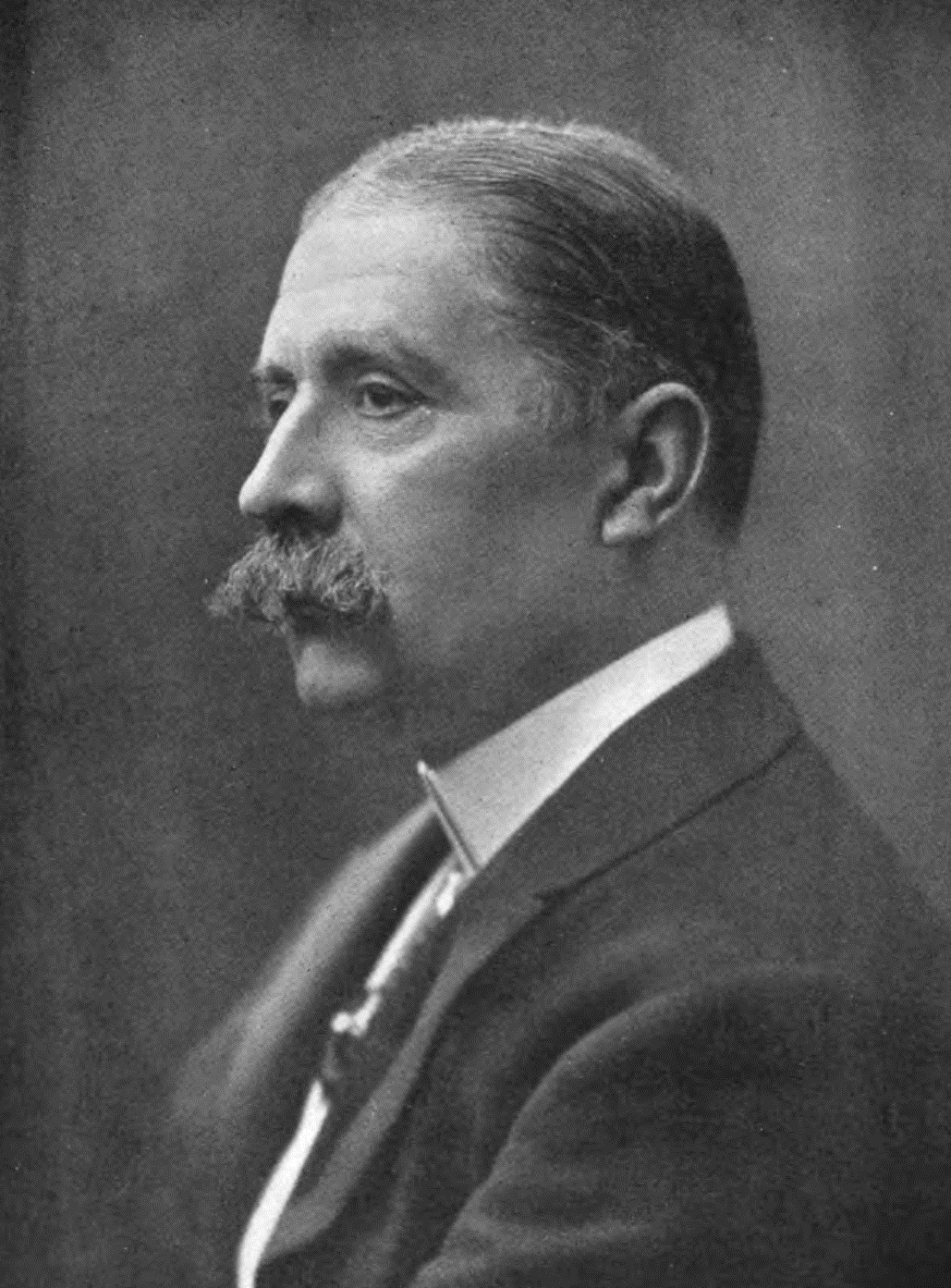
- Ward in 1915
- Born: Leslie Matthew Ward; 21 November 1851; London, England
- Died: 15 May 1922 (aged 70); London, England
- Known for: Portraits and caricatures
- Notable work: Vanity Fair Caricatures
- Parent(s): Edward Matthew Ward; Henrietta Ward
- Relatives: James Ward (great-grandfather)

Sir Leslie Matthew Ward (21 November 1851 – 15 May 1922) was a British portrait artist and caricaturist who over four decades painted 1,325 portraits which were regularly published by Vanity Fair, under the pseudonyms "Spy" and "Drawl". The portraits were produced as watercolours and turned into chromolithographs for publication in the magazine. These were then usually reproduced on better paper and sold as prints. Such was his influence in the genre that all Vanity Fair caricatures are sometimes referred to as "Spy cartoons" regardless of who the artist actually was.

Early portraits, almost always full-length (judges at the bench being the main exception), had a stronger element of caricature and usually distorted the proportions of the body, with a very large head and upper body supported on much smaller lower parts. Later, as he became more accepted by his social peers, and in order not to offend potential sitters, his style developed into what he called "characteristic portraits". This was less of a caricature and more of an actual portrait of the subject, using realistic body proportions.

== Background ==
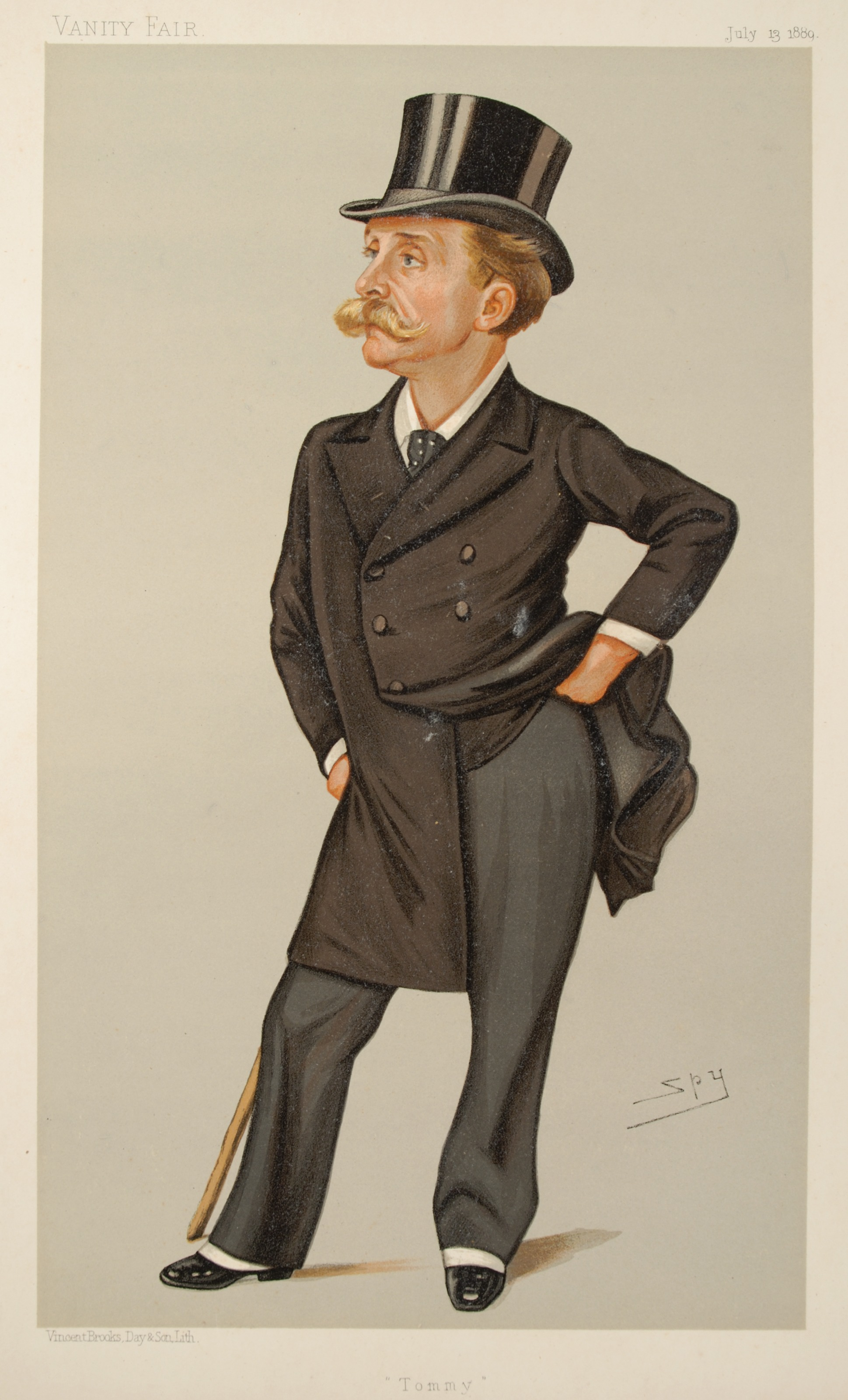
"Tommy" Bowles, founder of Vanity Fair, caricatured by Ward in 1889.

Ward was one of eight children of artists Edward Matthew Ward and Henrietta Ward, and the great-grandson of the artist James Ward. Although they had the same surname before marriage, Ward's parents were not related. Both were well-known history painters. His mother came from a line of painters and engravers: her father was the engraver and miniature painter George Raphael Ward; her grandfather was the celebrated animal painter James Ward. She was a niece of the portrait painter John Jackson and great-niece of the painter George Morland. Both parents had studios in their homes in Slough and Kensington in London, where they regularly entertained the London artistic and literary elite. Ward's father was a gifted mimic who entertained Charles Dickens and other eminent guests. Although they never gave their son formal training, they and their artistic friends encouraged the young Ward to draw, paint, and sculpt.

Ward started caricaturing while still at school at Eton College, using his classmates and school masters as subjects. In 1867 his bust of his brother was exhibited at the Royal Academy in London. At school, Ward had been an unexceptional student, and after he left Eton in 1869 his father encouraged him to train as an architect. Ward was too afraid to tell his father that he wanted to be an artist and he spent an unhappy year in the office of the architect Sydney Smirke, who was a family friend. The artist W. P. Frith spoke to Ward's father on his behalf, and after a great deal of arguing he finally agreed to support his son's training as an artist, and Ward entered the Royal Academy Schools in 1871. In 1873 he sent some of his work to Thomas Gibson Bowles, four years after Vanity Fair was founded. This led to him being hired to replace "Ape" (Carlo Pellegrini), who had temporarily left the magazine after falling out with Bowles. As his nom de crayon, Ward suggested to Bowles that he use the name "Spy", meaning "to observe secretly, or to discover at a distance or in concealment". Ward's Spy signature was similar to Pellegrini's stylised Ape.

== Vanity Fair ==
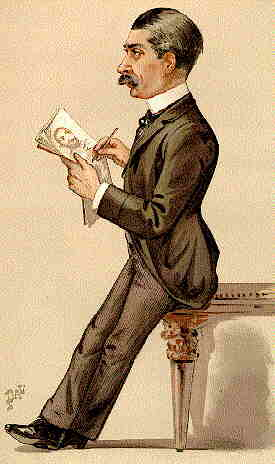
Leslie Ward caricatured in 1889 by 'Pal'

Ward drew 1,325 cartoons for Vanity Fair between 1873 and 1911, many of which captured the personality of his subjects. His portraits of royalty, nobility, and women, however, were over-sympathetic, if not sycophantic. Later, as he became a member of Society himself, he became even more of a complimentary portraitist, moving from caricature to what he termed "characteristic portraits", a charge he acknowledged in his autobiography Forty Years of "Spy", published in 1915.

Ward worked methodically, often from memory, after observing his 'victims' at the racecourse, in the law courts, in church, in the academy lecture theatre, or in the lobby of the Houses of Parliament. Sometimes they came to his studio to pose in their robes or uniforms. A caricaturist, Ward believed, was born, not made. He observed, "A good memory, an eye for detail, and a mind to appreciate and grasp the whole atmosphere and peculiarity of the 'subject' are of course essentials." A caricature, he noted, should never depend on a physical defect, nor should it be forced. "If I could sum up the art in a sentence it would be that caricature should be a comic impression with a kindly touch, and always devoid of vulgarity."

In an 1897 interview given by Oliver Armstrong Fry (editor of Vanity Fair) to Frank Banfield of Cassell's Magazine, it was reported that Ward received between £300 and £400 per portrait. Ward was the most famous Vanity Fair artist; indeed, the whole genre of caricatures is often referred to as "Spy cartoons". He worked for Vanity Fair for over forty years, producing more than half of the 2,387 caricatures published.

== Later years ==
Ward's clubs included the Arts, the Orleans, the Fielding, the Lotus, the Punch Bowl, and the Beefsteak, where he was one of the original members. There he sketched many of his victims. In 1899, years after her father had refused him permission to marry her, Ward married the society hostess Judith Mary Topham-Watney, the only daughter of Major Richard Topham of the 4th Queen's Own Hussars. They had one daughter, Sidney.

Ward's last cartoon for Vanity Fair appeared in June 1911 as he had recently begun contributing his "characteristic portraits" to The World and Mayfair. He supplemented his income by painting portraits. In 1918, he was knighted. Ward prophesied that "when the history of the Victorian era comes to be written in true perspective, the most faithful mirror and record of representative men and spirit of their times will be sought and found in Vanity Fair". After a nervous breakdown Ward died suddenly of heart failure at 4 Dorset Square, Marylebone, London on 15 May 1922 and was buried on 18 May at Kensal Green Cemetery in London.

About 300 of his original watercolours for Vanity Fair are in the National Portrait Gallery, London.

== Gallery ==
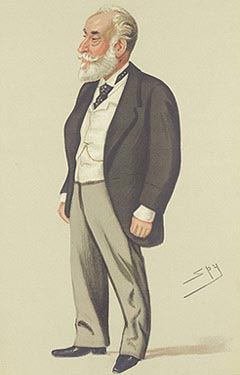
Sir Albert Sassoon, 1st Baronet, 1879

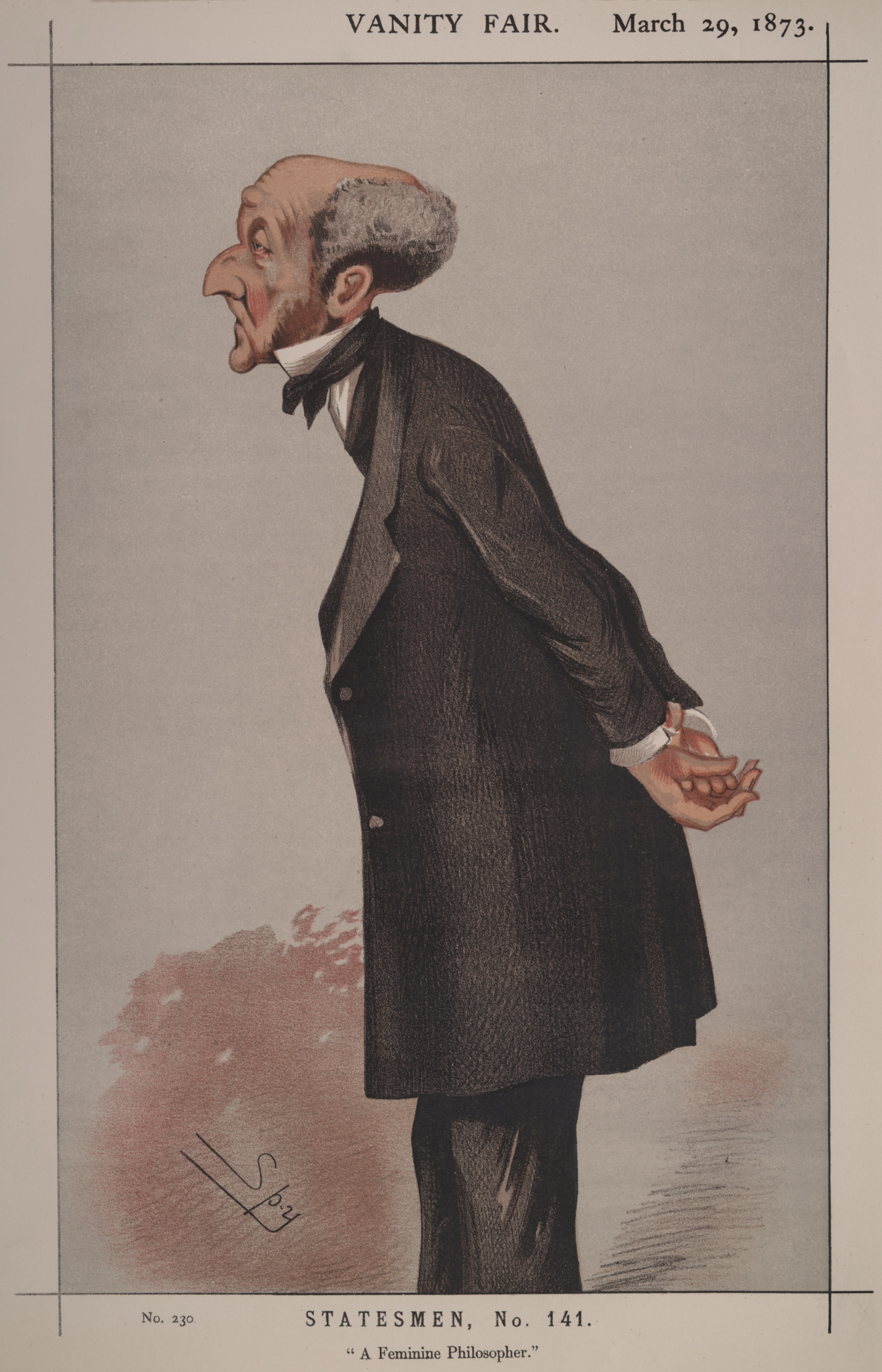
John Stuart Mill, 1873

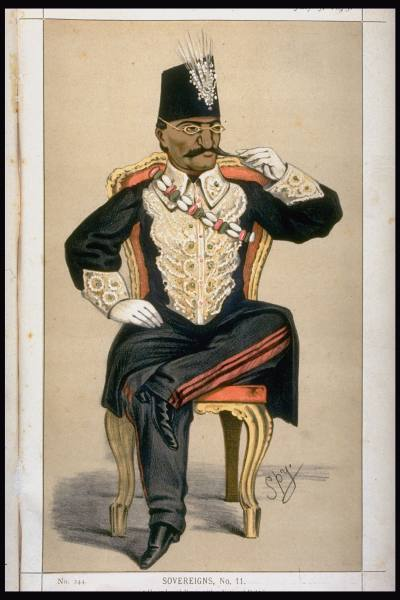
Nasser al-Din Shah Qajar, 1873

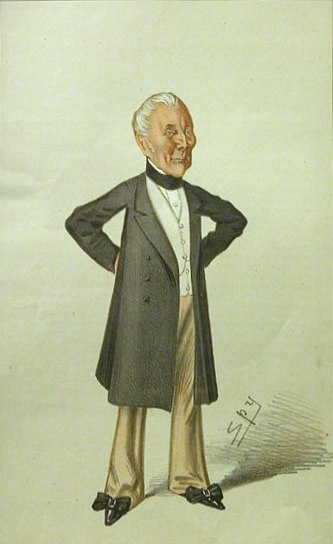
William Maynard Gomm, 1873

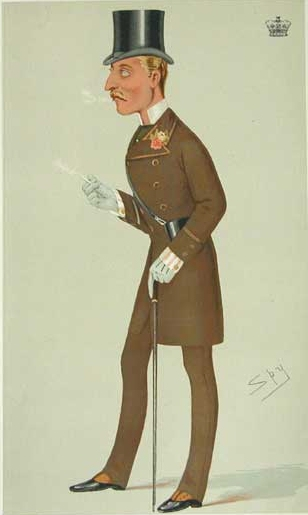
Prince Arthur, Duke of Connaught and Strathearn, 1876

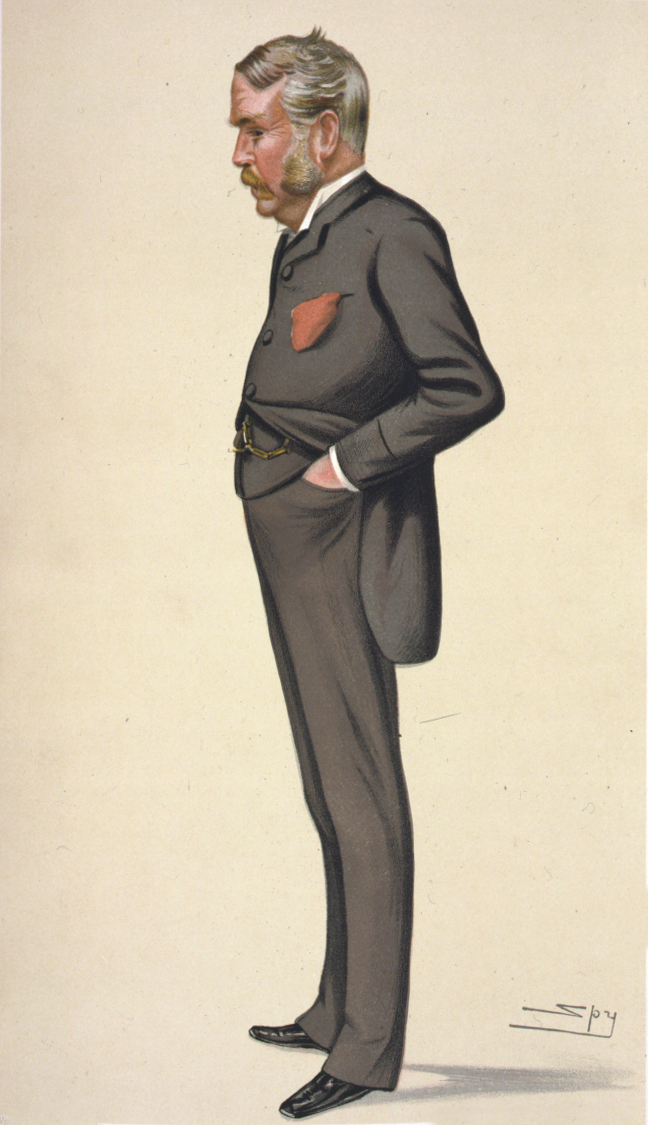
W. S. Gilbert, 1881

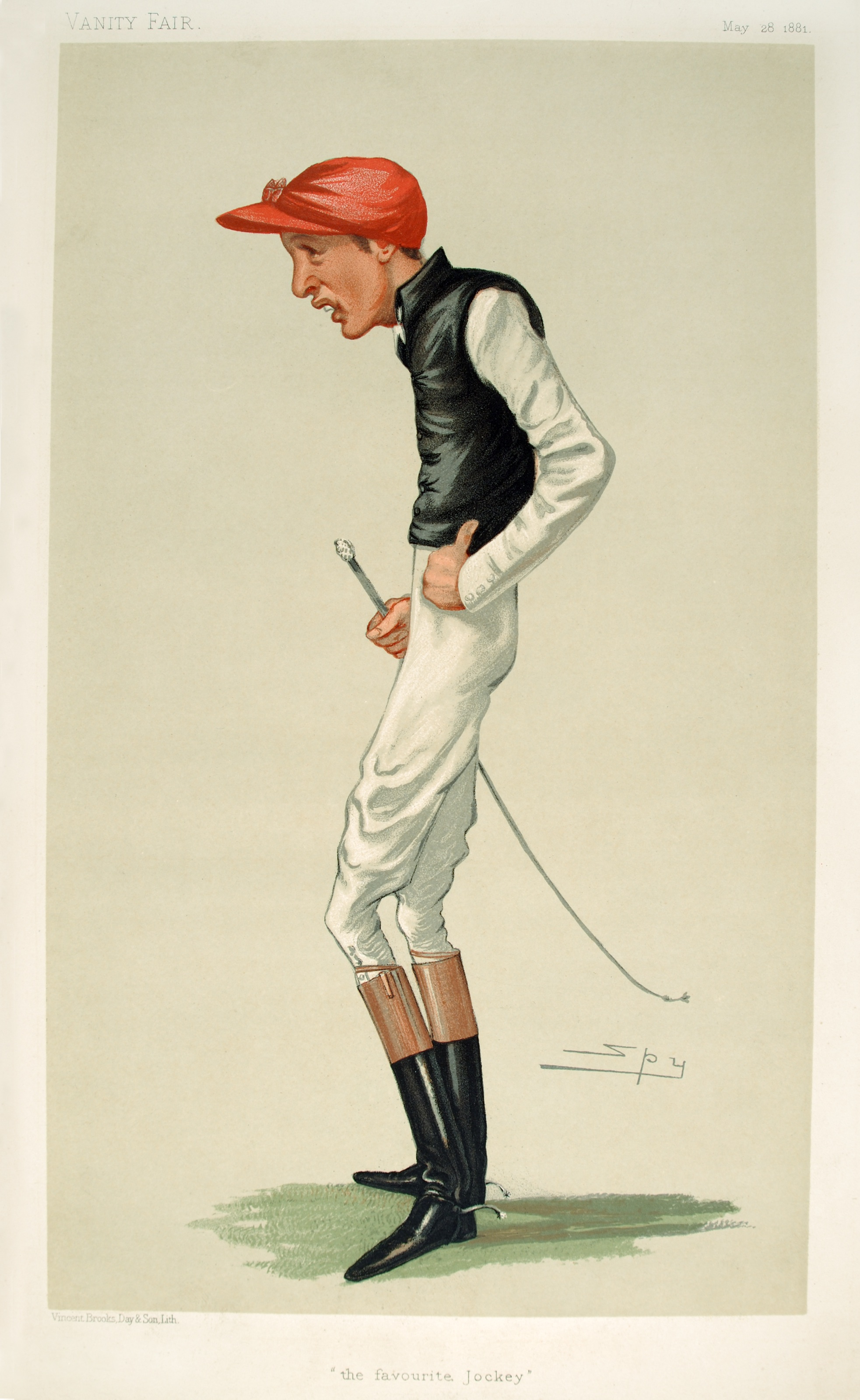
Fred Archer, 1881

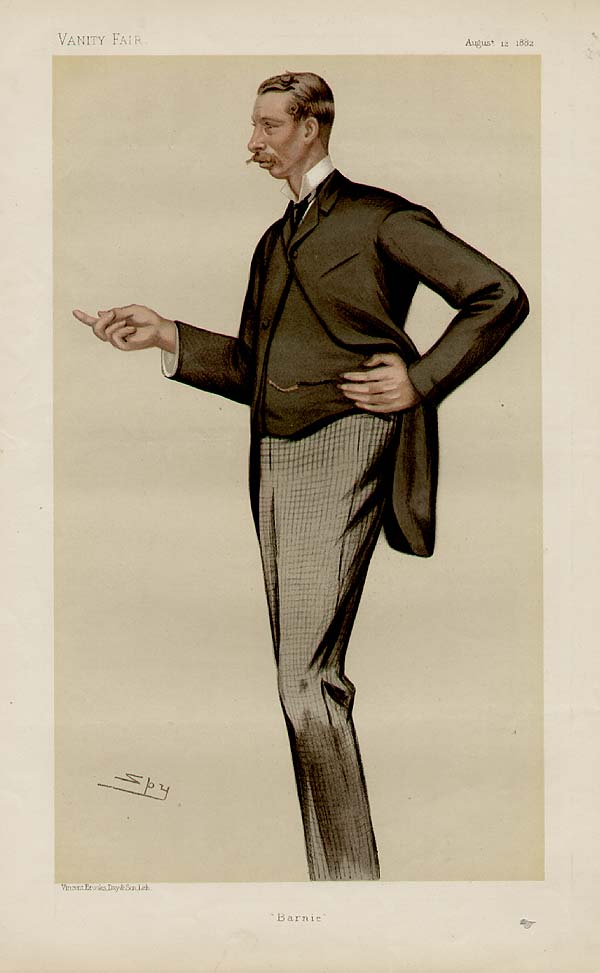
The Hon. Bernard FitzPatrick (The 2nd Baron Castletown from 1883), 1882

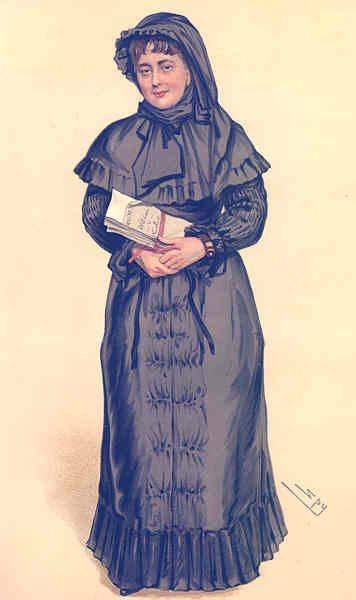
Mrs Georgina Weldon, 1884

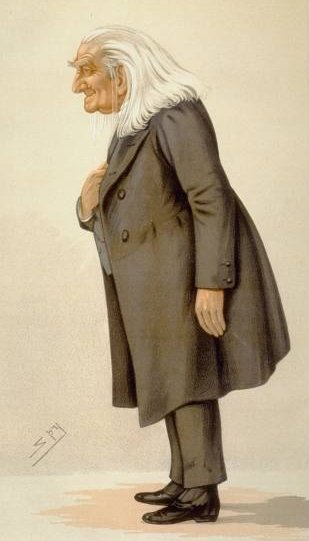
Franz Liszt, 1886

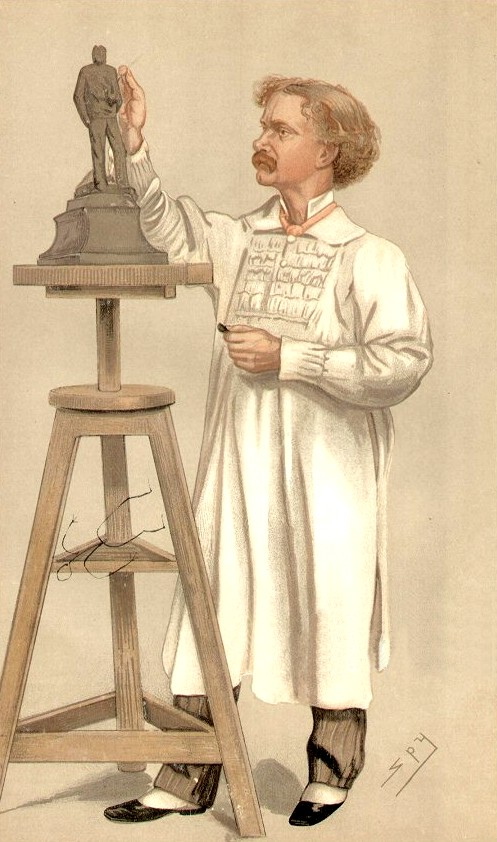
Hamo Thornycroft, 1892

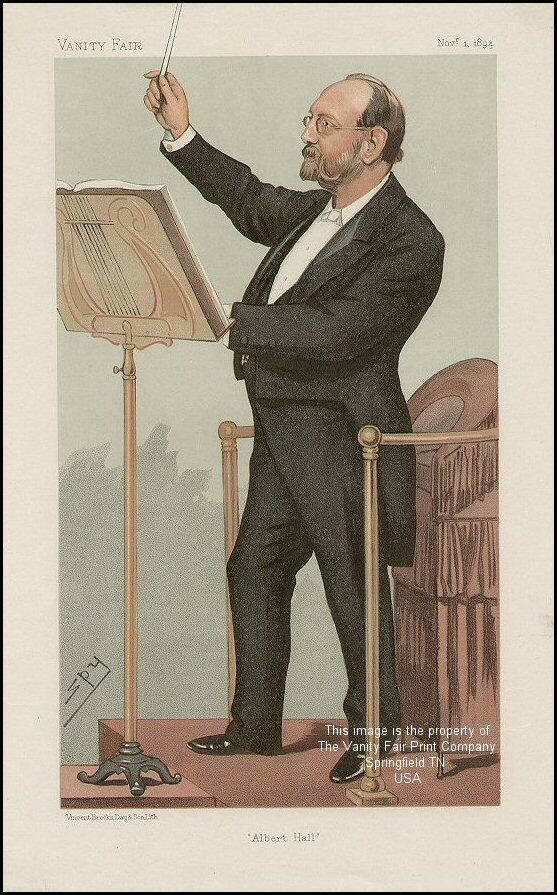
Joseph Barnby, 1894

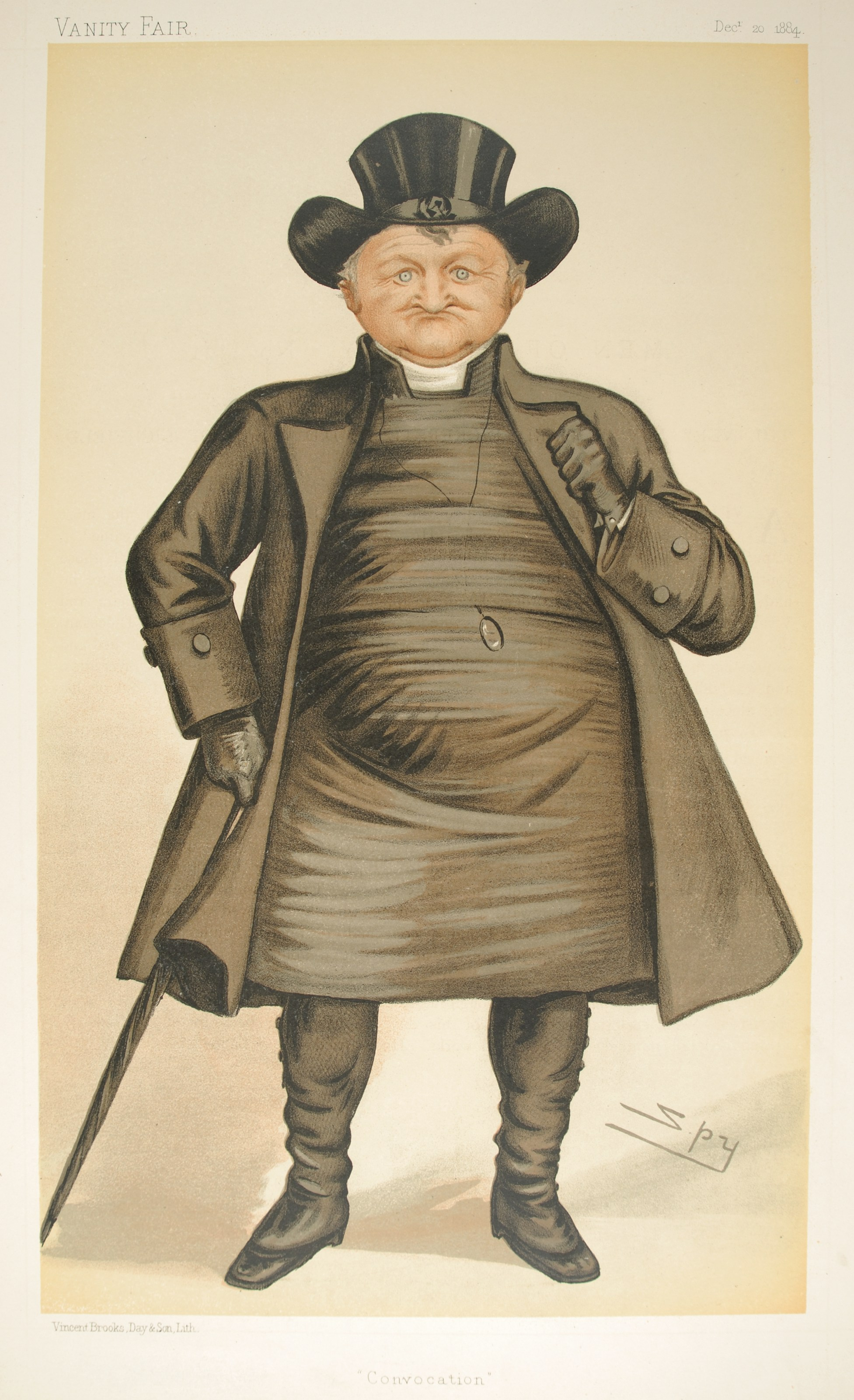
Edward Bickersteth, Dean of Lichfield, 1884

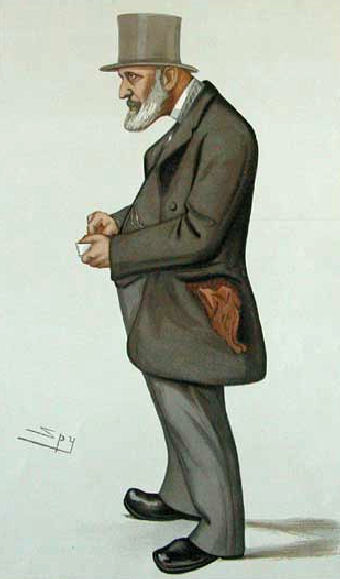
James Edwin Thorold Rogers, 1896

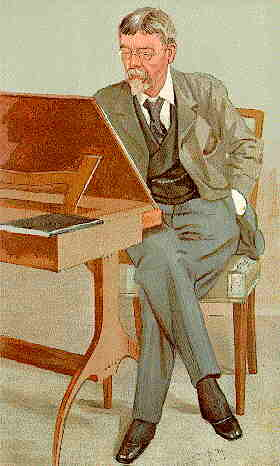
George du Maurier, 1896

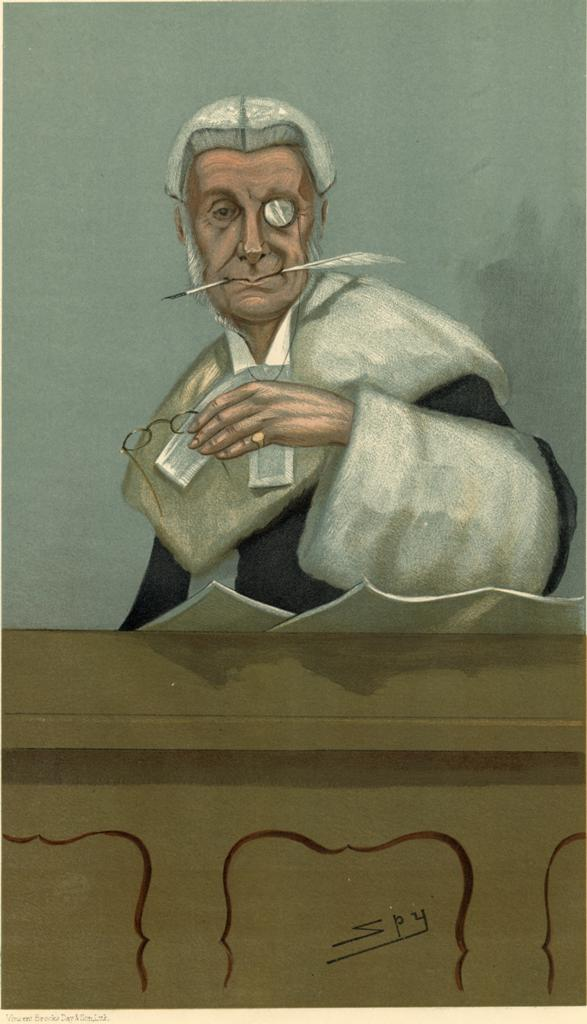
Arthur Moseley Channell, 1898

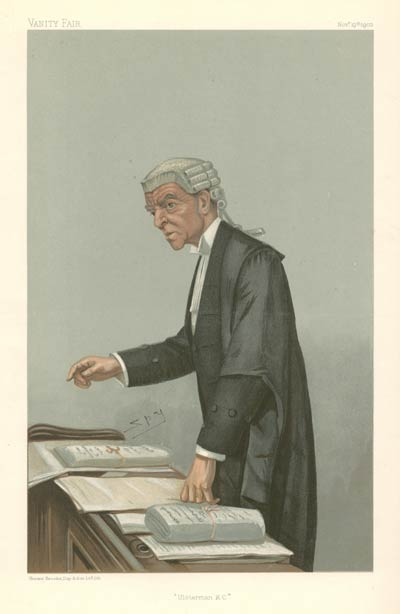
Robert McCall (barrister), 1903

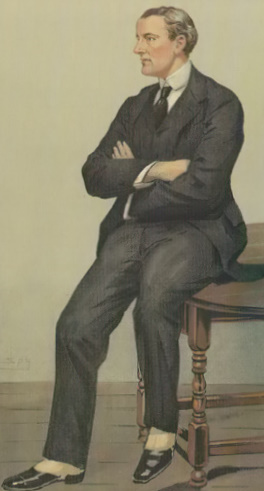
Edward Marshall Hall, 1903

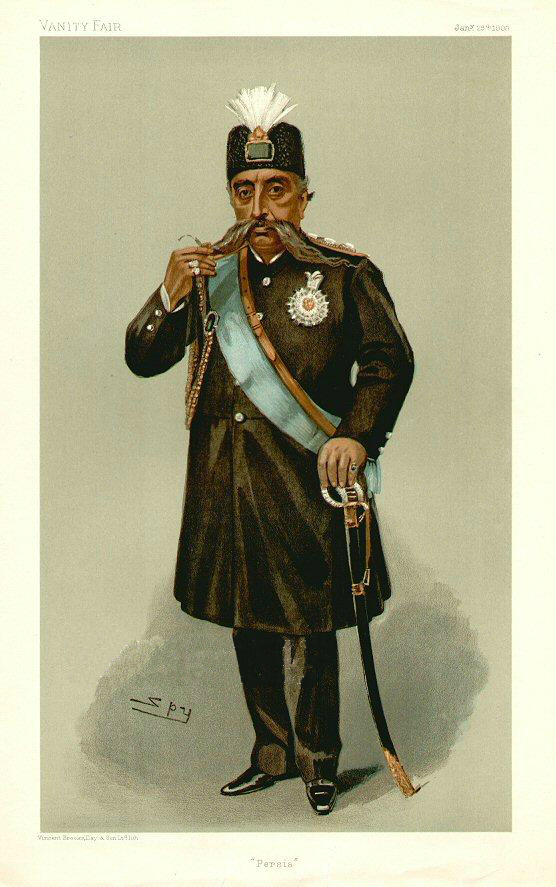
Mozaffar al-Din Shah Qajar, 1903

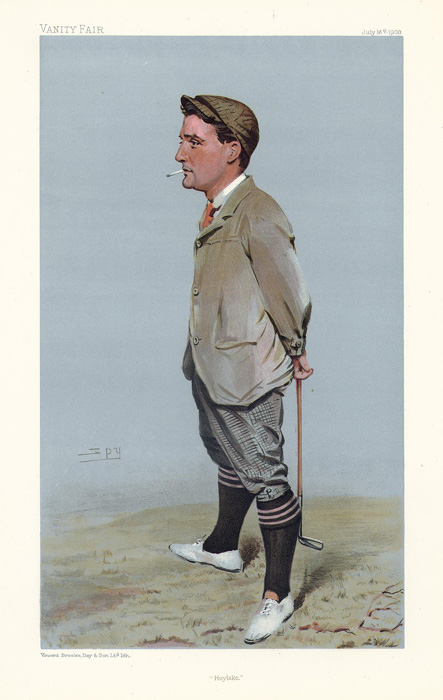
Harold Hilton, 1903

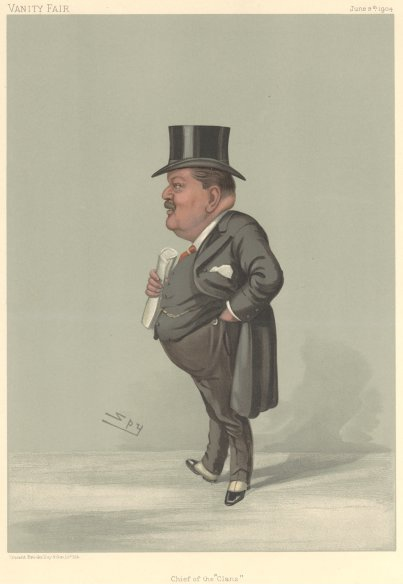
Sir Charles Cayzer, 1st Baronet, 1904, shipping magnate and MP

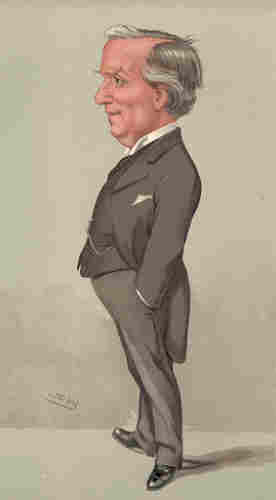
Herbert Henry Asquith, later Prime Minister, 1904

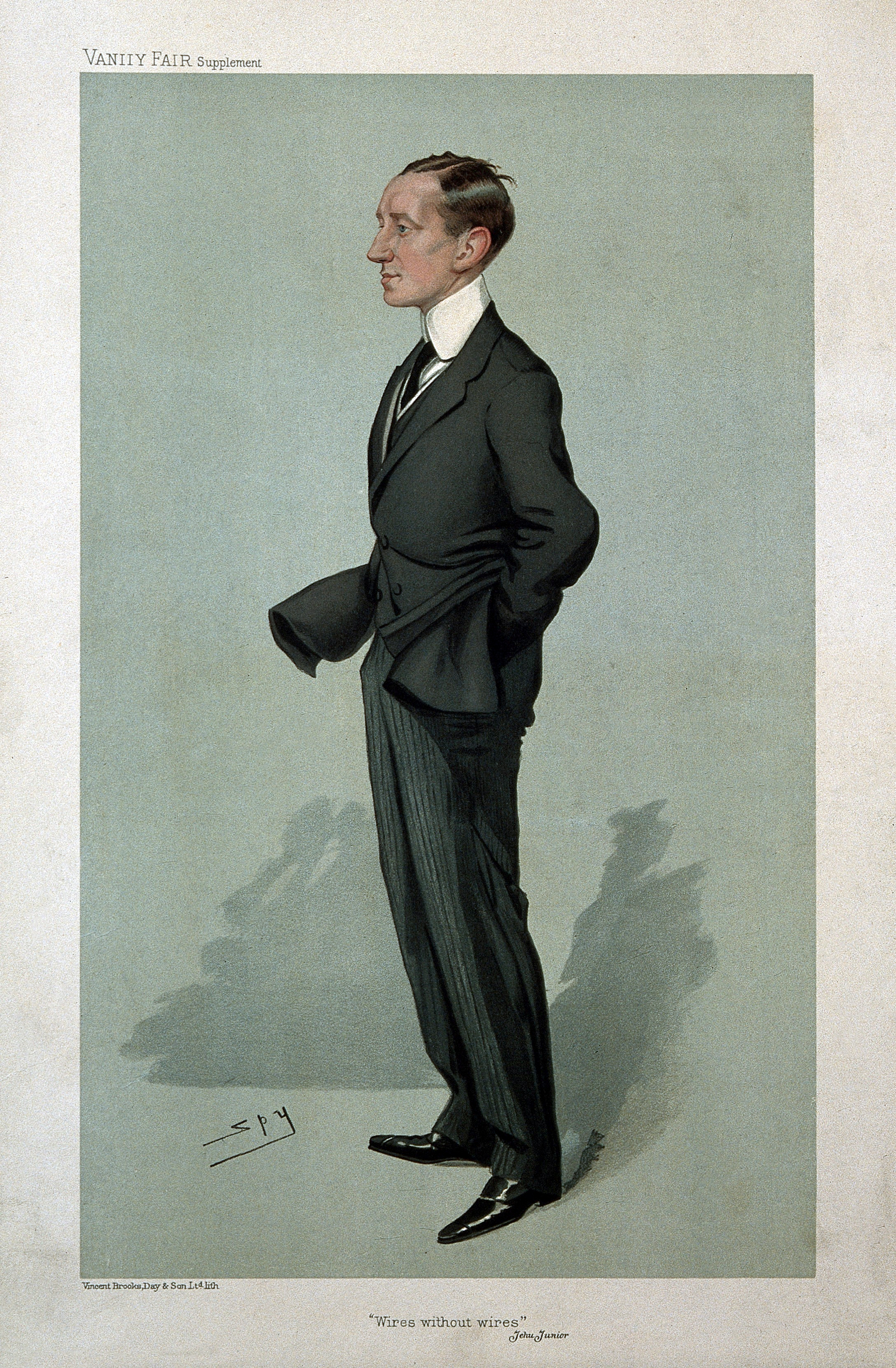
Guglielmo Marconi, 1905

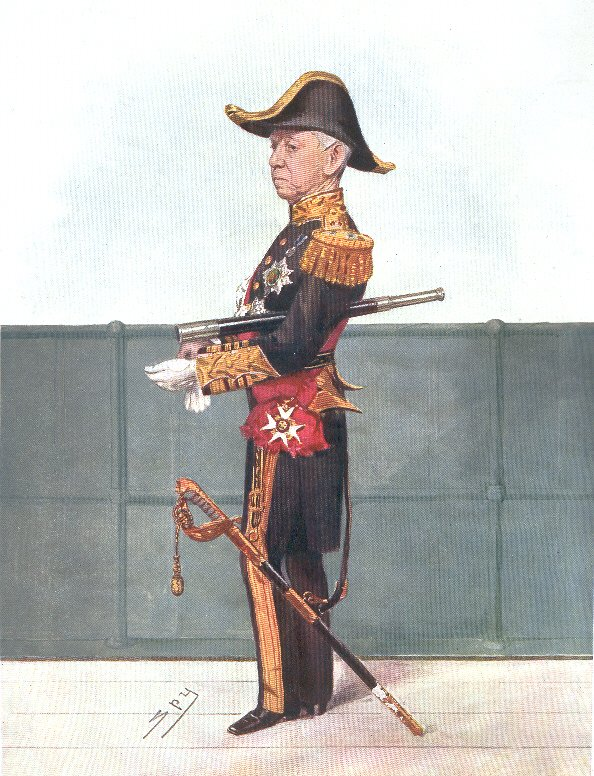
Admiral Sir Compton Edward Domvile, 1906

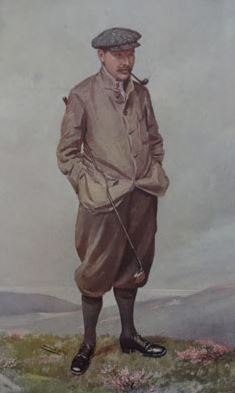
Robert Maxwell, 1906

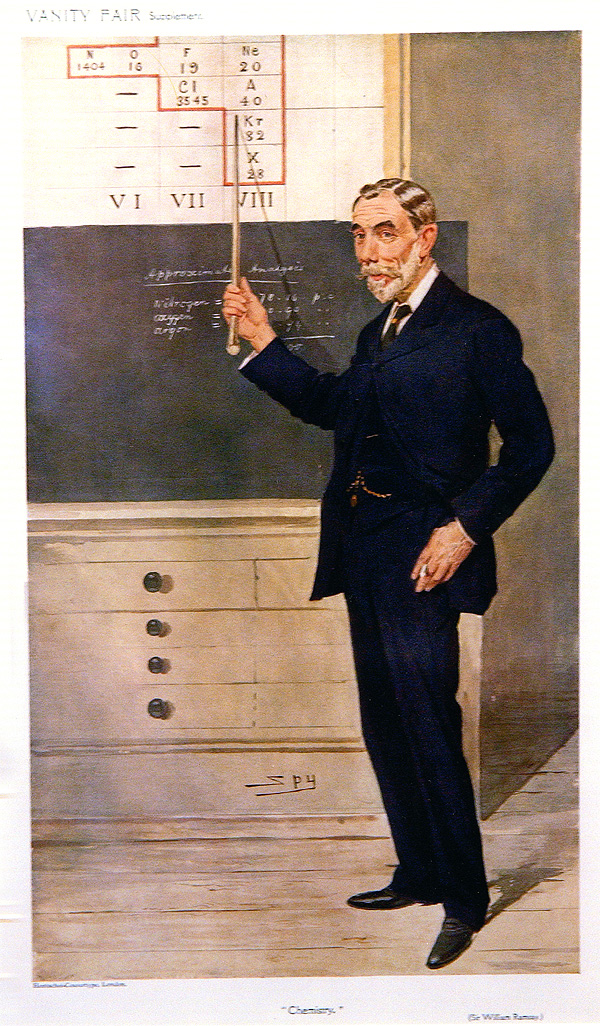
William Ramsay, 1908

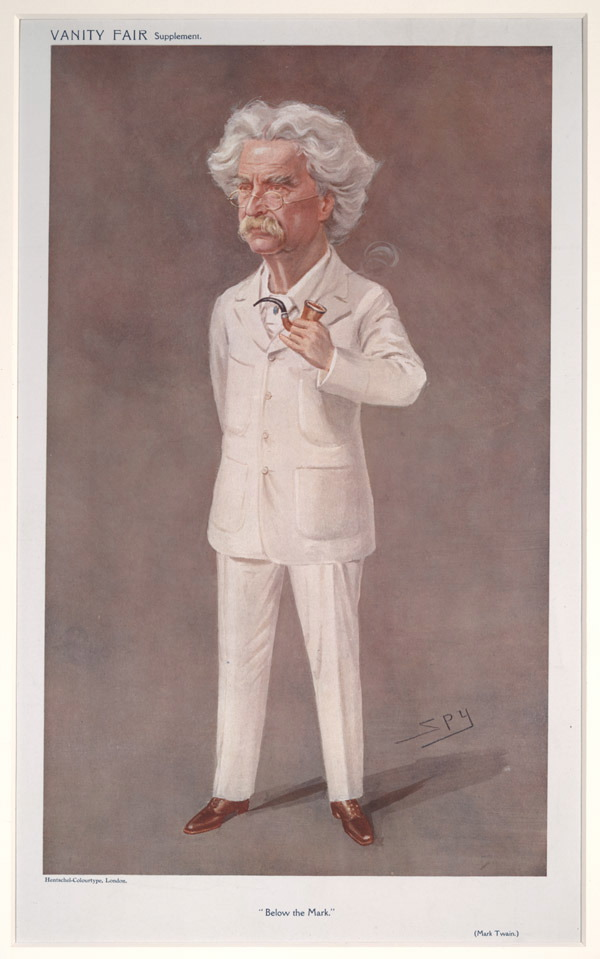
Mark Twain, 1908

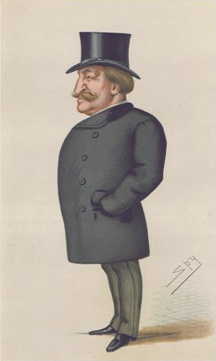
Nikolay Ignatyev

== See also ==
- Vanity Fair caricatures

== Publications ==
- Leslie Ward (1915), Forty Years of "Spy", London: Chatto and Windus. ISBN 1112549951.
