= Robert French-Brewster =

Irish army officer and politician, died 1901

Robert Abraham Brewster French-Brewster (died 20 May 1901), born Robert Abraham French, was an Irish army officer and politician. He represented Portarlington in the House of Commons from 1883 to 1885 as a Conservative.

Robert French was the only son of Henry French and Elizabeth Mary French, daughter of Abraham Brewster, the Lord Chancellor of Ireland. After his grandfather's death in 1874, he inherited his estates and assumed the additional name of Brewster. The total estates came to over £120,000, the majority of which was inherited by Robert, including a house in Merrion Square, Dublin.

He was commissioned as an officer in the 1st (King's) Dragoon Guards in August 1872, and resigned his commission in July 1880.

French-Brewster was elected to Parliament in a February 1883 by-election in the small Irish borough of Portarlington, after the incumbent member, Bernard FitzPatrick, succeeded to his father's peerage and entered the House of Lords. The seat was generally Conservative and had a very small electorate; he was elected with 70 votes against a Liberal challenger with 57. The seat was abolished following the Redistribution of Seats Act 1885 and French-Brewster did not seek re-election elsewhere at the subsequent general election.

French-Brewster had married Geraldine Cooper in 1876, and they had three sons, born 1877, 1878, and 1882. In 1889 both sued for divorce, each alleging adultery on the other's part; the court case was a high-profile one, lasting six days at the High Court, with Robert represented by Edward Clarke MP, the Solicitor-General; Geraldine by Charles Russell MP, a future Attorney-General and Lord Chief Justice; and Henry Gore, the co-respondent, by H. H. Asquith MP, a future Prime Minister. After an extensively reported six-day hearing, a divorce was granted on the grounds of desertion and adultery by Robert but not Geraldine, and she was awarded a decree nisi.

French-Brewster died of pneumonia at Nuneham Park, outside Abingdon, on 20 May 1901.
