= John Vesey, 4th Viscount de Vesci =

Anglo-Irish peer and British Army officer

The Right Honourable The Viscount de Vesci
- Arms of Viscount de Vesci, being a differenced version of his ancestral arms of Vesey: Or, on a cross sable a patriarchal cross of the field.

Member of the House of Lords (Note: As Baron de Vesci.)
- Lord Temporal
- In office 8 November 1884 – 6 July 1903
- Preceded by: Peerage created
- Succeeded by: Peerage extinct

Personal details
- Born: John Robert William Vesey; 21 May 1844
- Died: 6 July 1903 (aged 59)
- Other titles: 5th Baron Knapton; 1st Baron de Vesci; 6th Baronet

The Rt Hon. John Robert William "Yvo" Vesey, (Note: Per inscribed brass tablet to his daughter in Brushford Church, Somerset "Yvo 4th Viscount de Vesci" (see Pixton Park).) 4th Viscount de Vesci (21 May 1844 – 6 July 1903), was an Anglo-Irish peer and British Army officer.

== Biography ==
He was the eldest son and heir of the 3rd Viscount de Vesci (d. 1875) by his wife, Lady Emma Herbert (1819–1884), youngest daughter of the 11th Earl of Pembroke. In 1863, he was commissioned into the Coldstream Guards. He was promoted to captain in 1866, and to lieutenant colonel in 1876. On 23 December 1875, he succeeded to his father's titles in the Peerage of Ireland. Lord de Vesci retired from the army in 1883. On 8 November 1884, he was created Baron de Vesci, of Abbey Leix in the Queen's County, in the Peerage of the United Kingdom, thus giving him an hereditary seat in the House of Lords. Between 1883 and 1900, he served as Lord Lieutenant of Queen's County.

== Marriage and children ==
Arms of Hon. Aubrey Herbert, of six quarters with inescutcheon of pretence of Vesey, for his wife Hon. Mary Gertrude Vesey, a heraldic heiress. Herbert Chapel, Brushford Church, Somerset

On 4 June 1872, he married Lady Evelyn Charteris, eldest daughter of the 10th Earl of Wemyss by his wife, Lady Anne Frederica Anson, by whom he had one daughter and sole heiress:

- Hon. Mary Gertrude Vesey (10 April 1889 – 28 November 1970), who married Hon. Aubrey Herbert (1880–1923) of Pixton Park in Somerset, second son of the 4th Earl of Carnarvon. She died at Pixton, as is recorded on her brass memorial tablet in the Herbert Chapel, Brushford Church, Somerset.

== Death and succession ==
Lord de Vesci died in 1903 leaving no sons, so his British peerage became extinct, while his Irish titles were inherited by his nephew, Ivo Vesey, who became the 5th Viscount de Vesci. His personal estate in England and Ireland was valued at £44,247; in his will he confirmed a £10,000 settlement on his daughter Mary. His estates at Ravensdale and Carlingford, as well as all of his real estate in the countries of Louth and Armagh were placed in a trust for his widow with a remainder to their daughter. His estates in Kent, Dublin, Cork and Limerick were placed in trust to his nephew and successor to viscountcy, Ivo Richard Vesey, and thereafter to Ivo's male-line descendants; this property was charged with annuties for his daughter, widow, and sister Beatrice Vesey, as well as an additional £10,000 to be settled on his daughter in the event that she married.

== Notes ==
Honorary titles
Preceded by The Lord Castletown	Lord Lieutenant of Queen's County; 1883–1900	Succeeded by Sir Algernon Coote, Bt.
Peerage of Ireland
Preceded by Thomas Vesey	Viscount de Vesci; 1875–1903	Succeeded by Ivo Vesey
Preceded by Thomas Vesey	Baron Knapton; 1875–1903	Succeeded by Ivo Vesey
Baronetage of Ireland
Preceded by Thomas Vesey	Baronet of Abbeyleix; 1875–1903	Succeeded by Ivo Vesey
Peerage of the United Kingdom
New creation	Baron de Vesci; 1884–1903; Member of the House of Lords (1884–1903)	Extinct
