= Sir Charles Coote, 9th Baronet =

British Member of Parliament (1794–1864)

Sir Charles Coote
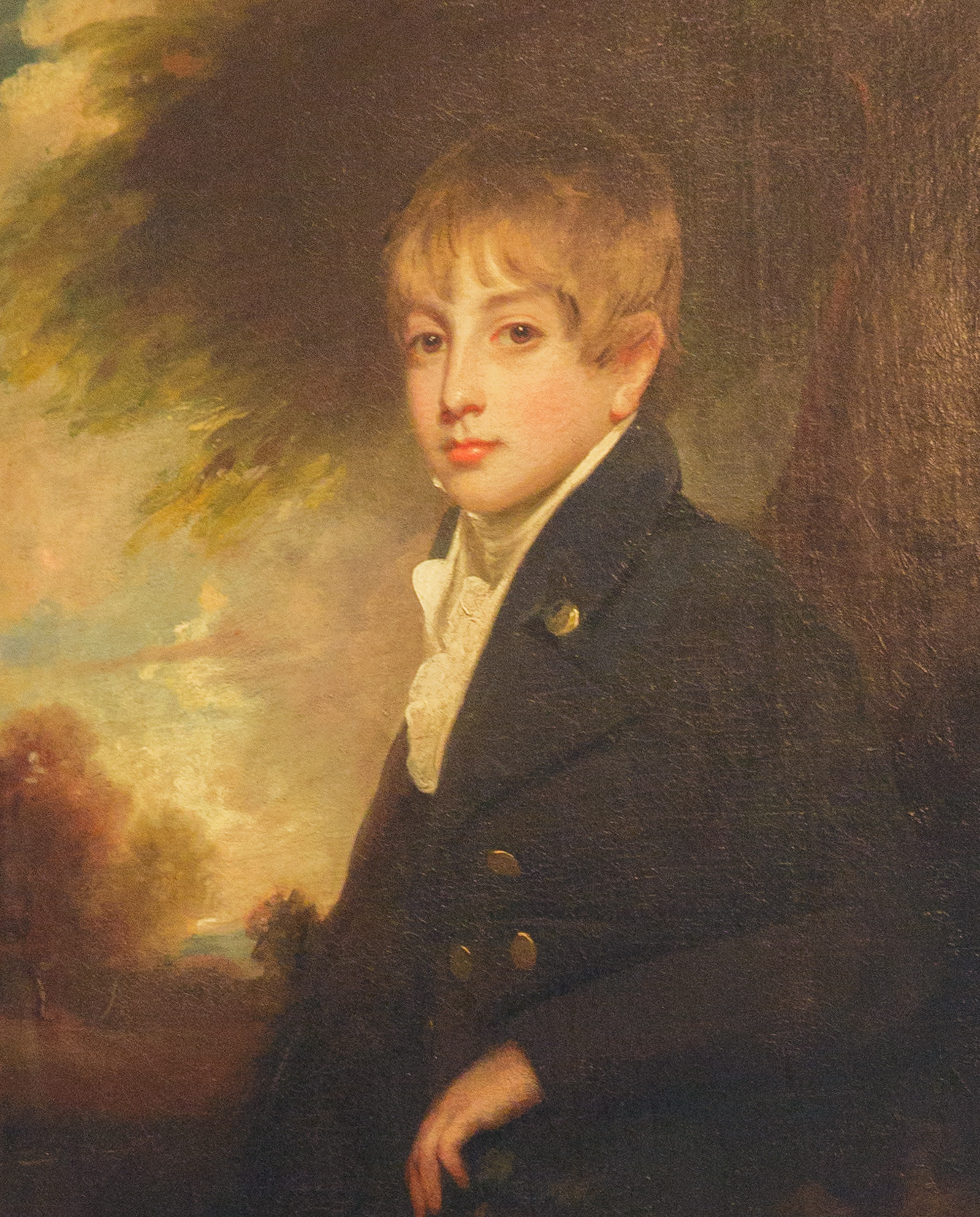
- Portrait by John Hoppner, c. 1803

Member of Parliament for Queen's County
- In office 19 July 1852 – 10 May 1859 Serving with Michael Dunne
- Preceded by: John FitzPatrick; Thomas Vesey
- Succeeded by: Michael Dunne; Francis Plunkett Dunne
- In office 27 August 1821 – 7 August 1847 Serving with Thomas Vesey (1841–1847); John FitzPatrick (1837–1841); Thomas Vesey (1835–1837); Patt Lalor (1832–1835); Henry Parnell (1821–1832)
- Preceded by: William Wellesley-Pole; Henry Parnell
- Succeeded by: John FitzPatrick; Thomas Vesey

Personal details
- Born: 2 January 1794
- Died: 8 October 1864 (aged 70)
- Party: Conservative/Tory

Sir Charles Henry Coote, 9th Baronet (2 January 1794 – 8 October 1864) was an Irish Conservative and Tory politician.

== Family and early life ==
Coote was the son of Chidley Coote of Ash Hill, County Limerick, and Elizabeth Anne née Carr. Educated at Eton College (leaving in 1805) and Trinity College, Cambridge (leaving in 1809), he married Caroline Whaley (daughter of John Whaley) in 1814. They had five sons and two daughters, including: Charles Henry (1815–1895); John Chidley (1816–1879); Algernon (1817–1899); Caroline (1819–1848); Robert (1820–1898); and Chidley Downes (1829–1872).

== Baronetcy ==
A distant descendant of Sir Charles Coote, 1st Baronet, he succeeded to the Coote baronetcy in 1802 upon the death of Charles Coote, 7th Earl of Mountrath. Upon his own death in 1864, the title passed to his eldest son, Sir Charles Henry Coote, 10th Baronet.

== Member of Parliament ==
While he initially stood unsuccessfully in 1818 and 1820, Coote was first elected Tory MP for Queen's County at a by-election in 1821—caused by the elevation of William Wellesley-Pole to Lord Maryborough—and, becoming a Conservative in 1834, held the seat until 1847, when he did not seek re-election. During this period, he was known as a lax attender, and he generally divided with the Tory leader Lord Liverpool, occasionally siding with the Whigs on matters such as the abolition of joint-postmasterships and inquiries into the borough franchise.

He returned at the next election in 1852 and held the seat until 1859 when he, again, did not seek re-election.

In 1825 he was appointed Colonel of the disembodied Queen's County Militia, acting as Honorary Colonel after the Militia was revived in 1852.

Parliament of the United Kingdom
Preceded by William Wellesley-Pole; Henry Parnell	Member of Parliament for Queen's County; 1821–1847; With: Thomas Vesey (1841–1847); John FitzPatrick (1837–1841); Thomas Vesey (1835–1837); Patt Lalor (1832–1835); Henry Parnell (1821–1832)	Succeeded by John FitzPatrick; Thomas Vesey
Preceded by John FitzPatrick; Thomas Vesey	Member of Parliament for Queen's County; 1852–1859; With: Michael Dunne	Succeeded by Michael Dunne; Francis Plunkett Dunne
Baronetage of the United Kingdom
Preceded by Charles Coote	Baronet (of Castle Cuffe); 1802–1864	Succeeded by Charles Henry Coote
