= Baron Castletown =

Title in the Peerage of the United Kingdom

Barony Castletown
- Sable a saltire argent, on a chief azure three fleur-de-lis or, all within a bordure wavy of the second
- Creation date: 10 December 1869
- Created by: Queen Victoria
- Peerage: Peerage of Ireland
- First holder: John FitzPatrick
- Last holder: Bernard FitzPatrick, 2nd Baron Castletown
- Remainder to: First baron's heirs male of the body lawfully begotten
- Extinction date: 29 May 1937
- Former seats: Granston Manor, County Laois; Templemore, County Tipperary
- Motto: Fortis sub forte fatiscet ("The strong will yield to the strong")

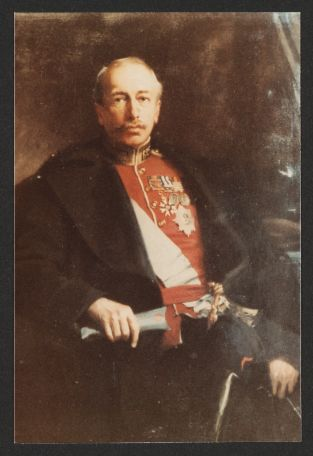
Bernard FitzPatrick, 2nd Baron Castletown.

Baron Castletown, of Upper Ossory in the Queen's County, was a title in the Peerage of the United Kingdom. It was created on 10 December 1869 for John FitzPatrick, the former Liberal Member of Parliament for Queen's County. He was the illegitimate son of John FitzPatrick, 2nd Earl of Upper Ossory.

The barony became extinct upon the death of his son, the 2nd Baron, on 29 May 1937. He had married Hon. Ursula Emily Clare St. Leger, daughter of the fourth Viscount Doneraile, but they had no children

== Barons Castletown (1869) ==
- John Wilson FitzPatrick, 1st Baron Castletown (1811–1883)
- Bernard Edward Barnaby FitzPatrick, 2nd Baron Castletown (1849–1937)

== See also ==
- Earl of Upper Ossory
