= Thomas Vesey, 3rd Viscount de Vesci =

Anglo-Irish peer and Conservative politician

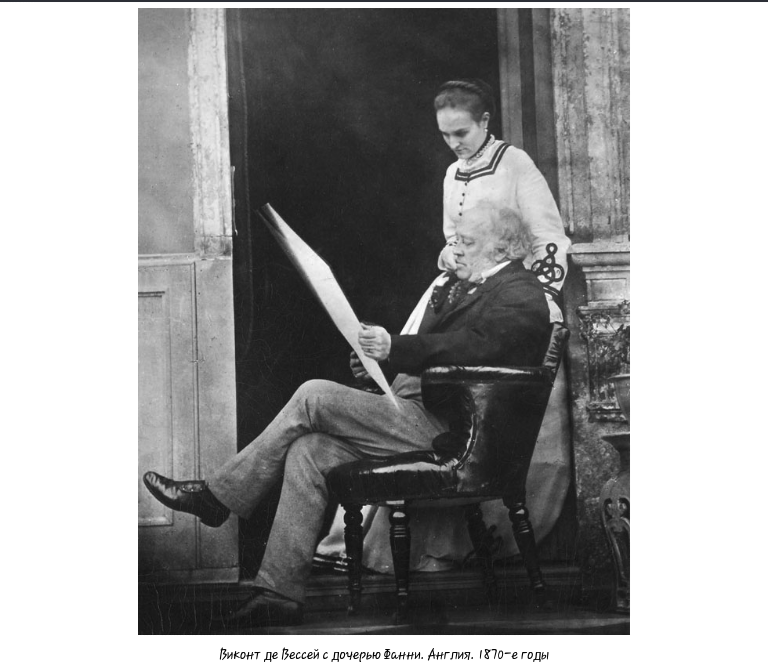
Lord de Vesci with his daughter Frances, 1870

Lieutenant-Colonel Thomas Vesey, 3rd Viscount de Vesci and 4th Baron Knapton (21 September 1803 – 23 December 1875), was an Anglo-Irish peer and Conservative politician.

== Background ==
de Vesci was the son of The 2nd Viscount de Vesci and Frances Letitia, daughter of William Brownlow.

== Political career ==
The Honourable John Vesey, as he then was, sat as Member of Parliament for the Queen's County between 1835 and 1837 and 1841 and 1852. In October 1855, he succeeded his father to become The 3rd Viscount de Vesci. In 1857, as Lord de Vesci, he was elected an Irish representative peer and entered the House of Lords.

== Marriage and progeny ==
In 1839, the future Lord de Vesci married Lady Emma Herbert (1819-October 1884), youngest daughter of The 11th Earl of Pembroke. She founded the Abbeyleix Baby Linen Society, a cooperative enabling women access to affordable baby clothing. By his wife he had progeny including:

- John Vesey, 4th Viscount de Vesci, eldest son and heir.
- Eustace Vesey who was the father of Thomas Eustace Vesey and Ivo Richard Vesey, 5th Viscount de Vesci
- Frances Isabella Catherine Vesey, who married The 4th Marquess of Bath
- Beatrice Charlotte Elizabeth Vesey, who married The 1st Baron Stalbridge, a brother of The 1st Duke of Westminster.

== Death and succession ==
Lord de Vesci died in December 1875, aged 72, and was succeeded by his son, John Vesey, 4th Viscount de Vesci.

Parliament of the United Kingdom
Preceded by Sir Charles Coote, Bt; Patrick Lalor	Member of Parliament for Queen's County; 1835–1837; With: Sir Charles Coote, Bt	Succeeded by Sir Charles Coote, Bt; John FitzPatrick
Preceded by Sir Charles Coote, Bt; John FitzPatrick	Member of Parliament for Queen's County; 1841–1852; With: Sir Charles Coote, Bt 1841–1847; John FitzPatrick 1847–1852	Succeeded by Michael Dunne; Sir Charles Coote, Bt
Political offices
Preceded by The Viscount Hawarden	Representative peer for Ireland; 1857–1875	Succeeded by The Lord Massy
Peerage of Ireland
Preceded by John Vesey	Viscount de Vesci; 1855–1875	Succeeded by John Vesey
Preceded by John Vesey	Baron Knapton; 1855–1875	Succeeded by John Vesey
Baronetage of Ireland
Preceded by John Vesey	Baronet (of Abbeyleix); 1855–1875	Succeeded by John Vesey
