= John FitzPatrick, 1st Baron Castletown =

Irish politician (1811–1883)

John FitzPatrick, 1st Baron Castletown PC
- Arms of John FitzPatrick, 1st Baron Castletown:Sable a saltire argent, on a chief azure three fleur-de-lis or, all within a bordure wavy of the second

Member of Parliament for Queen's County
- In office 1837–1841; 1847–1852; 1865–1869

Personal details
- Born: 24 September 1809 London, England
- Died: 22 January 1883 (aged 71)
- Party: Liberal
- Spouse: Augusta Douglas (m. 1830)
- Children: 7, including Bernard
- Parent: John FitzPatrick (father)

John Wilson FitzPatrick, 1st Baron Castletown PC (born John Wilson; 24 September 1809 – 22 January 1883) was an Anglo-Irish Liberal politician.

== Early life and education ==
Castletown, baptised John Wilson, was born in London, the illegitimate son of John FitzPatrick, 2nd Earl of Upper Ossory and Elizabeth Wilson. He had a brother, Richard, who died young, and an elder sister, Emma Mary (died 25 September 1882), who married Robert Vernon Smith (later Lord Lyveden). After their father's death in 1818, they were raised at Ampthill Park under the guardianship of their cousin Henry Vassall-Fox, 3rd Baron Holland (1773–1840), who inherited Ampthill from the earl. They were also under the guardianship of their half-sisters, Lady Anne and Lady Gertrude Fitzpatrick.

He was educated at Eton.

He inherited parts of his father's estates in Ireland in 1823, when he reached the age of majority.

== Career ==
Wilson, who in 1842 assumed the surname of FitzPatrick by Royal Licence, was appointed High Sheriff of Queen's County in 1836. He was then elected to the House of Commons for Queen's County in 1837, a seat he represented until 1841, and again from 1847 to 1852 and from 1865 to 1869. He was admitted to the Irish Privy Council in 1848.

In 1869, he was raised to the peerage as Baron Castletown, of Upper Ossory, reviving an ancient title that had belonged to the FitzPatricks around 1500. Apart from his parliamentary career he was also Lord Lieutenant of Queen's County from 1855 to 1883.

== Family ==
Lord Castletown married Augusta Mary Douglas, daughter of Reverend Archibald Douglas, in 1830. They had one son and six daughters.

- Hon. Bernard (1848–1937), succeeded as second baron
- Hon. Gertrude (died 26 January 1912), married in 1862 Edward Randal Skeffington-Smyth
- Hon. Augusta Frederica Anne (died 24 February 1903), married in 1861, Lt.-Col. Hon. Thomas Vesey Dawson, son of Lord Cremorne, killed in action at the Battle of Inkerman. She married secondly in 1856 Charles Magniac.
- Hon. Florence Virginia Fox (died 5 March 1912), married in 1838 Gen. Sir George Higginson
- Hon. Cecilia Emily Emma (died Oct/Nov 1918, buried Nov 8th 1918 at St.John's, Hove.), married in 1868 Hon. Lewis Strange Wingfield
- Hon. Edith Susan Esther (died 1 December 1906), married in 1862, as his second wife, Sir Charles Murray
- Hon. Olivia Douglas Amy (died 22 May 1893), married in 1869 Sir John Sebright, 9th Baronet

He died in 1883, aged 71, just four months after the death of his only sister, Lady Lyvedon. Lady Castletown died in 1899.

Lord Castletown was succeeded in the barony by his only son, Bernard, who died without heirs in 1937, at which time the barony became extinct.

Parliament of the United Kingdom
Preceded by Sir Charles Coote; Thomas Vesey	Member of Parliament for Queen's County; 1837–1841; With: Sir Charles Coote	Succeeded by Sir Charles Coote; Thomas Vesey
Preceded by Sir Charles Coote; Thomas Vesey	Member of Parliament for Queen's County; 1847–1852; With: Thomas Vesey	Succeeded by Michael Dunne; Sir Charles Coote
Preceded by Michael Dunne; Francis Plunkett Dunne	Member of Parliament for Queen's County; 1865–1869; With: Francis Plunkett Dunne 1865–1868; Kenelm Digby 1868–1869	Succeeded by Kenelm Digby; Edmund Dease
Honorary titles
Preceded by The Viscount de Vesci	Lord Lieutenant of Queen's County; 1855–1883	Succeeded by The Viscount de Vesci
Peerage of the United Kingdom
New creation	Baron Castletown; 1869–1883	Succeeded by Bernard Fitzpatrick
