= Lewis Strange Wingfield =

Irish actor, painter & writer (1842–1891)

Lewis Strange Wingfield (February 25, 1842 – November 12, 1891) was an Irish traveller, actor, writer, and painter.

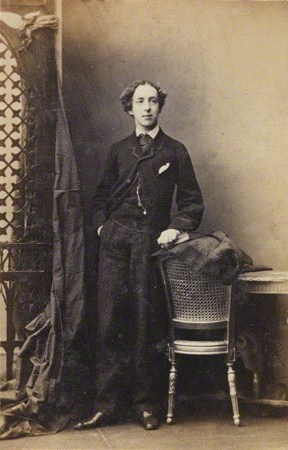
Lewis Strange Wingfield, 1861 photograph

== Life ==
The third and youngest son of Richard Wingfield, 6th Viscount Powerscourt, by his wife, Lady Elizabeth Frances Charlotte, eldest daughter of Robert Jocelyn, 3rd Earl of Roden, he was born on 25 February 1842, and educated at Eton College and Bonn University. He was intended for the army, but gave up the career at the request of his mother, after her second marriage to Frederick Stewart, 4th Marquess of Londonderry the Marchioness of Londonderry. He then had many occupations.

== Actor ==
On 21 August 1865 Wingfield was at the Haymarket Theatre Roderigo to the Othello of Ira Aldridge, the Iago of Walter Montgomery, and the Desdemona of Madge Robertson. He had previously played in the burlesque Ixion (F. C. Burnand). Reputed adventures were going to The Derby in blackface, spending nights in workhouses and pauper lodgings, and becoming an attendant in a lunatic asylum and prison.

== Journalist ==
During the Franco-Prussian War Wingfield went to Paris, where he stayed through the siege, attending the wounded and qualifying as a surgeon. During the siege he communicated by balloon and otherwise with The Times, the Daily Telegraph, and other newspapers. After returning to London he went back to Paris immediately on hearing of the Paris Commune, and remained there until its suppression by French troops.

== Artist ==
Having taken a house, No. 8 Maida Vale, with a large studio attached, Wingfield concentrated on painting, and became a member of the Royal Hibernian Academy. Between 1869 and 1875 he exhibited four domestic scenes at the Royal Academy, and one at the Suffolk Street Gallery. He planned during his stay in Paris for a panorama of the siege to be exhibited in London, and forwarded to England designs executed by various French artists. The failure of an American financier brought the scheme to nothing.

== Theatrical designer ==
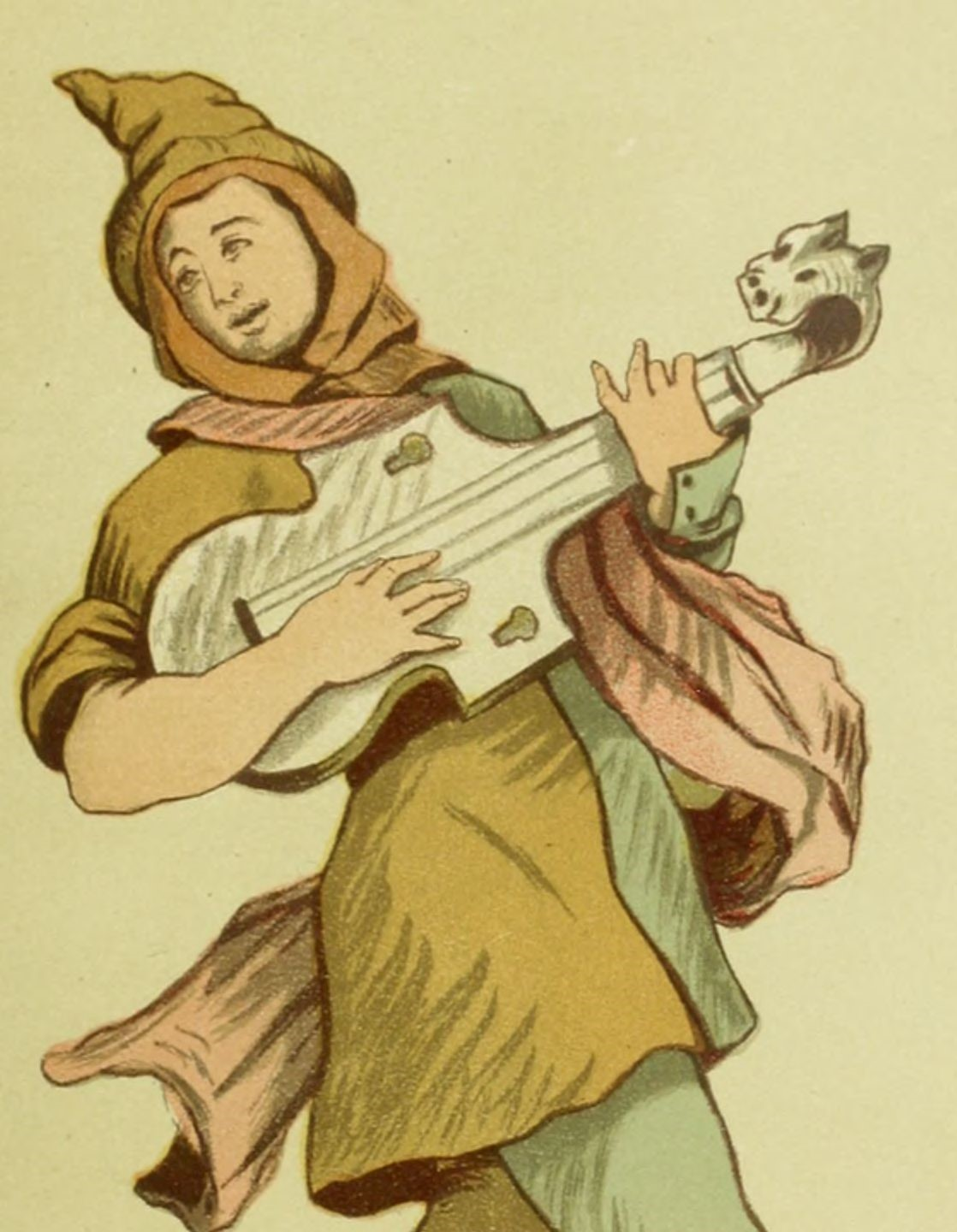
Illustration from an 1884 costume book by Wingfield showing a jester or entertainer in the time of Edward I (c. 1307), playing a citole.

After abandoning painting, Wingfield took to designing costumes for the theatre, and was responsible for the dressing of Shakespearean revivals, including Romeo and Juliet at the Lyceum Theatre for Mary Anderson, and Antony and Cleopatra at the Princess's Theatre for Lily Langtry. For a time Wingfield contributed theatrical criticisms to The Globe newspaper, as "Whyte Tyghe".

== Traveller, and last years ==
Wingfield was one of the first Britons to journey into the interior of China, in 1880, visiting Hong Kong, Fuzhou, Shanghai, Suzhou, Tianjin with side trips. He went on to Tokyo, and brought home a life-size figure of a mounted Japanese soldier in armour.

Wingfield also worked as a war correspondent, embedded with the military staff. He joined the British Army in the Sudan in 1884, but was then long in hospital in Egypt, and never quite regained his health. He voyaged to Australia; and died at 14 Montague Place, London (where he had moved from Mecklenburgh Square), on 12 November 1891, and was buried in Kensal Green cemetery.

== Works ==
Wingfield's first published work was Under the Palms in Algeria and Tunis, 1868, 2 vols. For Helena Modjeska he adapted Schiller's play Mary Stuart, produced at the Royal Court Theatre on 9 October 1880. He also wrote some unacted dramas. He published in various literary genres (some of these works reached second editions):

- Slippery Ground, a novel in 3 vols., appeared in 1876;
- Lady Grizzle: an Impression of a momentous Epoch, 1878, 3 vols.;
- My Lords of Strogue: a Chronicle of Ireland from the Convention to the Union, 1879, 3 vols.;
- For Good or Evil appeared in Eros; Four Tales, vol. i. 1880;
- In Her Majesty's Keeping, 1880, 3 vols.;
- Gehenna, or Havens of Unrest, 1882, 3 vols.;
- Abigail Rowe: a Chronicle of the Regency’ 1883, 3 vols.;
- Notes on Civil Costume in England, 1884;
- Barbara Philpot: a Study of Manners, 1886, 3 vols.;
- Lovely Wang: a Bit of China, 1887;
- The Curse of Koshin: a Romance, 1888;
- Wanderings of a Globe-trotter in the Far East, 1889; and
- The Maid of Honour: a Tale of the Dark Days of France, 1891, 3 vols.

Wingfield was also responsible for Her English Dress, lectures issued by the International Health Exhibition, 1884.

== Family ==
Wingfield married, on 16 June 1868, Cecilia Emma, fourth daughter and fifth child of John Wilson Fitzpatrick, 1st Baron Castletown.

== Notes ==
Attribution

- This article incorporates text from a publication now in the public domain: Lee, Sidney, ed. (1900). "Wingfield, Lewis Strange". Dictionary of National Biography. Vol. 62. London: Smith, Elder & Co.
