= Bernard FitzPatrick, 2nd Baron Castletown =

British politician

The Right Honourable The Lord Castletown KP CMG PC (Ire)
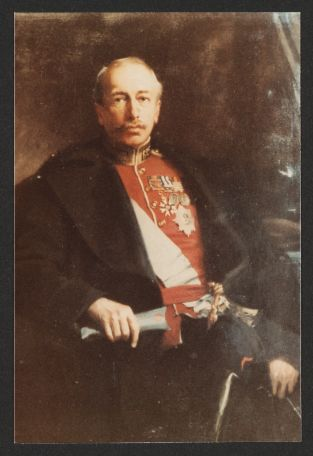
- Lord Castletown

Member of Parliament for Portarlington
- In office 1880–1883

High Sheriff of Queen's County
- In office 1876

Personal details
- Born: 29 July 1848; London, England
- Died: 29 May 1937 (aged 88); Queen's County, Ireland
- Political party: Conservative
- Spouse: Emily St Leger (m. 1874)
- Parent: John FitzPatrick (father)
- Education: Brasenose College, Oxford
- Military career
- Service: Life Guards
- Rank: Lieutenant-Colonel
- Commands: 4th Battalion of the Leinster Regiment

Arms of Bernard FitzPatrick, 2nd Baron Castletown:Sable a saltire argent, on a chief azure three fleur-de-lis or, all within a bordure wavy of the second

Bernard Edward Barnaby FitzPatrick, 2nd Baron Castletown, KP, CMG, PC (I) (29 July 1848 – 29 May 1937) was an Anglo-Irish soldier and Conservative Member of Parliament.

== Biography ==
=== Life ===
Castletown was the only son of John FitzPatrick, 1st Baron Castletown, and his wife Augusta Mary (née Douglas). He had six sisters. He was educated at Eton and Brasenose College, Oxford, where he took second-class honours in Law and Modern History. He made the Grand Tour, then in fashion for eldest sons of the aristocracy, and viewed fighting during the Franco-Prussian War.

He was appointed High Sheriff of Queen's County in 1876, and sat as Member of Parliament for Portarlington from 1880 to 1883, when he succeeded his father in the barony and entered the House of Lords.

He served in the Life Guards and fought in Egypt in 1882. After he resigned from active service, he was appointed to the Reserve of Officers in 1886, serving as a volunteer officer until reaching the age limit in March 1900. He was promoted major on 8 June 1896, and later lieutenant colonel in command of the 4th (Queen's County Militia) Battalion, Prince of Wales's Leinster Regiment (Royal Canadians) from October 1899, and was the first to outfit them with Irish bagpipers. In February 1900, he left for South Africa, where he was posted on special service during the Second Boer War, as Acting Assistant Adjutant-General on the HQ staff. In recognition of services during the war, he was appointed a Companion of the Order of St Michael and St George (CMG) in the South African Honours list published on 26 June 1902.

In early 1902, he took part in a special diplomatic mission to promote British interests in Morocco.

Along with Theodore Roosevelt and Douglas Hyde and others, he was elected honorary Vice President of the Irish Literary Society of New York in 1903. In 1905, he proposed a tillage farming plan along the lines of Ireland's old clan system. Castletown was later Chancellor of the Royal University of Ireland between 1906 and 1910.

=== Theft of the Irish Crown Jewels ===
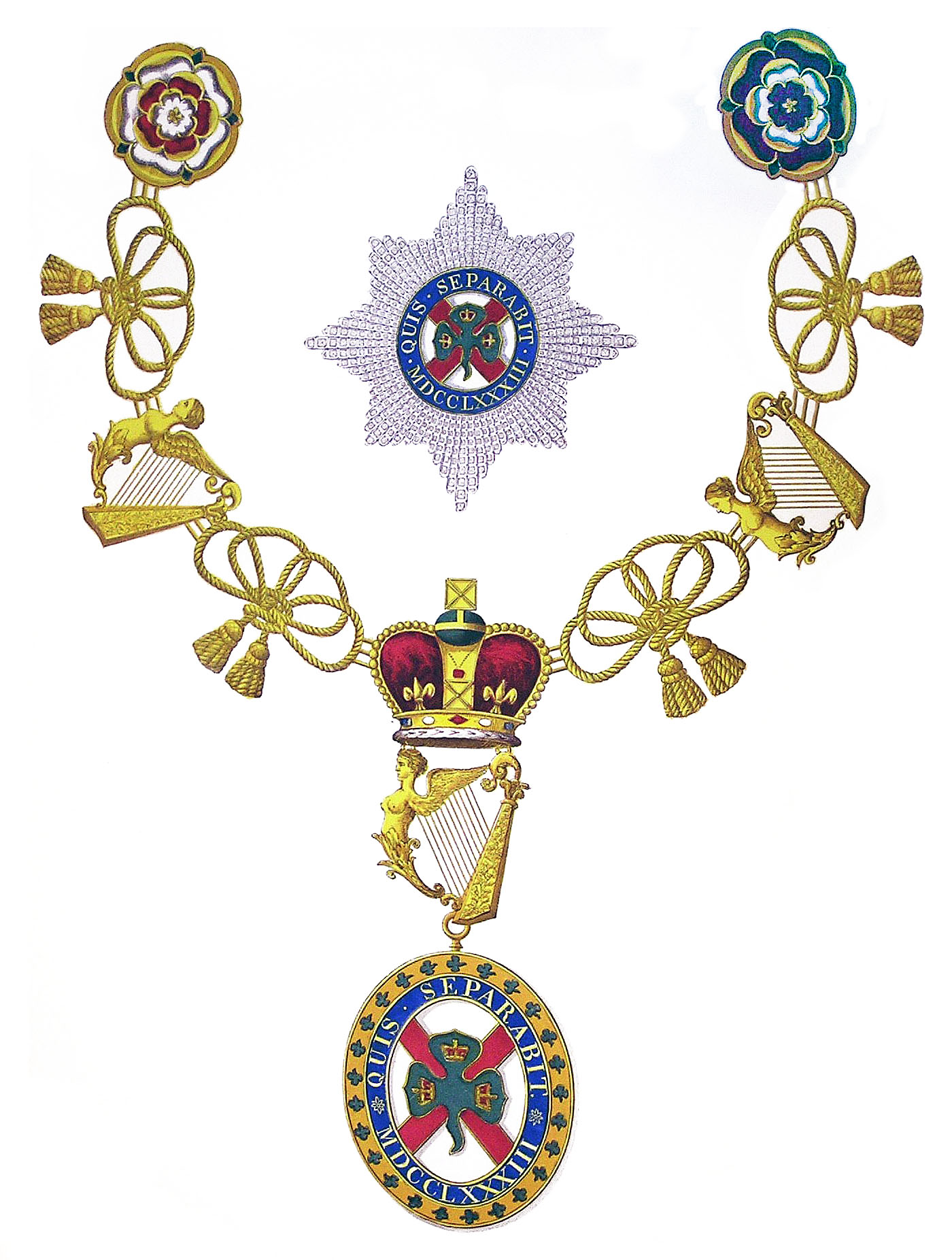
An illustration of the insignia of a Knight of St Patrick

The Irish Crown Jewels were discovered missing on 6 July 1907, four days before the start of a visit to the Irish International Exhibition by King Edward VII and Queen Alexandra, at which was planned the investiture of Bernard FitzPatrick, 2nd Baron Castletown into the Order. The theft is reported to have angered the King, but the visit went ahead. However, the investiture ceremony was cancelled. Also stolen were the collars of five Knight Members of the Order. The following year in 1908 he was made a Knight of the Order of St Patrick and admitted to the Irish Privy Council. His banner still hangs in St. Patrick's Hall in Dublin Castle.

=== Family and Death ===
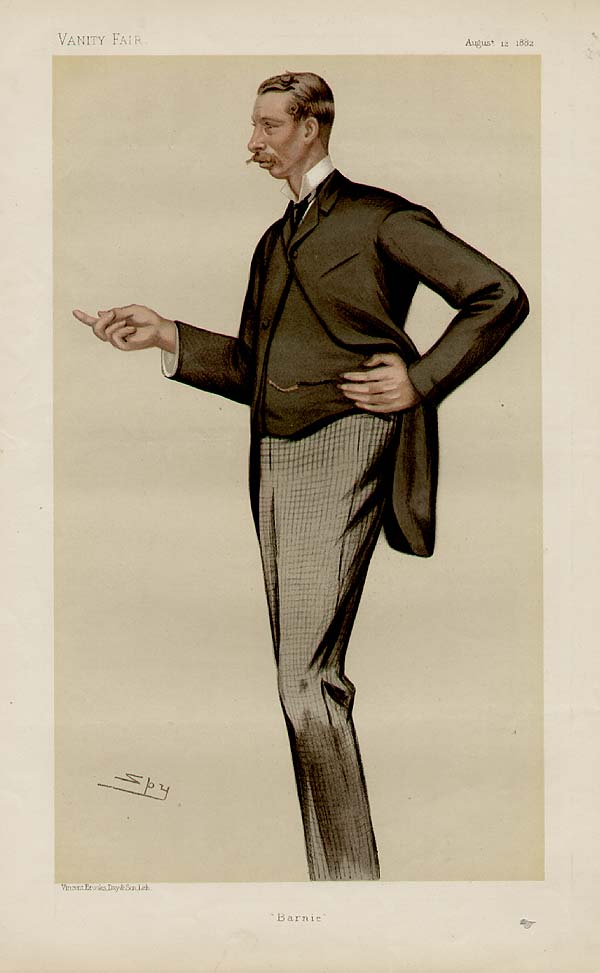
1882 Spy caricature of the 2nd Lord Castletown in Vanity Fair.

Lord Castletown married the Hon. Emily Ursula Clare St Leger, daughter of the 4th Viscount Doneraile, in 1874. The marriage was childless. Lady Castletown joined her husband in South Africa in early 1900, when he was posted there during the Second Boer War.

He died on 29 May 1937 at Granston Manor, aged 87, when the barony became extinct.

Castletown was particularly interested in Celtic heritage, and was among the founders of the Celtic Association, an organisation concerned with the preservation of the languages, literature, music, dress and customs of the Celtic peoples. In 1900, the Celtic Association was set up in Dublin with Castletown as president and E.E. Fournier as secretary. The Celtic Association is mainly remembered for the three Pan-Celtic Congresses it organized: the first in Dublin in 1901, the second in Caernarfon in 1904, and the last in Edinburgh in 1907. The first Congress had been scheduled for 1900, but had to be postponed when Castletown was called to service in the Boer War. The Association was not without its detractors, in part because many of the Irish sympathized with the Boers.

Originally made up of representatives from Ireland, Scotland, Wales, Brittany, and the Isle of Man; Cornwall was added in 1904.

Parliament of the United Kingdom
Preceded by Lionel Dawson-Damer	Member of Parliament for Portarlington; 1880–1883	Succeeded by Robert French-Brewster
Peerage of the United Kingdom
Preceded by John FitzPatrick	Baron Castletown; 1883–1937	Extinct
