= Michael Dunne (MP) =

Irish politician (1800–1876)

Member of Parliament for Queen's County
- In office 19 July 1852 – 22 July 1865 Serving with Francis Plunkett Dunne (1859–1865); Charles Coote (1852–1859)
- Preceded by: John FitzPatrick; Thomas Vesey
- Succeeded by: John FitzPatrick; Francis Plunkett Dunne

Personal details
- Born: 1800
- Died: 20 September 1876 (aged 75–76)
- Party: Liberal/Whig
- Other political affiliations: Independent Irish

Michael Dunne (1800 – 20 September 1876) was an Irish Liberal, Whig and Independent Irish Party politician.

He was a farmer and lived in Ballymanus, Stradbally, Queen's County, a house and land the family rented from the Grattans. Michael's son William Dunne (1843-1915) was a racehorse trainer and bred two consecutive Irish Derby winners (Soulouque in 1879 and King of the Bees in 1880) and Cortolvin who went on to win the 1867 Grand National.

Michael was a Justice of the Peace.

Dunne became an Independent Irish Party MP for Queen's County at the 1852 general election and, standing as a Whig in 1857 and a Liberal in 1859, held the seat until 1865 when he did not seek re-election.

Parliament of the United Kingdom
Preceded by John FitzPatrick; Thomas Vesey	Member of Parliament for Queen's County; 1852–1865; With: Francis Plunkett Dunne (1859–1865); Charles Coote (1852–1859)	Succeeded by John FitzPatrick; Francis Plunkett Dunne
