= Queen's County (UK Parliament constituency) =

UK parliamentary constituency in Ireland, 1801–1885

- Former county constituency for the House of Commons
- County: Queen's County

1801–1885
- Seats: 2
- Created from: Queen's County (IHC)
- Replaced by: Queen's County Leix and Queen's County Ossory

1918–1922
- Seats: 1
- Created from: Queen's County Leix and Queen's County Ossory (IHC)
- Replaced by: Leix–Offaly

Queen's County was a UK Parliament constituency in Ireland, returning two Members of Parliament from 1801 to 1885 and one from 1918 to 1922.

== Boundaries ==
This constituency comprised the whole of Queen's County, now known as County Laois, except for the parliamentary borough of Portarlington 1801–1885.

== Members of Parliament ==
=== MPs 1801–1885 ===
Year	1st Member	1st Party	2nd Member	2nd Party
1801	Sir John Parnell, Bt		Charles Coote	
1801, 28 December	Hon. William Wellesley-Pole	Tory	Charles Coote	
1802, 5 April	Hon. William Wellesley-Pole	Tory	Henry Parnell	Whig
1802, 23 July	Hon. William Wellesley-Pole	Tory	Sir Eyre Coote	
1806, 17 February	Hon. William Wellesley-Pole	Tory	Sir Henry Parnell	Whig
1821, 27 August	Sir Charles Coote, Bt	Tory	Sir Henry Parnell	Whig
1832, 24 December	Sir Charles Coote, Bt	Tory	Patrick Lalor	Repeal Association
1834, 18 December	Sir Charles Coote, Bt	Conservative	Patrick Lalor	Repeal Association
1835, 20 January	Sir Charles Coote, Bt	Conservative	Hon. Thomas Vesey	Conservative
1837, 15 August	Sir Charles Coote, Bt	Conservative	John FitzPatrick	Whig
1841, 10 July	Sir Charles Coote, Bt	Conservative	Hon. Thomas Vesey	Conservative
1847, 7 August	John FitzPatrick	Whig	Hon. Thomas Vesey	Conservative
1852, 19 July	Michael Dunne	Ind. Irish	Sir Charles Coote, Bt	Conservative
1857, 11 April	Michael Dunne	Whig	Sir Charles Coote, Bt	Conservative
1859, 10 May	Michael Dunne	Liberal	Francis Plunkett Dunne	Conservative
1865, 22 July	John FitzPatrick	Liberal	Francis Plunkett Dunne	Conservative
1868, 23 November	John FitzPatrick	Liberal	Kenelm Thomas Digby	Liberal
1870, 4 January	Edmund Dease	Liberal	Kenelm Thomas Digby	Liberal
1874, 7 February	Edmund Dease	Home Rule League	Kenelm Thomas Digby	Home Rule League
1880, 8 April	Richard Lalor	Parnellite Home Rule League	Arthur O'Connor	Parnellite Home Rule League
1885	Constituency divided: see Queen's County Leix and Queen's County Ossory			

=== MPs 1918–1922 ===
Election	Member	Party	Note
1918	Single member constituency created		
1918, 14 December ^{1}	Kevin O'Higgins	Sinn Féin	Did not take his seat at Westminster
1922, 26 October	UK constituency abolished		

Note:-

- ^{1} Date of polling day. The result was declared on 28 December 1918, to allow time for votes cast by members of the armed forces to be included in the count.

== Elections ==
=== Elections in the 1830s ===
General election 1830: Queen's County
Party	Candidate	Votes	%
Tory	Charles Coote	Unopposed	
Whig	Henry Parnell	Unopposed	
Tory hold			
Whig hold			

Parnell was appointed as Secretary of State for War, requiring a by-election.

By-election, 16 April 1831: Queen's County
Party	Candidate	Votes	%
Whig	Henry Parnell	Unopposed	
Whig hold			

General election 1831: Queen's County
Party	Candidate	Votes	%
Whig	Henry Parnell	393	43.9
Tory	Charles Coote	312	34.9
Whig	Thomas Brown Kelly	190	21.2
Turnout		c. 448	c. 37.8
Registered electors		1,184	
Majority		81	9.0
Whig hold			
Majority		122	13.7
Tory hold			

General election 1832: Queen's County
Party	Candidate	Votes	%	±%
Repeal	Patrick Lalor	772	35.6	New
Tory	Charles Coote	694	32.0	−2.9
Repeal	Peter Gale	683	31.5	New
Whig	Edward Dunne	18	0.8	−64.3
Turnout		1,380	93.8	c. +56.0
Registered electors		1,471		
Majority		754	34.8	N/A
Repeal gain from Whig				
Majority		11	0.5	−13.2
Tory hold				

General election 1835: Queen's County
Party	Candidate	Votes	%	±%
Conservative	Charles Coote	787	28.2	+12.2
Conservative	Thomas Vesey	695	24.9	+8.9
Repeal (Whig)	Patrick Lalor	673	24.2	−11.4
Repeal (Whig)	Robert Cassidy	631	22.6	−8.9
Majority		22	0.7	+0.2
Turnout		1,445	85.4	−8.4
Registered electors		1,692		
Conservative hold		Swing		
Conservative gain from Repeal		Swing		

General election 1837: Queen's County
Party	Candidate	Votes	%	±%
Conservative	Charles Coote	1,224	39.4	+11.2
Whig	John FitzPatrick	943	30.4	N/A
Conservative	Thomas Vesey	894	28.8	+3.9
Conservative	Sir Charles Henry Coote, 10th Baronet	40	1.3	N/A
Whig	John Michael Henry Fock, 3rd Baron de Robeck	4	0.1	N/A
Turnout		1,885	78.6	−6.8
Registered electors		2,397		
Majority		281	9.0	+8.3
Conservative hold				
Majority		49	1.6	N/A
Whig gain from Conservative				

=== Elections in the 1840s ===
General election 1841: Queen's County
Party	Candidate	Votes	%	±%
Conservative	Charles Coote	Unopposed		
Conservative	Thomas Vesey	Unopposed		
Registered electors		1,657		
Conservative hold				
Conservative gain from Whig				

General election 1847: Queen's County
Party	Candidate	Votes	%	±%
Conservative	Thomas Vesey	Unopposed		
Whig	John FitzPatrick	Unopposed		
Registered electors		1,166		
Conservative hold				
Whig gain from Conservative				

=== Elections in the 1850s ===
General election 1852: Queen's County
Party	Candidate	Votes	%	±%
Conservative	Charles Coote	Unopposed		
Independent Irish	Michael Dunne	Unopposed		
Registered electors		2,727		
Conservative hold				
Independent Irish gain from Whig				

General election 1857: Queen's County
Party	Candidate	Votes	%	±%
Conservative	Charles Coote	1,850	41.0	N/A
Whig	Michael Dunne	1,424	31.6	N/A
Whig	John FitzPatrick	1,239	27.5	N/A
Majority		611	13.5	N/A
Turnout		2,257 (est)	66.0 (est)	N/A
Registered electors		3,419		
Conservative hold		Swing	N/A	
Whig gain from Independent Irish		Swing	N/A	

General election 1859: Queen's County
Party	Candidate	Votes	%	±%
Conservative	Francis Plunkett Dunne	Unopposed		
Liberal	Michael Dunne	Unopposed		
Registered electors		3,489		
Conservative hold				
Liberal hold				

=== Elections in the 1860s ===
General election 1865: Queen's County
Party	Candidate	Votes	%	±%
Conservative	Francis Plunkett Dunne	1,800	42.5	N/A
Liberal	John FitzPatrick	1,515	35.8	N/A
Liberal	Patrick McDonald	916	21.6	N/A
Majority		285	6.7	N/A
Turnout		3,016 (est)	87.7 (est)	N/A
Registered electors		3,438		
Conservative hold		Swing	N/A	
Liberal hold		Swing	N/A	

General election 1868: Queen's County
Party	Candidate	Votes	%	±%
Liberal	John FitzPatrick	Unopposed		
Liberal	Kenelm Thomas Digby	Unopposed		
Registered electors		3,726		
Liberal hold				
Liberal gain from Conservative				

=== Elections in the 1870s ===
FitzPatrick was made Lord Castletown, causing a by-election.

By-election, 4 Jan 1870: Queen's County
Party	Candidate	Votes	%	±%
Liberal	Edmund Dease	Unopposed		
Liberal hold				

4358

General election 1874: Queen's County
Party	Candidate	Votes	%	±%
Home Rule	Kenelm Thomas Digby	1,726	39.6	New
Home Rule	Edmund Dease	1,639	37.6	N/A
Liberal	George Dunne	993	22.8	N/A
Majority		646	14.8	N/A
Turnout		2,676 (est)	74.5 (est)	N/A
Registered electors		3,593		
Home Rule gain from Liberal		Swing	N/A	
Home Rule gain from Liberal		Swing	N/A	

=== Elections in the 1880s ===
General election 1880: Queen's County
Party	Candidate	Votes	%	±%
Parnellite Home Rule League	Richard Lalor	1,686	39.8	N/A
Parnellite Home Rule League	Arthur O'Connor	1,545	36.4	N/A
Conservative	Robert Ashworth Godolphin Cosby	899	21.2	New
Home Rule	Kenelm Thomas Digby	109	2.6	−37.0
Majority		646	15.2	+0.4
Turnout		2,585 (est)	81.0 (est)	+6.5
Registered electors		3,190		
Home Rule hold		Swing		
Home Rule hold		Swing		

=== Elections in the 1910s ===
1918 general election: Queen's County
Party	Candidate	Votes	%	±%
Sinn Féin	Kevin O'Higgins	13,452	67.5	
Irish Parliamentary	Patrick Meehan	6,480	32.5	
Majority		6,972	35.0	
Turnout		19,932	76.5	
Registered electors		26,063		
Sinn Féin win (new seat)				
