= Francis Plunkett Dunne =

Irish landowner, British Army officer, and politician

Major-General The Right Honourable Francis Plunkett Dunne
- Born: c. 1802
- Died: 6 July 1874
- Allegiance: United Kingdom
- Branch: British Army
- Rank: Major-General
- Awards: Privy Counsellor of Ireland (1866); Order of St Saviour (Greece)
- Other work: Politician

Major-General Francis Plunkett Dunne, PC(Ire) (died 1874) was an Irish landowner, officer in the British Army, and member of Parliament of the United Kingdom, where he was sometimes known as 'the Honourable Member for the Army' because of his staunch support of the military.

== Family ==
Francis Plunkett Dunne was the eldest son of General Edward Dunne (1767–1844) of Brittas, Queen's County (now County Laois), by his wife Frances White, sister of the 1st Earl of Bantry.

Dunne was educated at Trinity College, Dublin and the Senior Department of the Royal Military College, Sandhurst (the Senior Department was the predecessor of the Staff College).

== Military career ==
Dunne was commissioned (by purchase) as a Cornet in the 7th Dragoon Guards in 1823, and purchased promotions to Lieutenant in 1825 and Captain in 1826. Shortly after the latter promotion he was placed on half pay, but exchanged into the 10th Foot in 1829, serving with that regiment for the remainder of his active career. For much of that time the 10th was stationed in the Ionian Islands, and Dunne was awarded the Order of St Saviour of Greece. In 1840 Dunne was promoted to be an unattached Major on the half-pay list: he never returned to full pay, but he did receive periodic brevet promotions: Lieutenant-Colonel in 1851, Colonel in 1854, and Major-General in 1865. He was also Lieutenant-Colonel Commandant and later Honorary Colonel of the Queen's County Militia.

== Political career ==
Dunne sat as Member of Parliament for the Irish constituency of Portarlington from 1847 to 1857, and held the office of Clerk of the Ordnance 1852–53. As a backbencher he frequently took a leading role in debates on military issues, and was sometimes jokingly referred to as 'the Honourable Member for the Army'. He was private secretary to the Lord Lieutenant of Ireland, the Earl of Eglinton, in 1858–59, and afterwards returned to the Westminster Parliament as MP for Queen's County 1859–68. He was appointed a member of the Privy Council of Ireland in 1866. He stood unsuccessfully for re-election for Queen's County in 1874, but died shortly afterwards.

== Brittas Castle ==
In 1869 Dunne rebuilt Brittas Castle to a design by the architect John McCurdy. The castellated house was destroyed by fire in 1942. The ruined tower still stands.

== Death ==
Francis Plunkett Dunne died unmarried on 6 July 1874 and was succeeded in his estates by his brother Edward Meadows Dunne.

== Notes ==
Parliament of the United Kingdom
Preceded by George Dawson-Damer	Member of Parliament for Portarlington; 1847–1857	Succeeded by Lionel Dawson-Damer
Preceded by Michael Dunne; Sir Charles Coote	Member of Parliament for Queen's County; 1859–1868; With: Michael Dunne 1859–1865; John Fitzpatrick 1865–1868	Succeeded by John Fitzpatrick; Kenelm Digby
Military offices
Preceded by George Anson	Clerk of the Ordnance; 1852–1853	Succeeded by William Monsell
