= Portarlington (UK Parliament constituency) =

UK parliamentary constituency in Ireland, 1801–1885

- Former borough constituency for the House of Commons
- County: Queen's County
- Borough: Portarlington

1801–1885
- Seats: 1
- Created from: Portarlington (IHC)
- Replaced by: King's County Tullamore; Queen's County Leix

Portarlington was a rotten borough and was a United Kingdom Parliament constituency in Ireland, returning one MP from 1801 to 1885. It was an original constituency represented in Parliament when the Union of Great Britain and Ireland took effect on 1 January 1801.

== History and boundaries ==
This constituency was the parliamentary borough of Portarlington in Queen's County (renamed County Laois in 1920).

A report into the boundaries was undertaken in 1831. The Parliamentary Boundaries (Ireland) Act 1832 defined the boundaries of the parliamentary borough as:

From the Bridge over the Grand Canal on the Monastereven Road, along the Canal to the Bridge over the same on the Maryborough Road; thence in a straight Line to the Point called Butler's Ford, at which a small Stream crosses the Mountmellick Road; thence in a straight Line to a small Bridge on the Cloniquin Road, which is distant about Five hundred Yards (measured along the Cloniquin Road) to the West of the Point at which the same leaves the Mountmellick Road; thence in a straight Line to a Point on the Bog Road which is distant Five hundred Yards (measured along the Bog Road) to the West of the Point at which the same leaves the Rathangan Road; thence, Eastward, along the Bog Road to the Point at which the same joins the Rathangan Road; thence, Southward, along the Rathangan Road to the Bridge on the same over the River Barrow; thence along the River Barrow to that Point thereof which would be cut by a straight Line to be drawn thereto due North from the Bridge over the Canal on the Monastereven Road; thence in a straight Line to the said Bridge on the Monastereven Road.

It was disfranchised under the Redistribution of Seats Act 1885, which took effect at the 1885 general election.

== Members of Parliament ==
Notable MPs included Hon. William Lamb, who, as Viscount Melbourne, served as prime minister briefly in 1834 and again from 1835 to 1841.

Election	Member	Party
1801	Frederick Trench	
March 1801	William Elliot	
July 1802	Henry Parnell	Whig
December 1802	Thomas Tyrwhitt	
March 1806	John Langston	
November 1806	Sir Oswald Mosley, Bt	
1807	Hon. William Lamb	Whig
1812	Arthur Shakespeare	
1816	Richard Sharp	Whig
1819	David Ricardo	Whig
1824	James Farquhar	Tory
1830	Sir Charles Ogle, Bt	Tory
1831	Sir William Rae, Bt	Tory
1832	Thomas Gladstone	Tory
1834	Thomas Gladstone	Conservative
1835	George Dawson-Damer	Conservative
1846	George Dawson-Damer	Peelite
1847	Francis Plunkett Dunne	Whig
1852	Francis Plunkett Dunne	Conservative
1857	Lionel Dawson-Damer	Conservative
1865	James Anthony Lawson	Liberal
1868	Lionel Dawson-Damer	Conservative
1880	Bernard FitzPatrick	Conservative
1883	Robert French-Brewster	Conservative
1885	constituency abolished	

== Elections ==
=== Elections in the 1830s ===
General election 1830: Portarlington
Party	Candidate	Votes	%
Tory	Charles Ogle	Unopposed	
Registered electors		15	
Tory hold			

General election 1831: Portarlington
Party	Candidate	Votes	%
Tory	William Rae	Unopposed	
Registered electors		15	
Tory hold			

General election 1832: Portarlington
Party	Candidate	Votes	%
Tory	Thomas Gladstone	66	50.4
Tory	George Dawson-Damer	65	49.6
Majority		1	0.8
Turnout		131	95.6
Registered electors		137	
Tory hold			

General election 1835: Portarlington
Party	Candidate	Votes	%
Conservative	George Dawson-Damer	Unopposed	
Registered electors		156	
Conservative hold			

General election 1837: Portarlington
Party	Candidate	Votes	%
Conservative	George Dawson-Damer	80	55.2
Whig	Francis Plunkett Dunne	65	44.8
Majority		15	10.4
Turnout		145	66.8
Registered electors		217	
Conservative hold			

=== Elections in the 1840s ===
General election 1841: Portarlington
Party	Candidate	Votes	%	±%
Conservative	George Dawson-Damer	Unopposed		
Registered electors		188		
Conservative hold				

Dawson-Damer was appointed Comptroller of the Household, requiring a by-election.

By-election, 27 September 1841: Portarlington
Party	Candidate	Votes	%	±%
Conservative	George Dawson-Damer	Unopposed		
Conservative hold				

General election 1847: Portarlington
Party	Candidate	Votes	%	±%
Whig	Francis Plunkett Dunne	Unopposed		
Registered electors		221		
Whig gain from Conservative				

=== Elections in the 1850s ===
Dunne was appointed Clerk of the Ordnance, requiring a by-election.

By-election, 8 March 1852: Portarlington
Party	Candidate	Votes	%	±%
Conservative	Francis Plunkett Dunne	Unopposed		
Conservative gain from Whig				

General election 1852: Portarlington
Party	Candidate	Votes	%	±%
Conservative	Francis Plunkett Dunne	Unopposed		
Registered electors		71		
Conservative gain from Whig				

General election 1857: Portarlington
Party	Candidate	Votes	%	±%
Conservative	Lionel Dawson-Damer	42	53.8	N/A
Conservative	Francis Plunkett Dunne	36	46.2	N/A
Majority		6	7.6	N/A
Turnout		78	83.9	N/A
Registered electors		93		
Conservative hold		Swing	N/A	

General election 1859: Portarlington
Party	Candidate	Votes	%	±%
Conservative	Lionel Dawson-Damer	Unopposed		
Registered electors		99		
Conservative hold				

=== Elections in the 1860s ===
General election 1865: Portarlington
Party	Candidate	Votes	%	±%
Liberal	James Anthony Lawson	46	56.8	New
Conservative	Lionel Dawson-Damer	35	43.2	N/A
Majority		11	13.6	N/A
Turnout		81	76.4	N/A
Registered electors		106		
Liberal gain from Conservative		Swing	N/A	

General election 1868: Portarlington
Party	Candidate	Votes	%	±%
Conservative	Lionel Dawson-Damer	69	57.5	+14.3
Liberal	James Anthony Lawson	51	42.5	−14.3
Majority		18	15.0	N/A
Turnout		120	89.6	+13.2
Registered electors		134		
Conservative gain from Liberal		Swing	+14.3	

=== Elections in the 1870s ===
General election 1874: Portarlington
Party	Candidate	Votes	%	±%
Conservative	Lionel Dawson-Damer	76	59.4	+1.9
Liberal	William D Barnett	52	40.6	−1.9
Majority		24	18.8	+3.8
Turnout		128	94.1	+4.5
Registered electors		136		
Conservative hold		Swing	+1.9	

=== Elections in the 1880s ===
General election 1880: Portarlington
Party	Candidate	Votes	%	±%
Conservative	Bernard FitzPatrick	116	86.6	+27.2
Liberal	Robert Keating Clay	18	13.4	−27.2
Majority		98	73.2	+54.4
Turnout		134	91.2	−2.9
Registered electors		147		
Conservative hold		Swing	+27.2	

FitzPatrick succeeded to the peerage, becoming Lord Castletown, causing a by-election.

By-election, 28 Feb 1883: Portarlington
Party	Candidate	Votes	%	±%
Conservative	Robert French-Brewster	70	55.1	−31.5
Liberal	Thomas Mayne	57	44.9	+31.5
Majority		13	10.2	−63.0
Turnout		127	92.0	+0.8
Registered electors		138		
Conservative hold		Swing	−31.5	

== See also ==
- Portarlington (Parliament of Ireland constituency)
