= Thomas Vesey =

Thomas Vesey may refer to:

- Sir Thomas Vesey, 1st Baronet (1668?–1730), Irish clergyman
- Thomas Vesey, 1st Viscount de Vesci (died 1804), Anglo-Irish peer
- Thomas Vesey, 3rd Viscount de Vesci (1803–1875), Irish peer and Conservative politician
- Thomas Vesey, 7th Viscount de Vesci (born 1955)
- Thomas Vesey (archdeacon), Archdeacon of Armagh
