= Abbeyleix House =

Country house, County Laois, Ireland

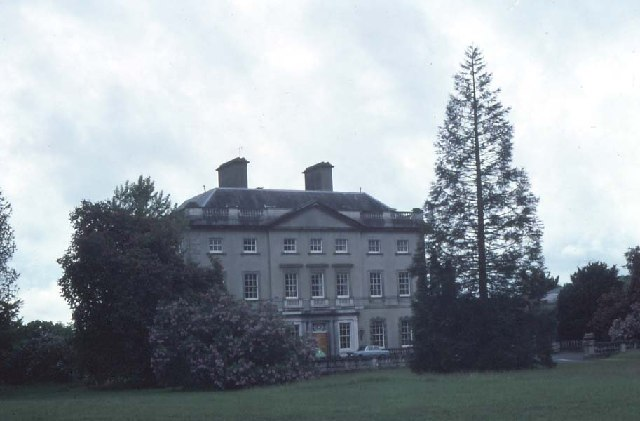
- Abbeyleix House in the 1980s

- Location within Ireland

General information
- Status: Private dwelling house
- Type: House
- Architectural style: Georgian, Classical
- Location: Abbeyleix, County Laois, Abbeyleix, Ireland
- Coordinates: 52.8962°N 7.3750°W
- Elevation: 100 m (330 ft)
- Groundbreaking: 1773
- Owner: John Collison

Technical details
- Material: Originally brick front and later rendered over
- Floor count: 4
- Floor area: 2,500 m^{2} (27,000 sq ft)
- Grounds: 453.24 ha (1,120.0 acres)

Design and construction
- Architects: James Wyatt and Sir William Chambers
- Developer: DeVesci Family

Abbeyleix House, sometimes called Abbeyleix Castle, is an Irish country house that was the residence of the Viscounts de Vesci in County Laois, Ireland. It was designed by architect James Wyatt and built by Sir William Chambers in 1773. The de Vesci family lived at Abbeyleix House until it was sold in the mid-1990s. Abbeyleix is the oldest planned estate town in Ireland.

== History ==
The house was near the original Abbeyleix, that was built by the O'Mores near the River Nore where there was a Cistercian Monastery, founded in 1183. On the dissolution of the monasteries, 1,500 acres (610 ha) of land were granted to the 10th Earl of Ormond. In 1675, Denny Muschamp, a wealthy landowner, bought the old abbey lands. These were inherited in 1699 by his daughter, who married Sir Thomas Vesey, 1st Baronet, who moved to Abbeyleix when he was created a baronet. In 1770, their grandson Thomas Vesey, 2nd Baron Knapton – later, in 1776, created Viscount de Vesci – commissioned the English architect James Wyatt to build him a new house in an elevated position. The area was prone to flooding and de Vesci, wishing to improve the view from his new mansion, relocated the dwellings of his estate workers and tenants to a new site farther east on higher ground alongside the coach road, as a planned estate town, with the estate and mansion 2 kilometres (1.2 mi) to the southwest of the town.

In 1995, Abbey Leix was bought by businessman Sir David Davies, president of the Irish Georgian Society and president of Wexford Festival Opera. Davies undertook a major restoration of both the house and the demesne. By the time he acquired the property, the house had no central heating and needed to be completely rewired. Davies later said that the renovation took four years and included the replacement of all 117 windows. He also carried out extensive work on the grounds, planting specimen trees, creating a new arboretum and pinetum, and restoring the estate's walled garden. In 2019, after turning 80, Davies put the estate on the market with a view to downsizing to his family's house at Killoughter, County Wicklow.

In June 2021, Irish-American entrepreneur John Collison bought Abbey Leix from Davies. The sale of the wider estate was reported at about €20 million, while the Property Price Register later recorded €11.5 million for the house.

In 2021, Laois County Council acquired the nearby protected Millbrook House from its then owner, John Patrick Colclough, through a compulsory purchase order. The following year, the former steward's house on the de Vesci estate was bought by Jersey-based Comhlacht na Feirme Ltd, a company backed by John and Patrick Collison.

== The property ==
The large rectangular, three-storey house, with 117 windows, is considered to be one of the finest in Ireland. The property includes 1,000 acres (400 ha) of grounds, including walled gardens and farmland, and ten estate houses and cottages.
