= James Smyth (priest) =

Irish Anglican priest (1683–1759)

James Smyth (1683–1759) was an 18th-century Anglican priest in Ireland.

The son of Bishop William Smyth, and of Mary Povey, daughter of Sir John Povey, Lord Chief Justice of Ireland, he was born in Raphoe and educated at Trinity College, Dublin. Smyth was Archdeacon of Meath from 1732 until his death in 1759.

He married Catherine Vesey, one of the numerous children of John Vesey, Archbishop of Tuam, by his second wife Anne Muschamp, and had several children.
