= Cullenagh =

Barony in County Laois, Ireland

Cullenagh Cuileannach (Irish)
- Barony
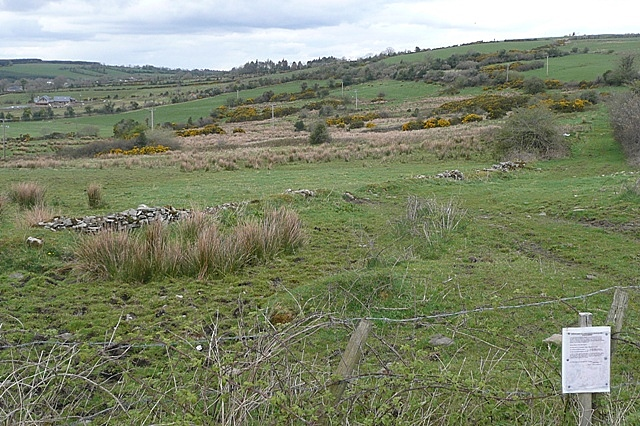
- Hills at Knockbaun

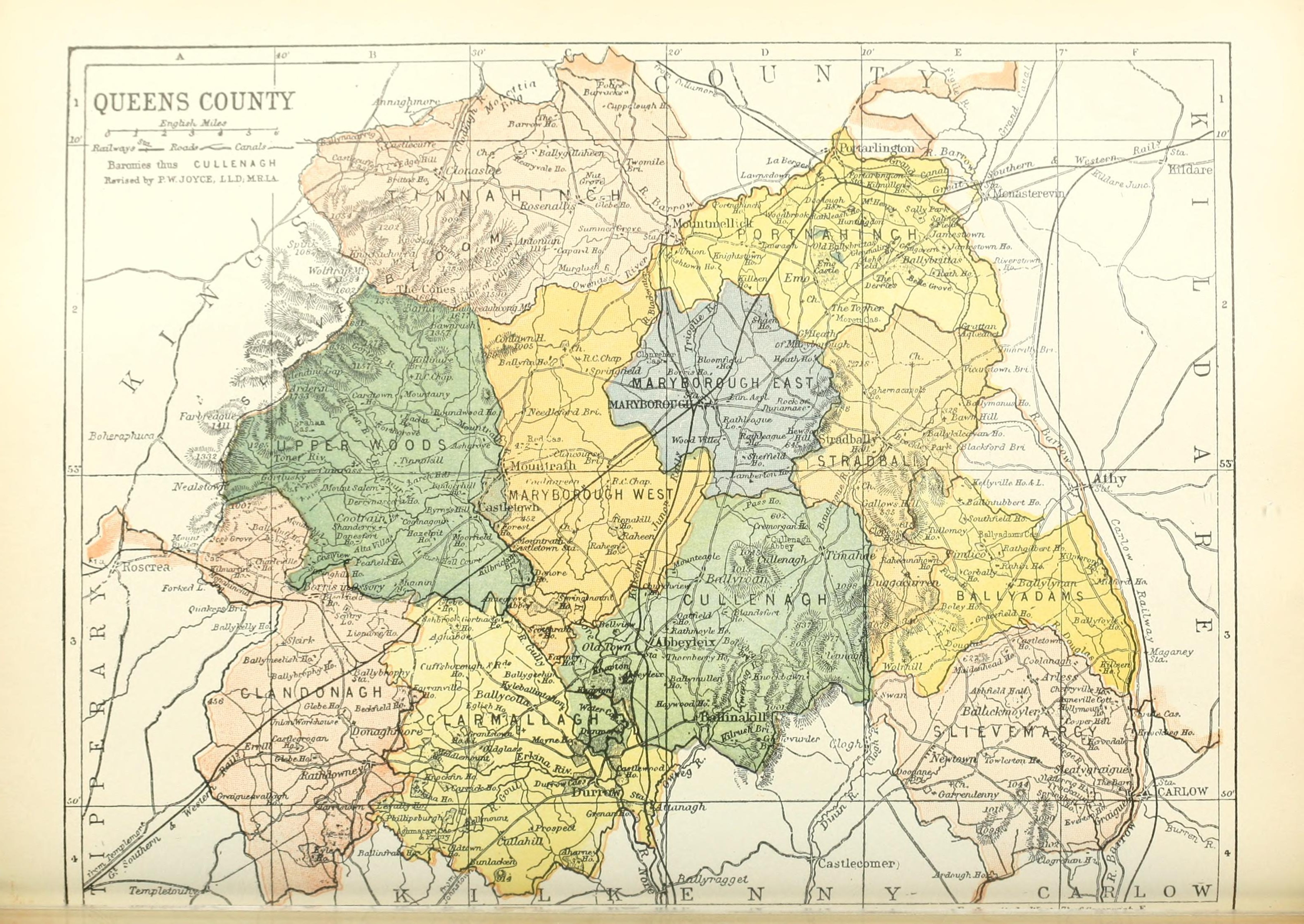
- Barony map of Queen's County, 1900; Cullenagh is green, in the south.
- Sovereign state: Ireland
- Province: Leinster
- County: Laois

Area
  - Total: 178.44 km^{2} (68.90 sq mi)

Cullenagh or Cullinagh (Irish: Cuileannach) is a barony in County Laois (formerly called Queen's County or County Leix), Ireland.

== Etymology ==
The barony is named after the Cullenagh Hills; located between Abbeyleix and Timahoe, they rise to a height of 317 metres (1,040 ft) and contain the source of the River Triogue. The name is believed to derive from Irish cuileann, "holly."

== Geography ==
Cullenagh is located in southern County Laois, mostly east of the River Nore. The southern part (near the border with County Kilkenny) is hilly, called the Slieve Lough or Dysart Hills.

== History ==
Cullenagh formed part of the ancient kingdom of Loígis. The northern part was part of Tuath-Fiodhbhuidhe (territory of the O'Devoy) along with the southern part of Maryborough West.

The southern part was called Gailine, and is mentioned in the topographical poem Tuilleadh feasa ar Éirinn óigh (Giolla na Naomh Ó hUidhrín, d. 1420):

Gailine na sreaḃ soiċleaċ
DO'Cheallaiġ ní coṁoighṫeaċ
Trom ag fiaḋacg an fine
Ar fonn ngrianach nGailine.

("Gailine of the pleasant streams to Ó Ceallaigh is not unhereditary, Mighty is the tribe at hunting on the sunny land of Gailine.")

After the Laois-Offaly Plantation, the Barrington family received land in Cullenagh. Among their descendants was the jurist and writer Jonah Barrington (1756/7–1834).

== List of settlements ==
Below is a list of settlements in Cullenagh barony:

- Abbeyleix (eastern part)
- Ballinakill
- Ballyroan
- Timahoe
