= John Vesey, 1st Baron Knapton =

Anglo-Irish politician and peer

John Denny Vesey, 1st Baron Knapton (died 1761), was an Anglo-Irish politician and peer.

== Biography ==
Vesey was the son of Sir Thomas Vesey, 1st Baronet, and his wife and cousin Mary Muschamp, only surviving daughter and heiress of Denny Muschamp of Horsley, Surrey, and his wife Elizabeth Boyle, daughter of Michael Boyle, Archbishop of Armagh.

In 1727 he was elected to the Irish House of Commons as the Member of Parliament for Newtownards, holding the seat until 1750. On 6 August 1730, he succeeded to his father's baronetcy. On 10 April 1750 he was elevated to the peerage as Baron Knapton, in the Queen's County, in the Peerage of Ireland, and he assumed his seat in the Irish House of Lords.

He married Elizabeth Brownlow, daughter of William Brownlow. He was succeeded in his titles by his eldest son, Thomas Vesey, who was made Viscount de Vesci in 1776. His daughter Elizabeth married Edmund Pery, 1st Viscount Pery, and another daughter Anne married Thomas Knox, 1st Viscount Northland.

Ancestors of John Vesey, 1st Baron Knapton

John Vesey Archbishop of Tuam
Sir Thomas Vesey, 1st Baronet
John Denny Vesey, 1st Baron Knapton
Denny Muschamp, esq., of Horsley, Surrey
Mary Muschamp
Michael Boyle, Archbishop of Armagh
Elizabeth Boyle

Parliament of Ireland
Preceded by Richard Tighe; Hon. William Ponsonby	Member of Parliament for Newtownards; 1727–1750; With: Robert Jocelyn 1727–1739; Hon. John Ponsonby 1739–1750	Succeeded by Chambré Brabazon Ponsonby; Hon. John Ponsonby
Peerage of Ireland
New creation	Baron Knapton; 1750–1761	Succeeded by Thomas Vesey
Baronetage of Ireland
Preceded by Thomas Vesey	Baronet (of Abbeyleix); 1730–1761	Succeeded by Thomas Vesey
