= Ballyroan, County Laois =

Town in County Laois, Ireland

Ballyroan Baile Átha an Róine
- Village
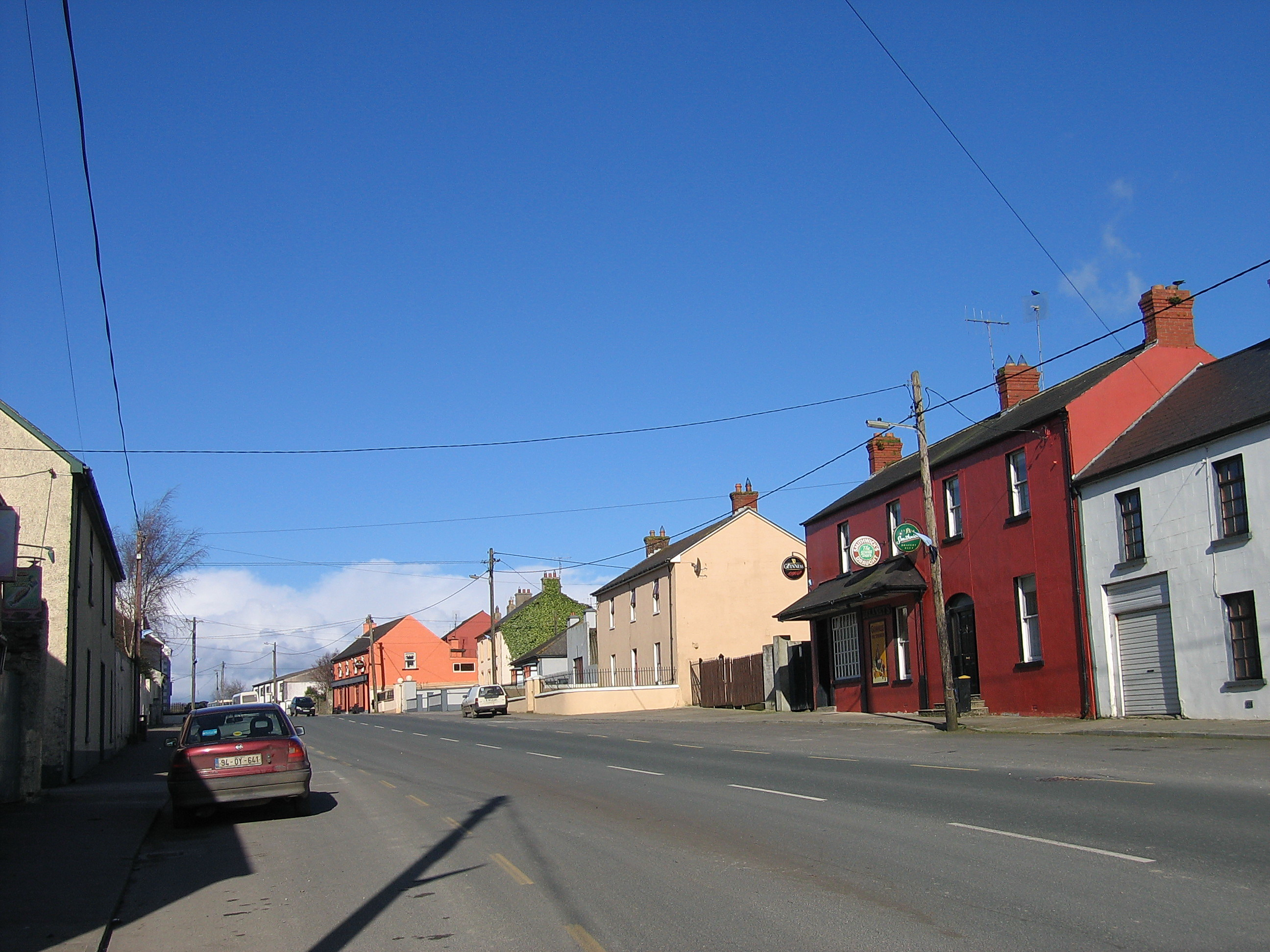
- Ballyroan's main street

- Location in Ireland
- Coordinates: 52°56′52″N 7°18′19″W
- Country: Ireland
- Province: Leinster
- County: County Laois

Population (2016)
  - Total: 563
- Time zone: UTC+0 (WET)
  - Summer (DST): UTC-1 (IST (WEST))
- Irish Grid Reference: S464889

Ballyroan (Irish: Baile Átha an Róine) is a small village in County Laois, Ireland. It is in the civil parish of Ballyroan and in the former barony of Cullenagh. The nearest town is Abbeyleix, 5 km to the south-west along the R425 road.

== History ==
Ballyroan is an ancient settlement, though its origins are obscure. A castle likely stood there in the Middle Ages, as one Conall Ó Mórdha, son of Daibhí Ó Mórdha, lord of Laois, is attested to have "built the castle of Baile atha in roine" in the fourteenth century. The area remained in the hands of the O'Mores until the sixteenth century; it is listed in the possessions of Conall Ó Mórdha (d. 1537).

In 1834, Alexander Harrison rented a house, offices, and yard on Main Street in Ballyroan. Having just passed his exam in May he was appointed surveyor of Queen's County. Brendan O Donoghue writes of Alexander Harrison's work in what is now County Laois:

"He [went] about his business in a methodical manner, dividing the roads in his county into four classes . . . The mail coach roads and the other main roads were to be [repaired] under his scheme, while the cross roads, linking the first two categories, were to [be repaired every three years]. Finally, the byroads or green roads, were to be inspected and repaired, where necessary, every seven years."

An Irish Volunteer Corps was established in Ballyroan in mid-1914. They would become the only corps in Laois to support Eoin MacNeill over John Redmond during the debate as to whether the Irish Volunteers should participate in the First World War. On April 3, 1920, the abandoned RIC police barracks in Ballyroan were attacked and burned.

In 1831, Ballyroan had a population of 714. In 1841, on the eve of the Great Famine, it had a population of 637. The size of the village has since declined considerably. In 1996, the population was 173; in 2002, it was 142.

=== Education ===
The village has a long educational history. In 1686, Alderman John Preston founded a private school in the village known as Ballyroan School, endowed with lands in Cappaloughlan. The school was in a large slated building erected at a cost of £500, which has since been demolished. Protestant boys received a free education, while Catholic boys paid £1 per quarter. In the nineteenth century, the school moved to Abbeyleix. The Brigidine Sisters came to the village in 1877 and opened a school operating under a Catholic ethos. Three sisters (nuns) from the Abbeyleix Community took up residence in their newly built convent on 25 September of that year. Their convent and school closed in 1974.

Ballyroan was home to separate boys' and girls' primary schools until 2017, when they were amalgamated into a single national school in a new building. The school is named for Pope John Paul II.

== Sport ==
The local Gaelic football club is Ballyroan Abbey GAA. A former club was Ballyroan GAA. Ballyroan was the first village in Leinster to play football in 1889.

== See also ==
- List of towns and villages in Ireland
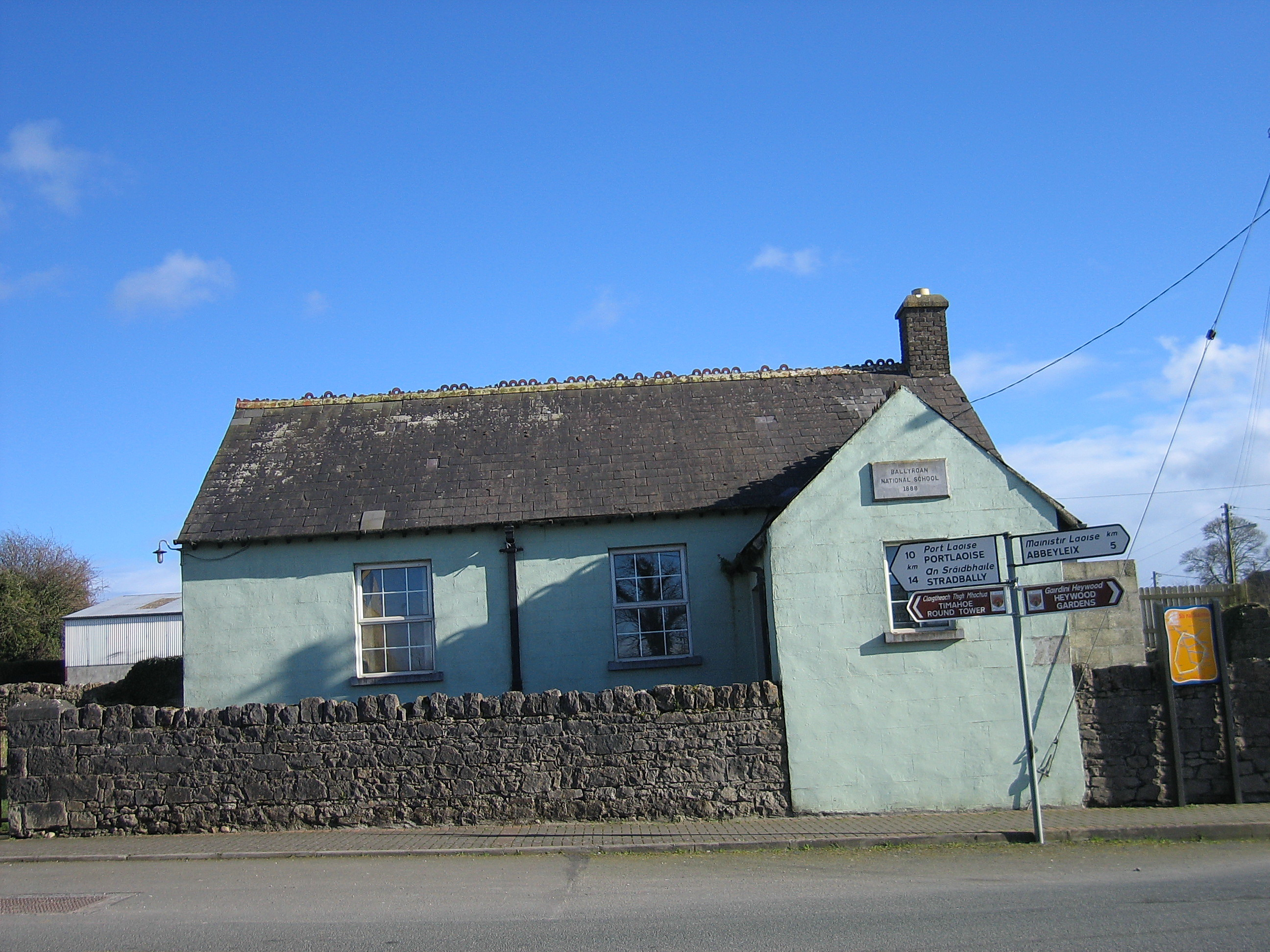
Old national school (1888)

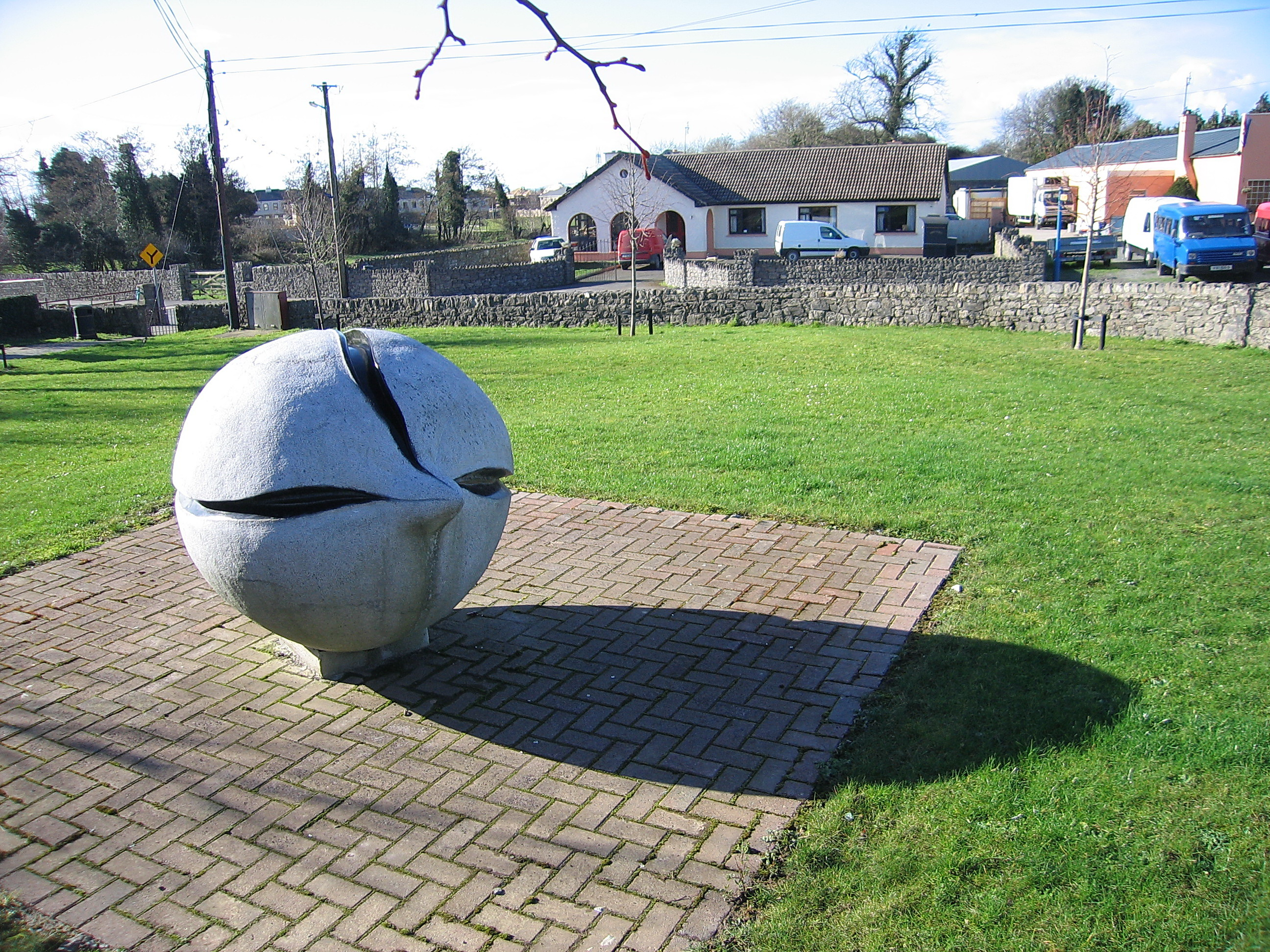
Autumn, a sculpture

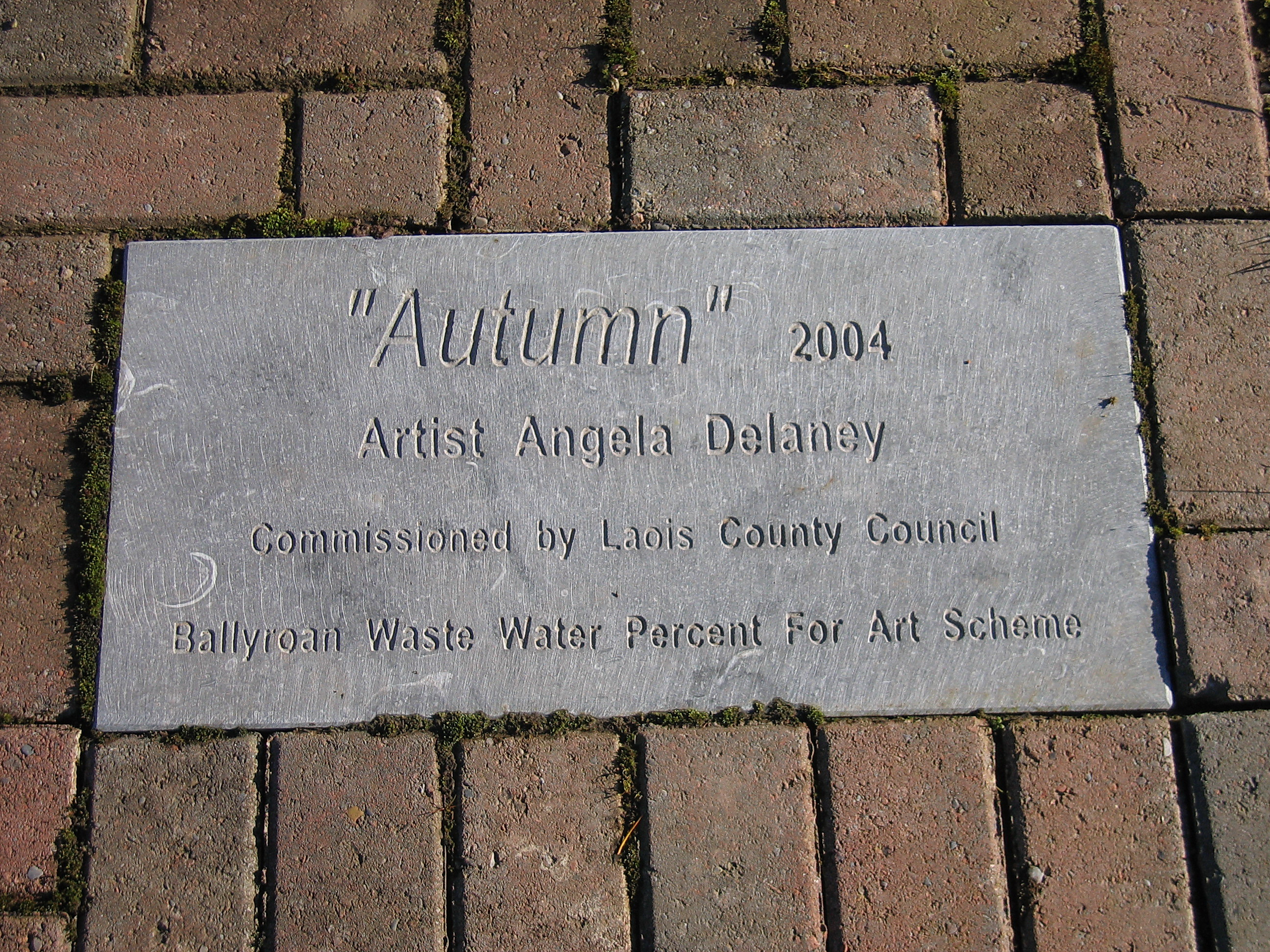
Sculpture plaque

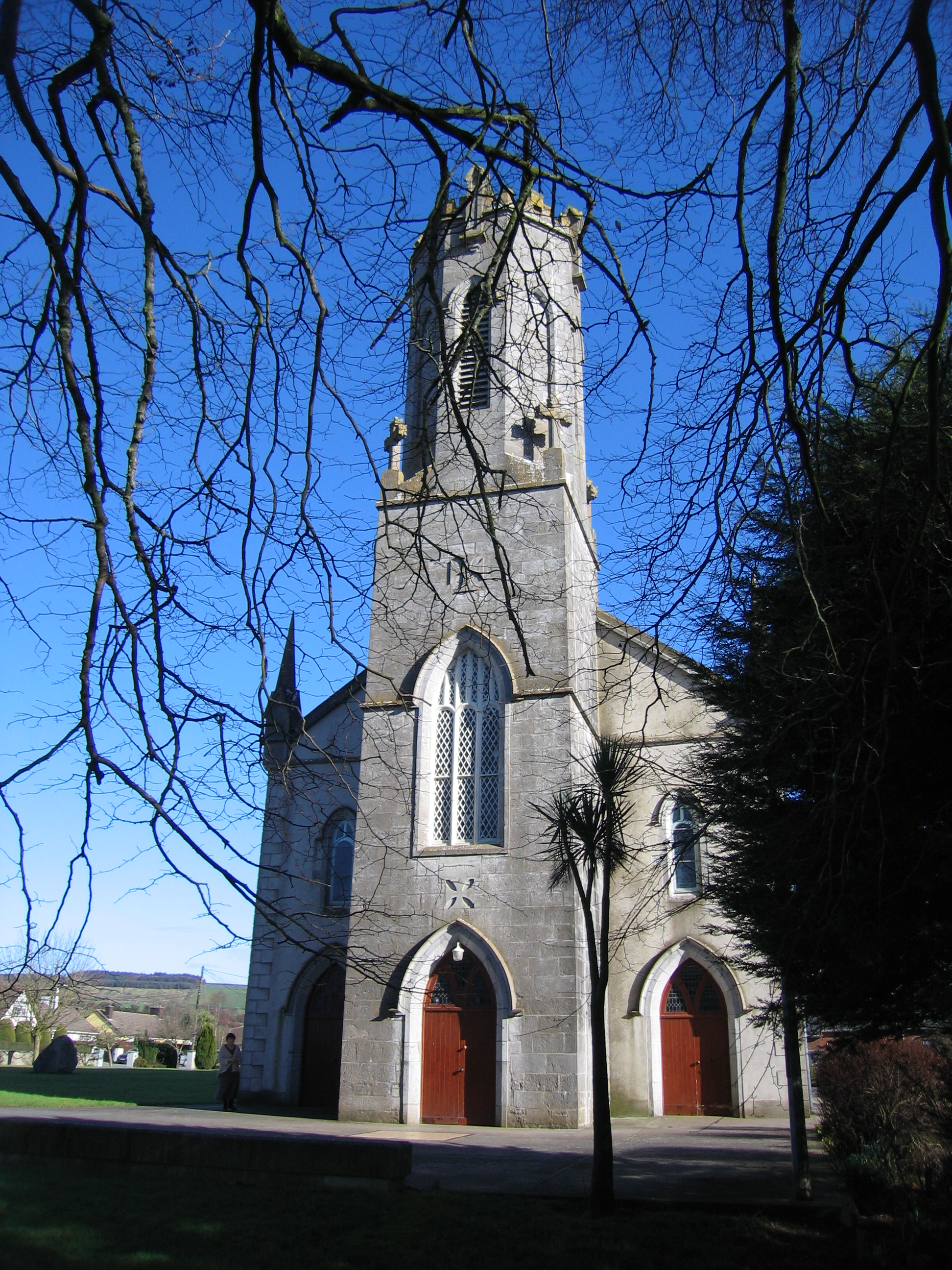
A church in Ballyroan
