= John Vesey (archbishop of Tuam) =

Irish archbishop

John Vesey (10 March 1638 – 28 March 1716) was a Church of Ireland clergyman.

== Biography ==
He was born in Coleraine, son of Thomas Vesey, the local rector. His grandfather William Vesey had emigrated from Cumbria in the previous century. The family were Presbyterians who later conformed to the Established Church. He was educated at Westminster School and Trinity College, Dublin. He is said to have holy orders at an unusually young age. He was Archdeacon of Armagh, then Dean of Cork. He was made Bishop of Limerick, Ardfert and Aghadoe in 1672. In 1678 he became Archbishop of Tuam.

During the religious troubles in the reign of King James II of England, he and his diocese suffered greatly: his cattle were driven off and attempts were made to burn his cathedral. Finally, fearing that their lives were in danger, he and his wife and twelve children fled to London in late 1688, where he obtained a poorly paid lectureship. He was proscribed by the Patriot Parliament in 1689. After James's downfall, he returned to Ireland and preached a sermon of thanksgiving before the Parliament of Ireland. In 1712 and 1714 he served as one of the Lords Justices of Ireland. He died at Hollymount, County Mayo, in the large and comfortable house that he had built after the Episcopal palace at Tuam was burnt during his exile in England.

== Family ==
He married firstly Rebecca Wilson, who died about 1665, and secondly Anne Muschamp, daughter of Agmondisham Muschamp, and had at least fourteen children: they included:

- Sir Thomas Vesey, 1st Baronet, ancestor of the Viscounts de Vesci
- Agmondisham Vesey (1677–1739), ancestor of the Earls of Lucan
- John Vesey, Archdeacon of Kilfenora, ancestor of the Barons Fitzgerald and Vesey
- William Vesey, 1687–1750
- Francis Vesey
- Mary, married to Sir Robert Staples, 4th Baronet
- Elizabeth, married to Richard Dawson, ancestor of the Earls of Dartrey
- Catherine, who married James Smyth, Archdeacon of Meath
- Anne, married to Henry Bingham, ancestor of the Barons Clanmorris.

Church of Ireland titles
| Preceded by Thomas Vesey | Archdeacon of Armagh; 1662–1663 | Succeeded by Thomas Vesey (again) |
| Preceded by Roger Boyle | Dean of Cork; 1667–1672 | Succeeded by Arthur Pomeroy |
| Preceded by Francis Marsh | Bishop of Limerick, Ardfert and Aghadoe; 1672–1679 | Succeeded by Simon Digby |
| Preceded by John Parker | Archbishop of Tuam; 1679–1716 | Succeeded by Edward Synge |
Government offices
| Preceded by Sir Constantine Phipps; Richard Ingoldsby | Lord Justice of Ireland; 1712–1713; With: Sir Constantine Phipps | Succeeded by The Duke of Shrewsbury as Lord Lieutenant |
| Preceded by The Duke of Shrewsbury as Lord Lieutenant | Lord Justice of Ireland; 1714; With: the Archbishop of Armagh and Sir Constantine Phipps, temp. Queen Anne the Archbishop of Dublin and the Earl of Kildare, temp. George I | Succeeded by The Earl of Sunderland as Lord Lieutenant |
