= R425 road (Ireland) =

Road in Ireland

R425 road
- Bóthar R425
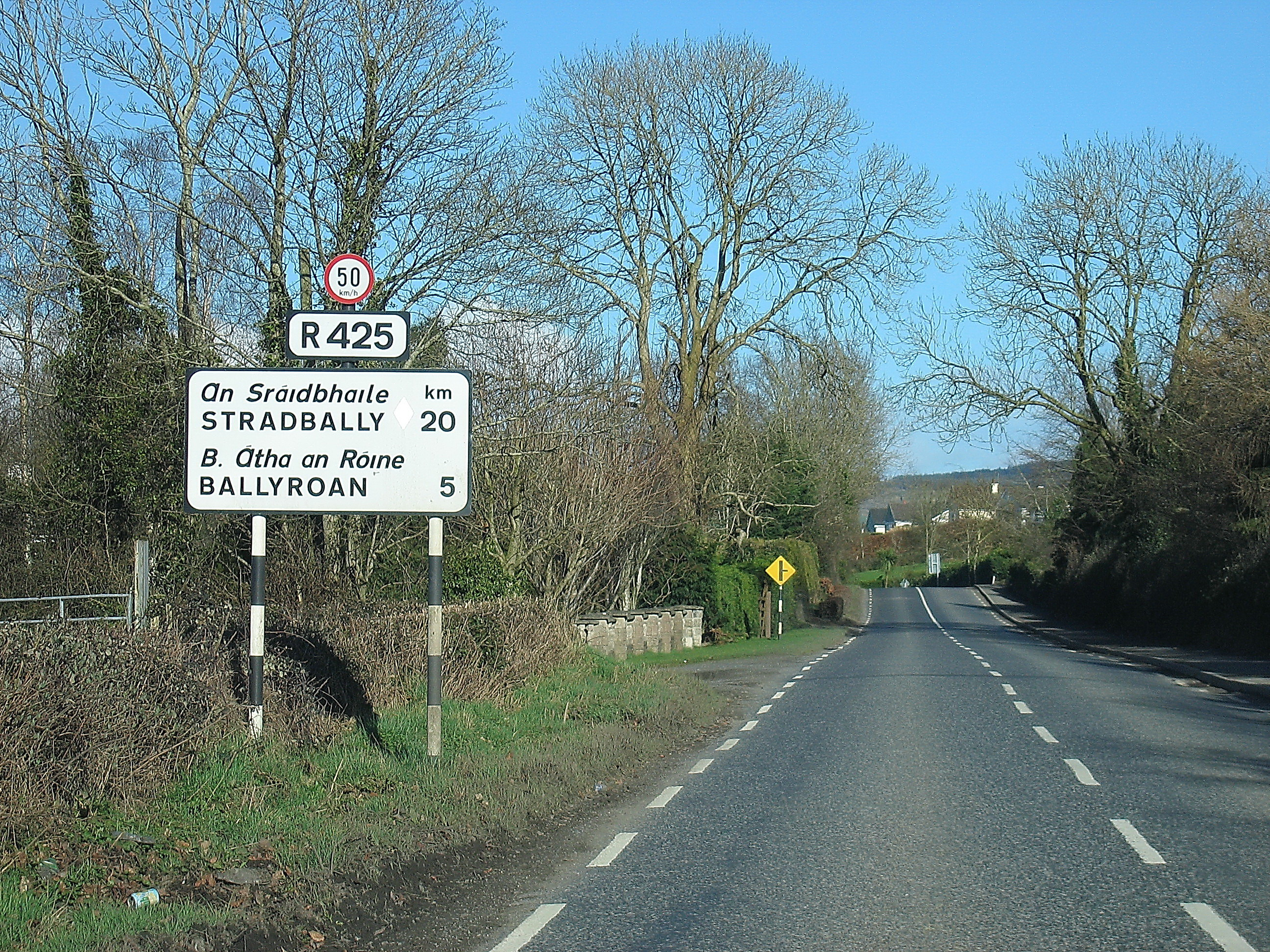
- R425 heading north from Abbeyleix

Route information
- Length: 17 km (11 mi)

Location
- Country: Ireland
- Primary destinations: County Laois; Abbeyleix leave the N77; Ballyroan; R427; Cashel; R426; N80; R445

Highway system
- Roads in Ireland; Motorways; Primary; Secondary; Regional

The R425 road is a regional road in County Laois in Ireland. From south to north to runs from Abbeyleix to Ballyroan to the hamlet of Cashel and then joins the R445 east of Portlaoise. It is a road of 17 km (11 mi) running almost parallel to the N77.

== See also ==
- Roads in Ireland
- National primary road
- National secondary road
