= Venie Barr =

Irish political activist and philanthropist (1875–1947)

Sarah "Venie" Barr
- Born: Sarah Moyles; 3 October 1875; Abbeyleix, County Laois
- Died: 1 November 1947 (aged 72); Ravenna, Malone Road, Belfast

Sarah "Venie" Barr (3 October 1875 – 1 November 1947) was an Irish political and community activist.

== Life ==
Sarah "Venie" Barr was born Sarah Moyles in Abbeyleix, County Laois, on 3 October 1875. She was the daughter of trader James Moyles and his wife Eliza Jane Moyles (née Pratt). She was an original member of the Ulster Women's Unionist Council (UWUC), serving as member of the standing committee, and appointed the first chief of the Post House Staff of the Ulster Volunteer Force in 1914. At a meeting of South Belfast Women's Association upon the outbreak of World War I, she proposed that a fund be created to send gifts to soldiers. This saw the foundation of the Ulster Women's Gift Fund for War Hospital Supplies which sent medicine, food and books to navy and army units as well as hospitals and prisons of war. In November 1918, the fund had raised £119,481. She served as the honorary treasurer of the Gift Fund from 1918, continuing the work of the fund into World War II. For her work, Barr was awarded a CBE in 1920.

Barr was a speaking delegate for the UWUC to the UUC (now Ulster Unionist Party), going on to sit as assistant honorary treasurer from 1920 to 1930, honorary treasurer from 1930 to 1947 and vice chair from 1923 to 1925 and 1935 to 1947. Barr also served as the chair of St Anne's Women's Unionist Association from 1918 to 1947. She was the honorary treasurer of the Girl Guides Association. She was also the honorary of the Belfast Council of Social Welfare, and under this capacity she visited Canada in 1930. Barr was the president of Toc H Women Helper, Belfast Branch.

She married Ainsworth Barr, a stockbroker and international rugby half-back, in 1901. The couple had at least two sons. They lived at Ravenna, Malone Road, Belfast, where Sarah Barr died on 1 November 1947. The UWUC inaugurated the Barr memorial cup in 1948, a cup awarded to the branch enjoying the highest percentage of female voters on its registers.
