= William Smyth (Irish bishop) =

Anglican bishop

William Smyth was a seventeenth century Anglican bishop in Ireland. He was the ancestor of the prominent landowning family of Barbavilla Manor, Collinstown, County Westmeath.

Smyth (1644–1699) was born in County Antrim, son of Captain Ralph Smyth(b. 1615 Rosedale Abbey, Yorkshire, d.1689 Lisburn), who had settled in Ireland c.1630 and acquired lands in Antrim and County Down. He was educated at Trinity College, Dublin. He was appointed Treasurer of Armagh in 1667; and a prebendary of Derry in 1670. He was Dean of Dromore from 1673 to 1681. He became Bishop of Killala and Achonry in 1681 but translated to Raphoe a year later. He spent 12 years at Raphoe before being translated again to Kilmore. He was summoned to attend the short-lived Patriot Parliament called by James II of England in 1689. He died on 24 February 1699 and was buried at St Peter, Dublin.

He married Mary Povey at Saint Michan, Dublin on 29 May 1672, daughter of Sir John Povey, Lord Chief Justice of Ireland, and Elizabeth Folliott. They had three sons and four daughters.

He acquired large estates in County Westmeath. Some of these were inherited by his eldest son Ralph, a barrister of Gray's Inn, who spent much of his life in England, but Ranaghan and Collinstown passed to his third son William. Another son, James, was Archdeacon of Meath. The family home, Barbavilla Manor, belonged to the Smyth family for two centuries.

His episcopal papers are a valuable source of information on the Church of Ireland after 1660, and in particular on his conflict with the Presbyterian Church in County Cavan.
