= John Vesey, 2nd Viscount de Vesci =

Anglo-Irish politician and peer

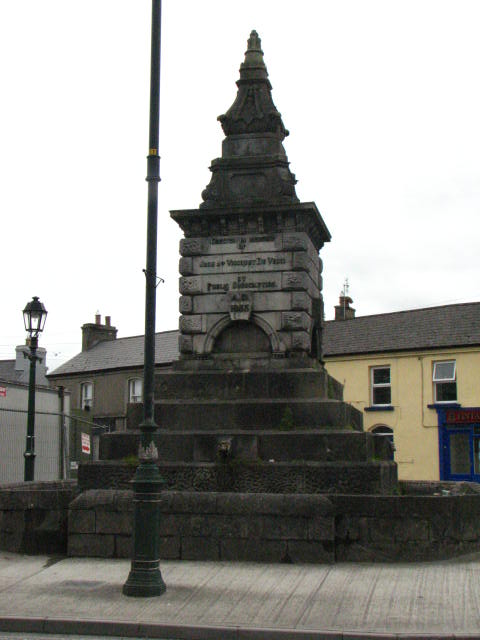
Monument to John, 2nd Viscount de Vesci, in Abbeyleix

The Rt Hon. John Vesey, 2nd Viscount de Vesci and 3rd Baron Knapton (16 February 1771 – 19 October 1855), was an Anglo-Irish politician and peer.

Around 1790, Vesey planned and developed the new town of Abbeyleix because the original settlement was subject to flooding of the River Nore. The old settlement was levelled and the residents moved to the new town. He was a compassionate and conscientious landlord and was extremely charitable to the local people during the difficult famine years. A fountain in memory of John Vesey stands in the Market Square of Abbeyleix. A map commissioned by John Vesey in 1828, showing the Abbeyleix Manor holdings was discovered after almost 200 years and went to auction in 2016.

== Family ==
Vesey was the son of the 1st Viscount de Vesci and Selina Elizabeth Brooke. He was elected to the Irish House of Commons as the Member of Parliament for Maryborough in 1796, sitting until 1798. On 13 October 1804, he succeeded to his father's titles. In 1839, Lord de Vesci was elected by his fellow peers to sit in the British House of Lords as an Irish representative peer. From 1831 to his death in 1855, he served as the first Lord Lieutenant of Queen's County.

== Marriage and issue ==
On 25 August 1800, he married Frances Letitia Brownlow, the fifth daughter of his great-uncle, William Brownlow. He was succeeded by his eldest son, Thomas Vesey.

- Thomas (3rd Viscount Vesey)
- William John (1806–1863)
- Catherine, who married her cousin, Lt. Col. Patrick John Nugent

Parliament of Ireland
Preceded by Samuel Hayes; Charles Coote	Member of Parliament for Maryborough; 1796–1798; With: Charles Coote	Succeeded by Eyre Coote; Henry Parnell
Political offices
Preceded by The Lord Farnham	Representative peer for Ireland; 1839–1855	Succeeded by The Viscount Lifford
Honorary titles
New office	Lord Lieutenant of Queen's County; 1831–1855	Succeeded by The Lord Castletown
Peerage of Ireland
Preceded by Thomas Vesey	Viscount de Vesci; 1804–1855	Succeeded by Thomas Vesey
Preceded by Thomas Vesey	Baron Knapton; 1804–1855	Succeeded by Thomas Vesey
Baronetage of Ireland
Preceded by Thomas Vesey	Baronet (of Abbeyleix); 1804–1855	Succeeded by Thomas Vesey
