= Vicarstown =

Village in County Laois, Ireland

Vicarstown Baile an Bhiocáire
- Village
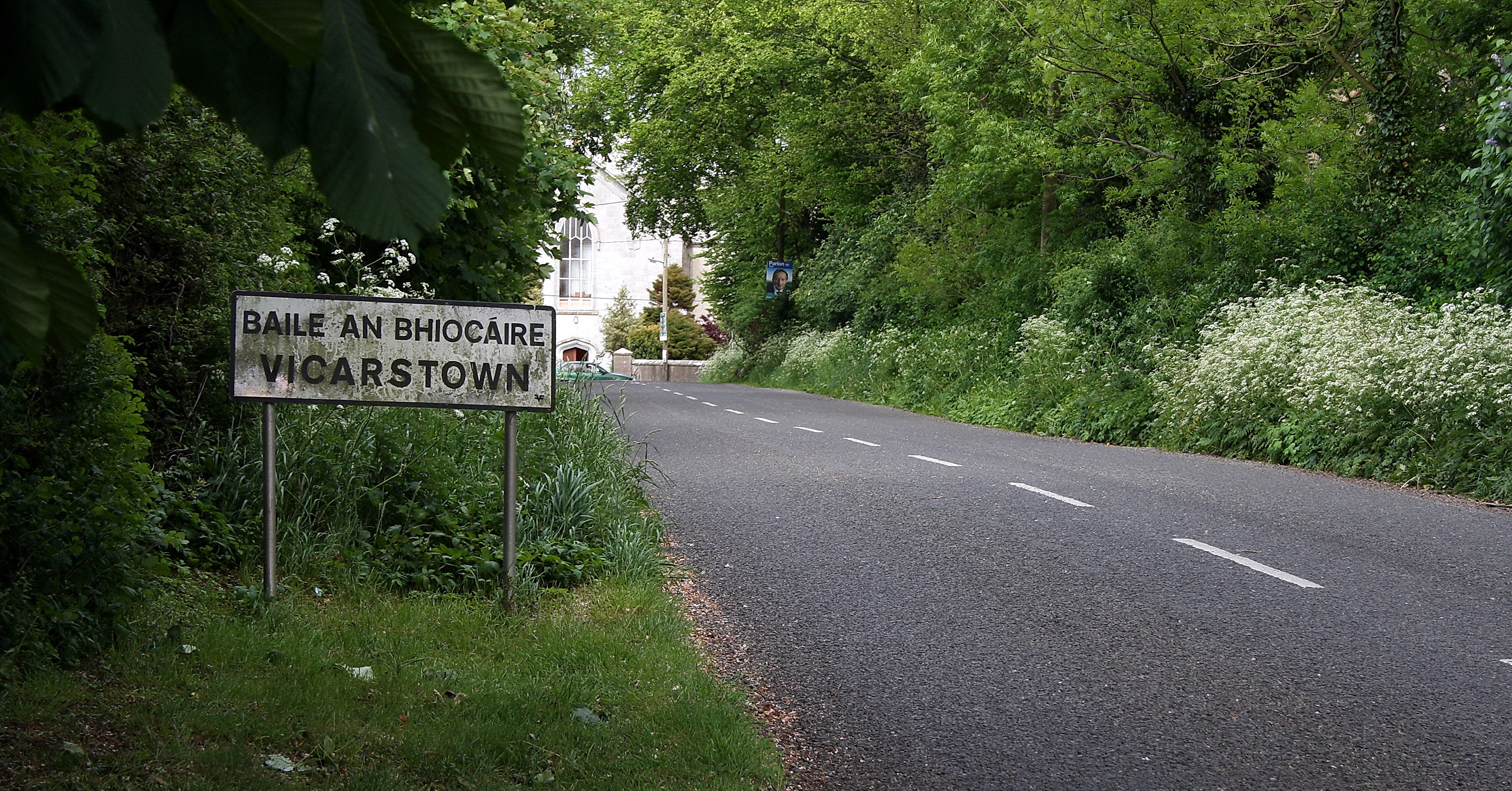
- Entering Vicarstown on the R427

- Location in Ireland
- Coordinates: 53.0517°N 7.0837°W
- Country: Ireland
- Province: Leinster
- County: County Laois

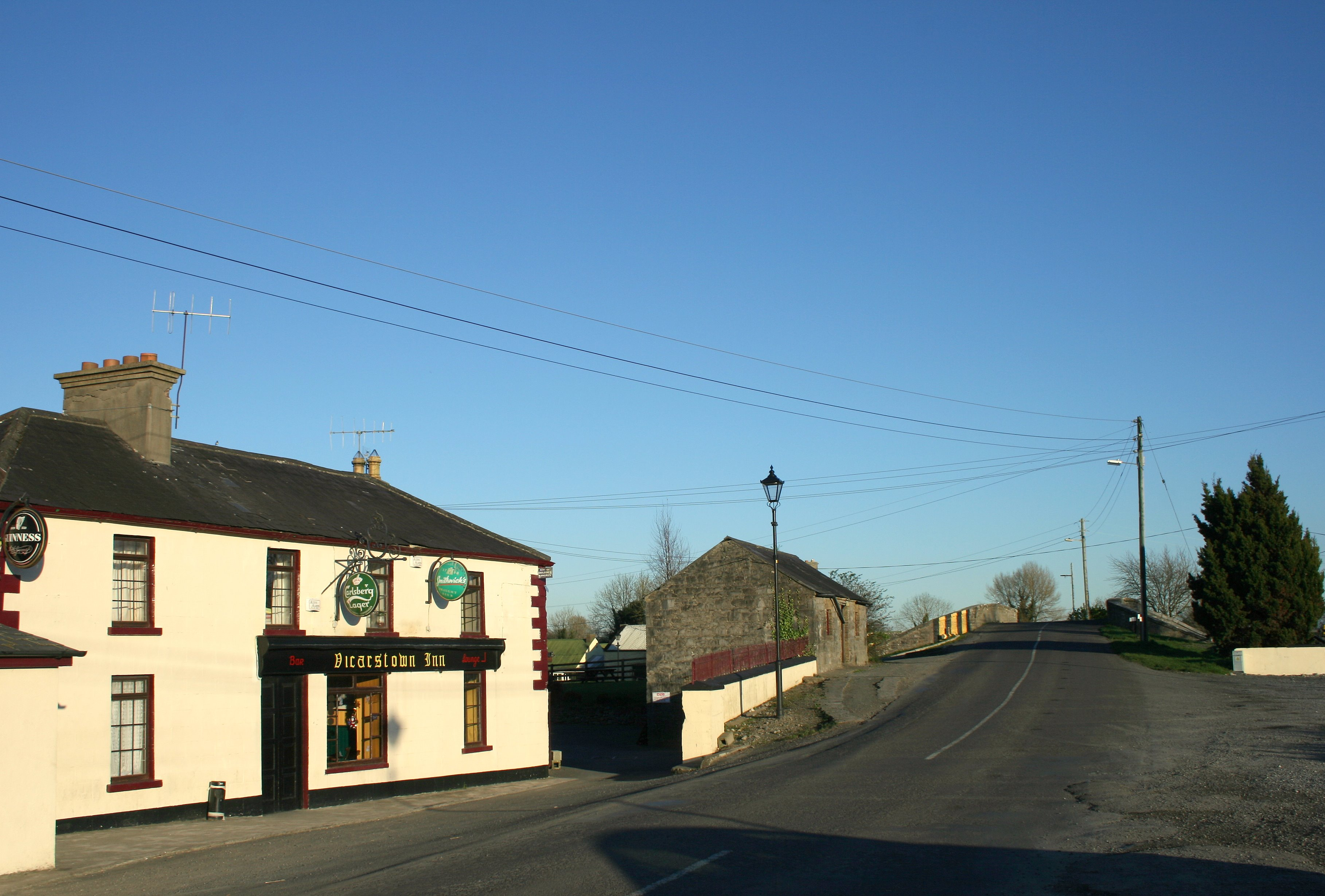
R427 approaching the bridge over the Grand Canal and to the left is the Vicarstown Inn bar.

Vicarstown, historically known as Ballynevicar, Ballyvicar and Ballyvicary (Irish: Baile an Bhiocáire, meaning 'town of the vicar'), is a village in County Laois, Ireland. It stands at the point where the R427 regional road crosses the Grand Canal.

== Sport ==
Annanough (Áth na nEac in Irish) is the local Gaelic football team.

Vicarstown is the location of the only parkrun in County Laois.

== Facilities ==
The village has a Catholic church, a community hall and a Gaelic Athletic Association field. The village also has a bar and a place to rent canal barges.

== Notable people ==
- Henry Grattan, the orator and politician, having been awarded £50,000 by the Irish Parliament in 1782 to purchase lands, bought property in this area from the Cosby family of Stradbally.
- Patrick Noel Turley, rugby player who was capped for Ireland against England in 1962. Was later not allowed to play GAA for local team.

== See also ==
- List of towns and villages in Ireland
