= Robert Booth (judge) =

English-born judge

Sir Robert Booth (1626–1681) was an English-born judge who had a highly successful career in Ireland, where he held the offices of Chief Justice of the Irish Common Pleas and Lord Chief Justice of the King's Bench in Ireland.

== Early life ==
He belonged to the Booth family of Salford: he was the eldest son of Robert Booth, a wealthy landowner, and Anne Mosley, daughter of Oswald Mosley of Ancoats, Manchester, (who was also the ancestor of the prominent twentieth-century politician Sir Oswald Mosley), and his wife Anne Lowe. His father died when Robert was about twelve and his mother remarried the noted Presbyterian preacher and Parliamentarian Thomas Case. Booth himself, though he was a member of the Church of England, had strong nonconformist leanings. He was educated at Manchester Grammar School and St. John's College, Cambridge, where he matriculated in 1644. He entered Gray's Inn in 1642 and was called to the bar in 1650; he became an ancient of Gray's Inn in 1662.

== Career ==
He is first heard of in Ireland in the entourage of William Steele, the Lord Chancellor of Ireland, in 1657, and entered the King's Inns the same year. After the Restoration he had the good fortune to attract the notice of Steele's successor, Sir Maurice Eustace. Eustace, a staunch Royalist, was normally hostile to anyone who had been associated with the Cromwellian regime (although he had made his peace with it himself), but he admired Booth's legal ability and believed (perhaps naively) that his wealth would preserve him from corruption. That Booth's stepfather Thomas Case, though a staunch Presbyterian, has strongly supported the Restoration may also have been a recommendation. Booth was appointed a puisne justice of the Court of Common Pleas (Ireland) in 1660 and its Chief Justice in 1670, by which time he had already begun to suffer from the chronic ill-health which plagued his later years. His salary was fixed at £300 a year. He was a Bencher of the King's Inns and lived conveniently close to the Inns on present-day Church Street. He was one of the original Governors of the Erasmus Smith schools. He regularly visited England to consult with his medical advisers, and was knighted while on a trip to England in 1668. He was passed over as Lord Chief Justice when the office fell vacant in 1673, on account of his strong Protestant sympathies.

=== Lord Chief Justice ===
In 1679 the Chief Justiceship of the Court of King's Bench (Ireland) became vacant. This occurred at the height of the Popish Plot, which created an uncontrollable atmosphere of anti-Catholic hysteria. At this time several Irish judges had open Roman Catholic sympathies, despite the practice of that faith being (in theory) a bar to public office. Booth, who had been brought up by his Puritan stepfather, who closely supervised his education, had a reputation as an extreme Protestant, while also staunchly loyal to the Stuart dynasty, and it was probably for that reason that Charles II appointed him Lord Chief Justice, despite objections from James Butler, 1st Duke of Ormonde, the Lord Lieutenant of Ireland, who thought that Booth was far too inclined to Puritanism. Charles in more tranquil and tolerant times had previously held the same view, firmly rejecting Booth for the same office in 1673, due to his "spirit of Presbyterianism or indifference". Ormonde also pointed out that Booth was almost incapacitated by gout and other illnesses, and rarely sat in Court. Ormonde's objections on the second point were fully justified, since Booth died in the early spring of 1681, after little more than a year in office. He was buried at Salford. He left a large fortune and substantial estates in both England and Ireland.

== Personal life ==
Booth married firstly Mary Potts, daughter of Spencer Potts of Chalgrave, Bedfordshire, who died in 1660 giving birth to their only son Benjamin, who died in 1663. He next married Susanna Oxenden, daughter of Sir Henry Oxenden, 1st Baronet of Deane in Kent and his second wife Elizabeth Meredith of Leeds Abbey. Susanna died in 1669: they had four daughters. Of their daughters Ann married her distant cousin the Right Reverend Robert Booth, Dean of Bristol, and was the mother of the celebrated actor Barton Booth. Her sister Susannah married Sir John Feilding, a grandson of the Earl of Desmond, and secretary to the Governor of Jamaica, and had issue. Another daughter Elizabeth married John Braithwaite.

His principal residence was at Oxmantown, on present-day Church Street, adjacent to the King's Inns: it was rated for the hearth tax on ten hearths, making it one of the largest dwelling houses in the city. In 1664 he petitioned for a right of way through the Inns garden: "that he might come a nearer way, privately into the house".

Belvidere, his house at Drumcondra, Dublin, is now St. Patrick's College, Drumcondra.

The Gore-Booth baronets of Lissadell are related to but not direct descendants of the judge.

Sir Henry Oxenden, father of Sir Robert Booth's second wife Susannah

Legal offices
Preceded by Sir Edward Smith (or Smythe)	Chief Justice of the Irish Common Pleas; 1670–1679	Succeeded by John Keating
Preceded by Sir John Povey	Lord Chief Justice of Ireland; 1679–1680	Succeeded by Sir William Davys
