= John Vesey (archdeacon) =

18th-century Anglican priest in Ireland

John Vesey was an 18th-century Anglican priest in Ireland.

The son of John Vesey, Archbishop of Tuam, and his second wife Anne Muschamp, he was educated at Trinity College, Dublin and Christ Church, Oxford. Vesey was Rector of Ballinrobe. In 1706 he was appointed Prebendary of Kilmoylan at Tuam Cathedral. Vesey was Archdeacon of Kilfenora from 1714 to 1743.
