= R417 road (Ireland) =

Road in Ireland

R417 road
- Bóthar R417
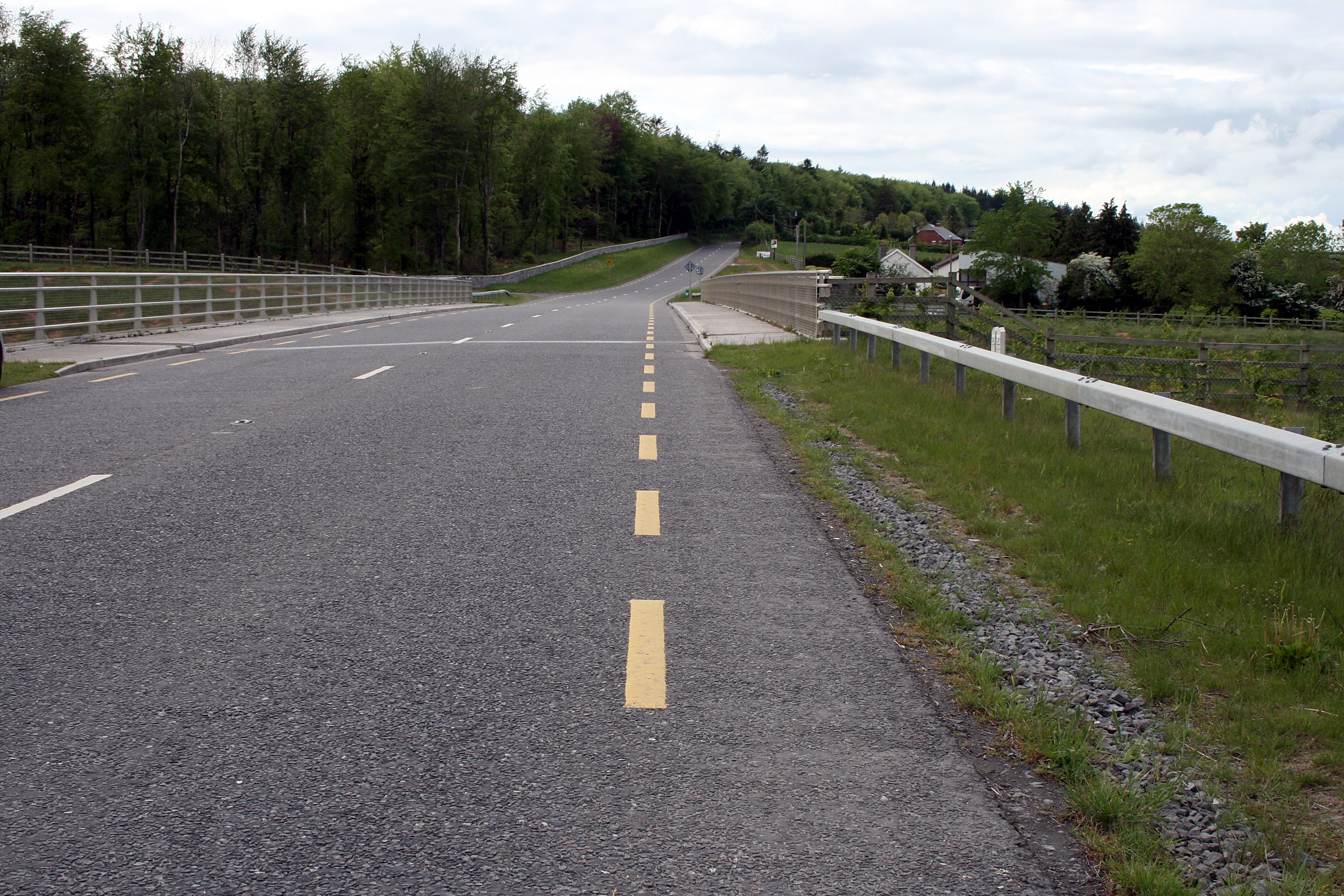
- R417 crossing the M7 near Monasterevin

Route information
- Length: 37 km (23 mi)

Location
- Country: Ireland
- Primary destinations: County Kildare; Monasterevin leave the R445; Pass over the M7 motorway; Kildangan (at Cross Keys); (R427); Kilberry; Athy – (N78); Cross the River Lerr; Maganey – (R429); County Carlow; Carlow – (N80); Carlow terminates at Burrin Street, junction with R448

Highway system
- Roads in Ireland; Motorways; Primary; Secondary; Regional

The R417 road is a regional road in Ireland, which runs north-south from the R445 in Monasterevin, County Kildare to the R448 in Carlow, County Carlow.

En route it crosses the N78 National secondary road in the town of Athy, and also the N80 at the north of Carlow town. The route is 37 km (23 mi) long.

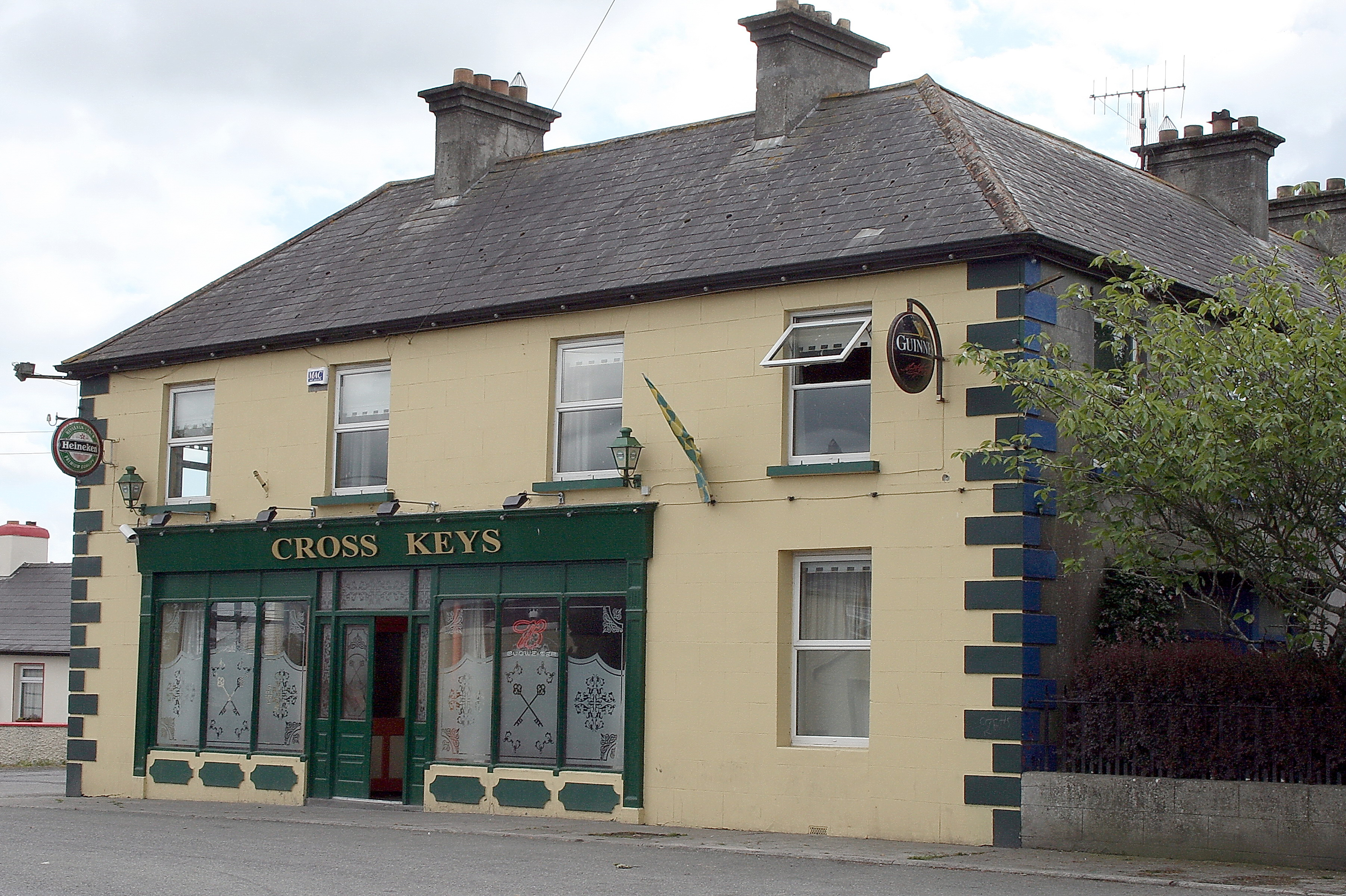
Cross Keys on the R417, Kildangan

== See also ==
- Roads in Ireland
- National primary road
- National secondary road
