= Ainsworth Barr =

Rugby union player from Northern Ireland

- Born: 9 December 1875 Belfast, Ireland
- Died: 19 December 1934 (aged 59) Belfast, Northern Ireland
- School: Methodist College Belfast; Tonbridge School
- Notable relative: Venie Barr (wife)
- Occupation: Stockbroker

Rugby union career
- Position: Halfback
International career
Years	Team	Apps	(Points)
1898–01	Ireland	4	(0)

Ainsworth Barr (9 December 1875 — 19 December 1934) was an Irish international rugby union player.

== Biography ==
Born in Belfast, Barr was the son of James Barr, a director of the whiskey distillery Dunvilles. He attended the local Methodist College, as well as Tonbridge School in Kent, England.

Barr was capped four times as a halfback for Ireland in intermittent appearances between 1898 and 1901, which included their 1899 win over Scotland, en route to the triple crown.

After five years as a practising solicitor, Barr became a stockbroker in 1903 and was senior director at W. F. Coates & Company, the firm of Sir William Coates. He served a term as IRFU president in 1908–09.

Barr married political activist Venie Barr (née Moyles).

== See also ==
- List of Ireland national rugby union players
