= Oxmantown =

Historical suburb of Dublin, Ireland

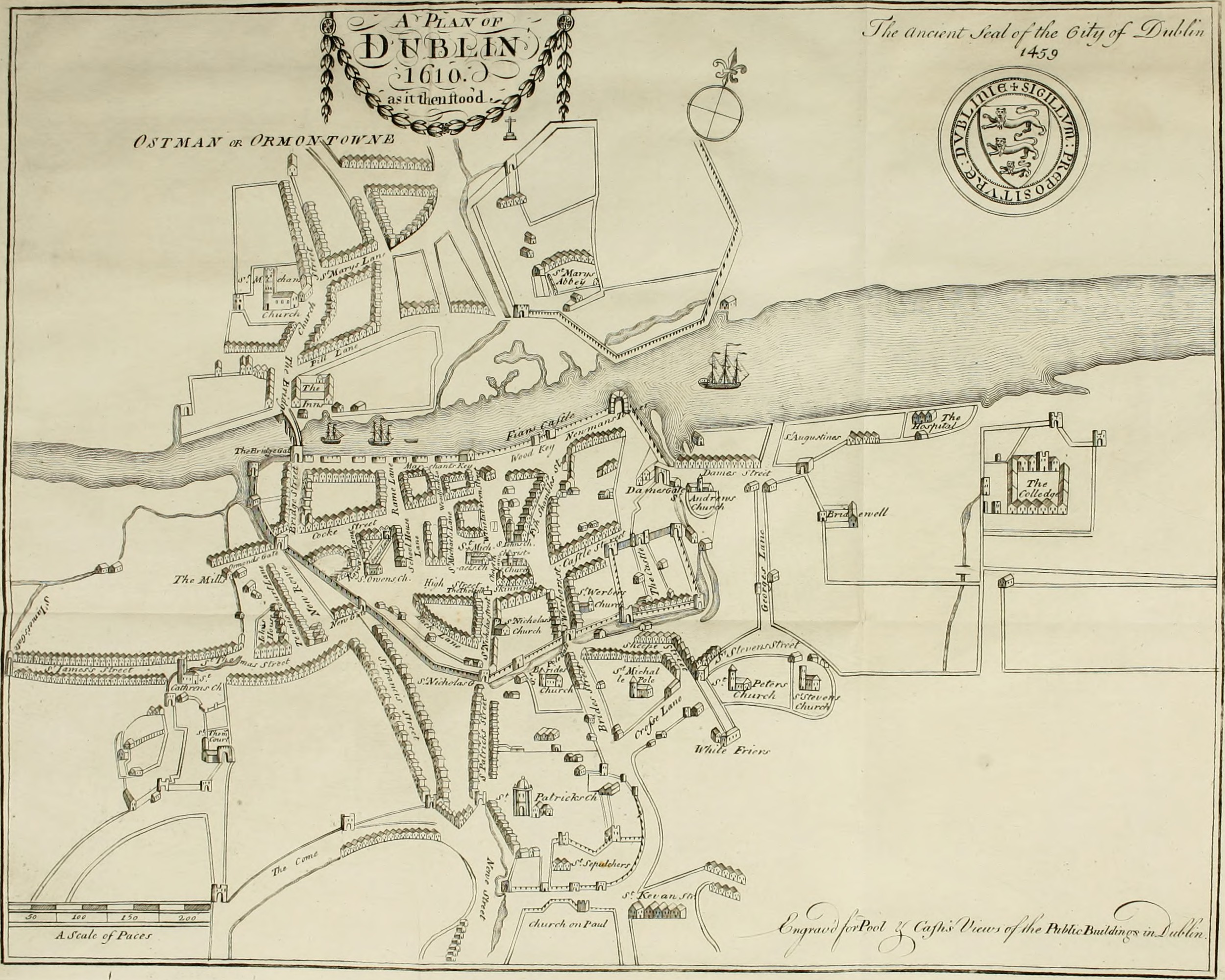
Copy of John Speed's 1610 map of Dublin, showing "Ostmantowne"

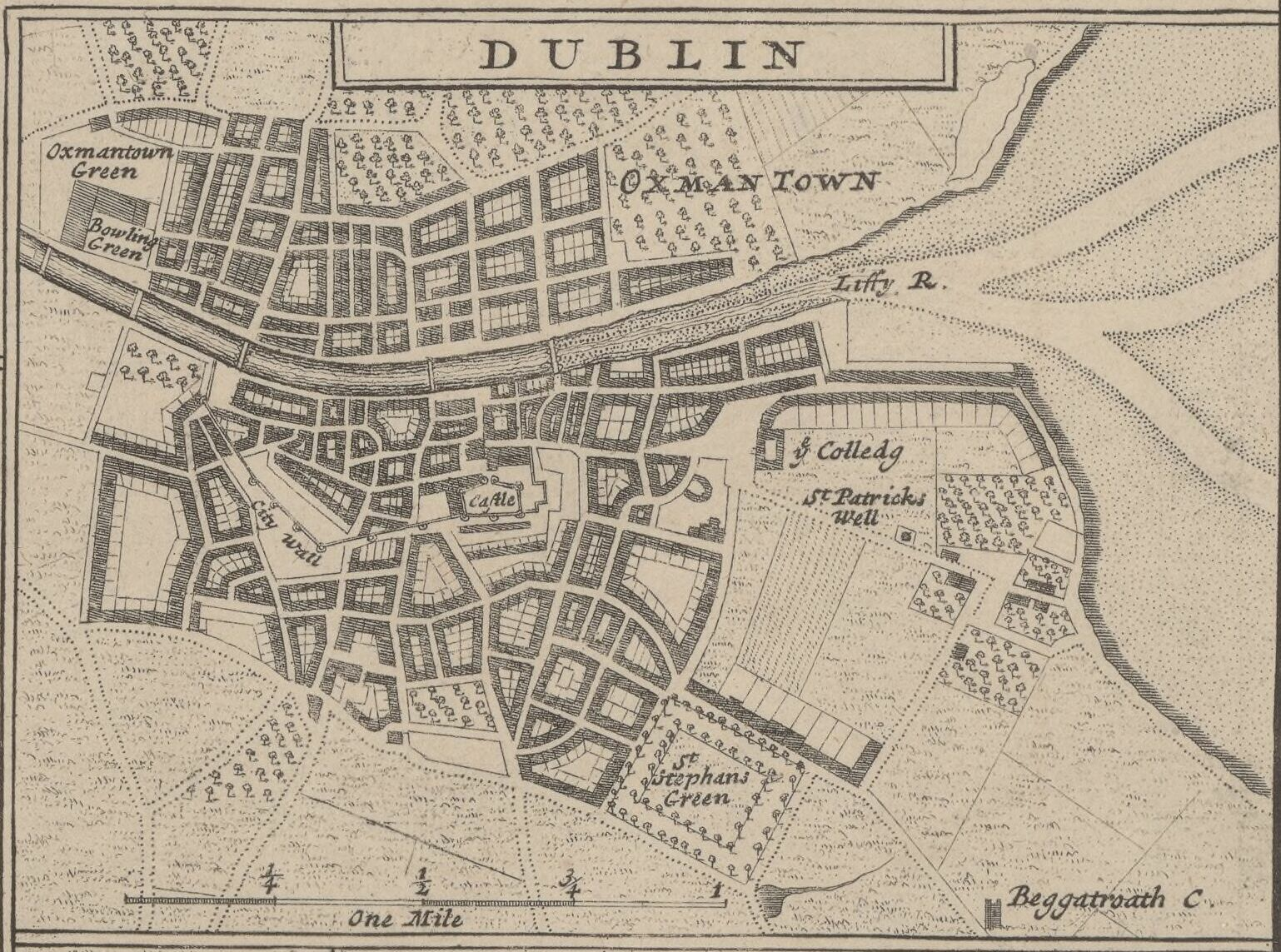
Herman Moll's 1714 map of Dublin

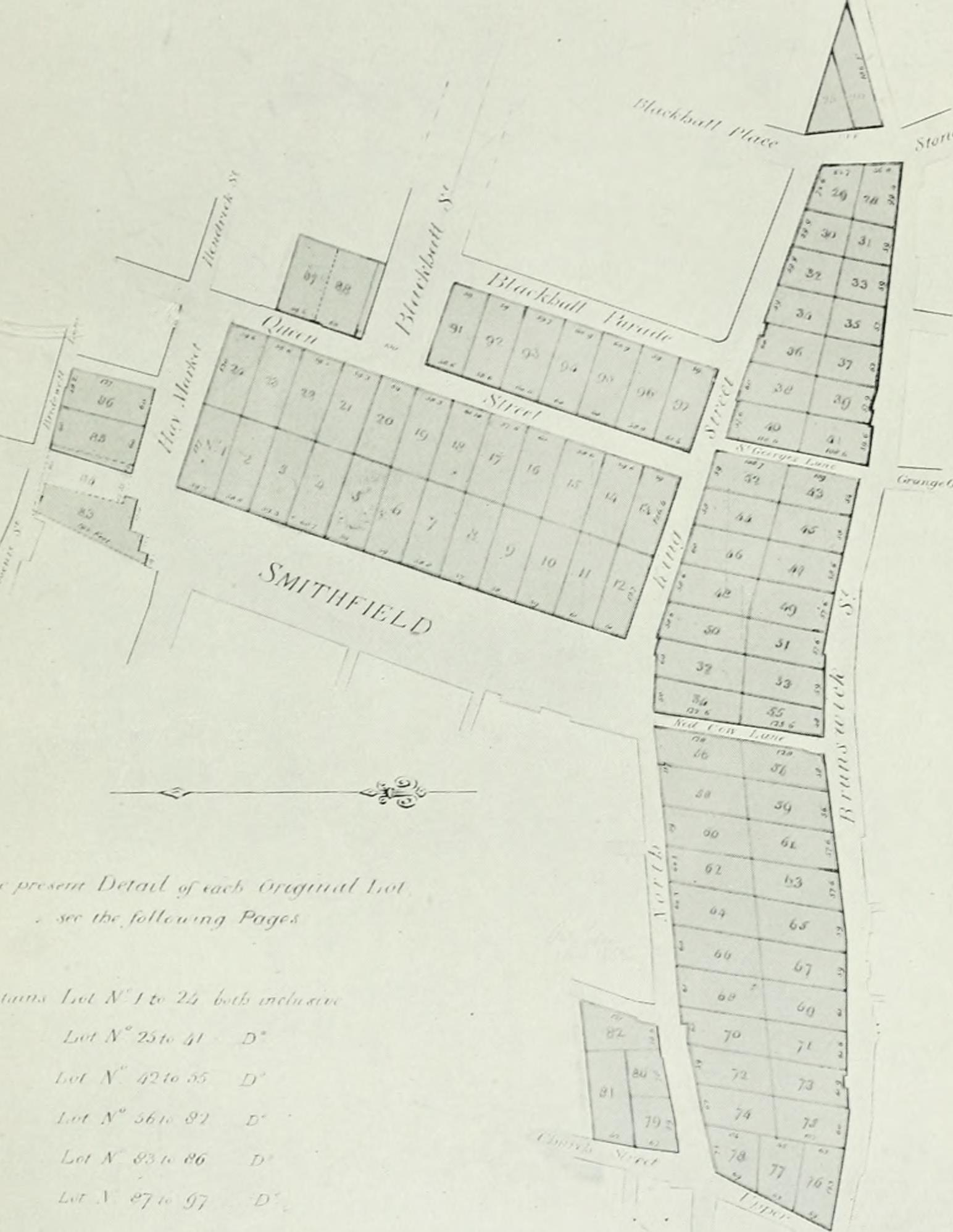
Plan showing the streets and lots laid out on Oxmantown Green in 1655

Oxmantown was a suburb on the opposite bank of the Liffey from Dublin, in what is now the city's Northside. It was founded in the 12th century by Hiberno-Norse Dubliners or "Ostmen" who either migrated voluntarily or were expelled from inside of the city walls of Dublin after the Anglo-Norman invasion and the 1171 beheading of Hasculf, the last Hiberno-Norse King of Dublin by the invading army. The settlement was originally known as Ostmanby or Ostmantown.

The settlement was bounded on the east by the lands of St Mary's Abbey and on the west by Oxmantown Green, an extensive common. Oxmantown lay within the parish of St Michan's, which was the only church on the Northside until the parishes of St Mary's and St Paul's were formed in 1697 to cater to the district's burgeoning population.

The residential centre of Oxmantown was present-day Church Street. In the 17th century, there were several impressive houses here, one of them owned by Sir Robert Booth, the Lord Chief Justice of Ireland. His house abutted the garden of the King's Inns, and in 1664, he petitioned for the creation of a right of way through the garden so that he might more conveniently enter the Inns by a private way.

John Atherton, Bishop of Waterford and Lismore, was executed by hanging on Oxmantown Green on 5 December 1640, after being found guilty of buggery.

The name is still occasionally used for the broader area around Smithfield. It is perpetuated in street names such as Oxmantown Road and Oxmantown Lane, and in the names of various local businesses.

== See also ==
- List of towns and villages in Ireland
- Baron Oxmantown
