= R427 road (Ireland) =

Road in Ireland

R427 road
- Bóthar R427
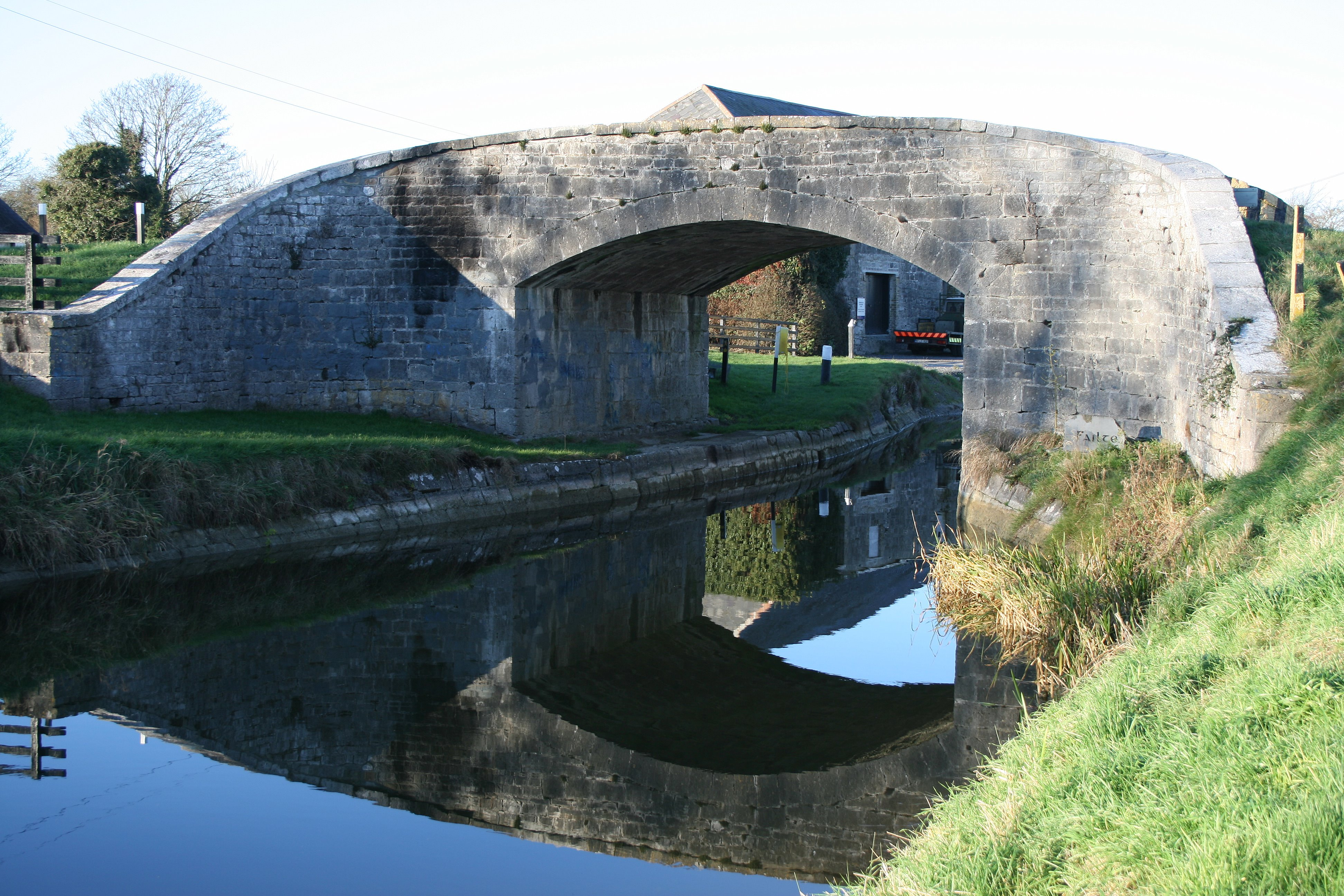
- R427 crossing the Grand Canal at Vicarstown

Route information
- Length: 21 km (13 mi)

Location
- Country: Ireland
- Primary destinations: County Laois; Leave the R425; Stradbally – (N80); Vicarstown – Crosses the Grand Canal; Crosses the River Barrow; County Kildare; Terminates at the R417

Highway system
- Roads in Ireland; Motorways; Primary; Secondary; Regional

The R427 road is a regional road in Ireland, which runs southwest-northeast from the R425 in County Laois to the R417 in County Kildare.

En route it passes through Vicarstown and Stradbally and crosses the Grand Canal and the River Barrow. The route is 21 km (13 mi) long.

== See also ==
- Roads in Ireland
- National primary road
- National secondary road
