= Thomas Vesey, 1st Viscount de Vesci =

Anglo-Irish peer

The Right Honourable The Viscount de Vesci
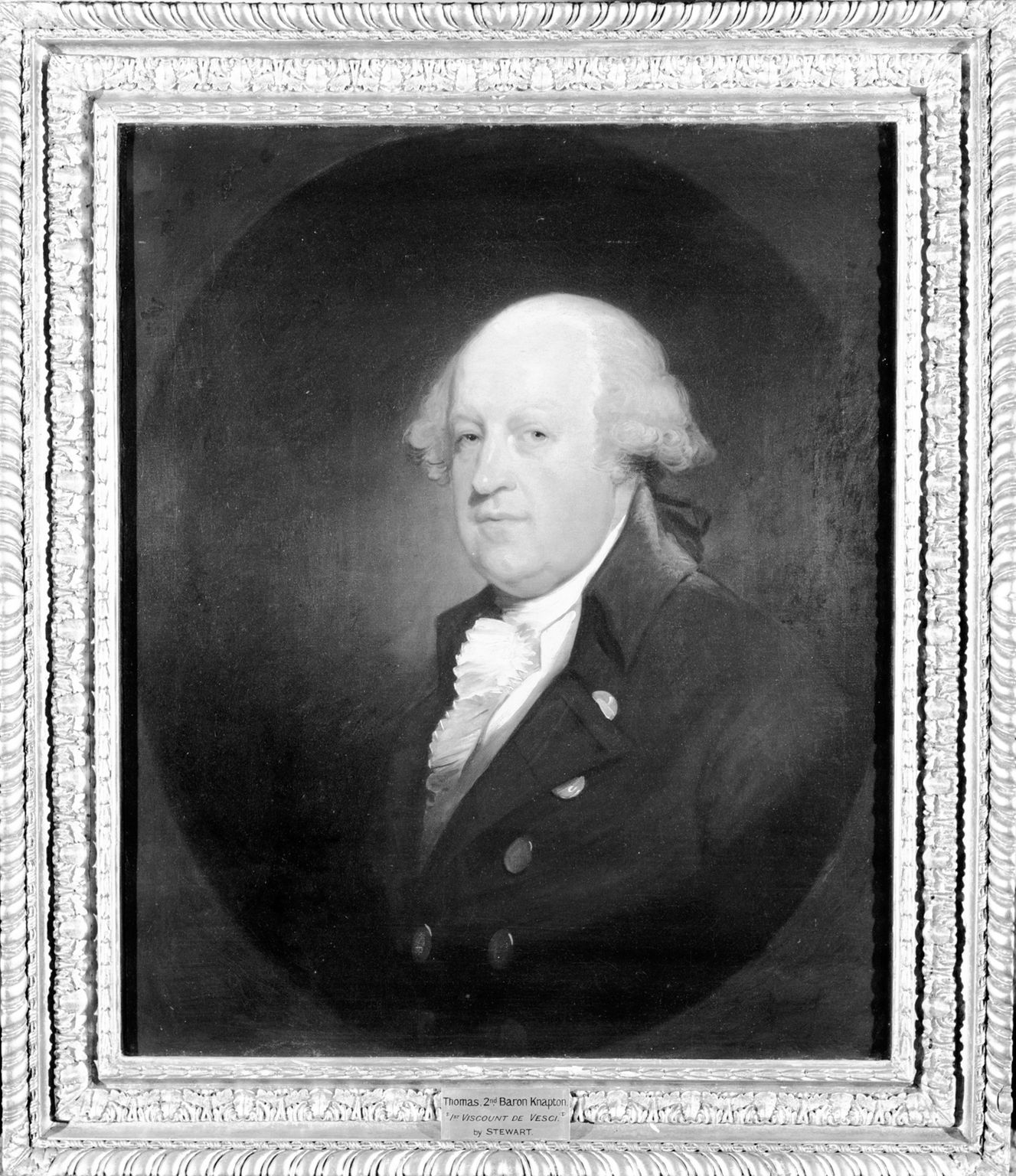
- Portrait by Gilbert Stuart

Personal details
- Born: c. 1735
- Died: 13 October 1804
- Spouse: Elizabeth-Selina Brooke (m. 1769)
- Children: 5
- Parents: John Vesey, 1st Baron Knapton; Elizabeth Brownlow

The Rt Hon. Thomas Vesey, 1st Viscount de Vesci and 2nd Baron Knapton (c. 1735 – 13 October 1804), was an Anglo-Irish peer.

Lord de Vesci was the son of the 1st Baron Knapton and Elizabeth Brownlow. He succeeded to his father's peerage on 25 June 1761 and assumed his seat in the Irish House of Lords. On 22 June 1776 he was made Viscount de Vesci, of Abbeyleix in the Queen's County, in the Peerage of Ireland.

On 24 September 1769, Lord Knapton, as he then was, married Elizabeth-Selina Brooke, the eldest daughter and co-heiress of Sir Arthur Brooke, 1st Baronet. Lord de Vesci was succeeded in his titles by his eldest son, John Vesey.

Peerage of Ireland
New creation	Viscount de Vesci; 1776–1804	Succeeded by John Vesey
Preceded by John Vesey	Baron Knapton; 1761–1804	Succeeded by John Vesey
Baronetage of Ireland
Preceded by John Vesey	Baronet (of Abbeyleix); 1761–1804	Succeeded by John Vesey
