= John Povey =

English-born Irish judge

Sir John Povey (1621–1679) was an English-born judge who had a highly successful career in Ireland, holding office as Baron of the Court of Exchequer (Ireland) and subsequently as Lord Chief Justice of Ireland during the years 1673–9.

== Background ==
He was born at Woodseaves, near Market Drayton, Shropshire, eldest son of John Povey. Thomas Povey, the friend of Samuel Pepys and John Evelyn, who features often in Pepys' Diary, was his cousin. Through another Povey cousin Anne Blathwayt, daughter of Justinian Povey, auditor-general to Queen Anne of Denmark, the Poveys developed a useful family connection to the politically prominent Blathwayt family. John was educated at Trinity College, Oxford, and matriculated in 1636. He entered Gray's Inn in 1638 and was called to the Bar in 1645.

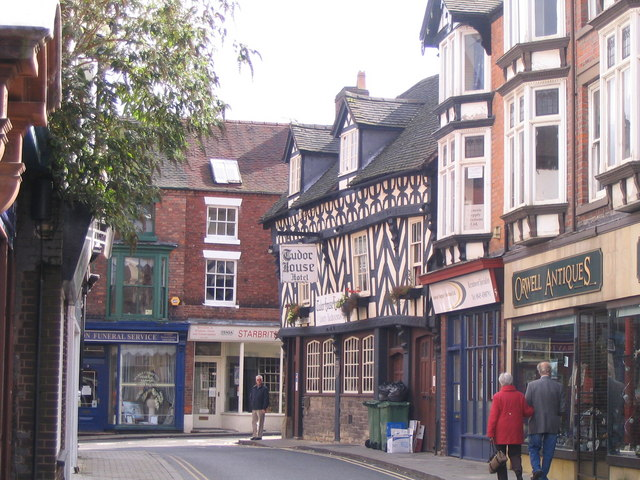
Market Drayton, Shropshire, Povey's birthplace, modern day

== Career ==
He is first heard of in Ireland in 1658, when he was acting as legal advisor to Sir John Barrington, 3rd Baronet, a politician and landowner who, although he was a relative of Oliver Cromwell, had refused to sit as one of the judges at the trial of Charles I. Povey went on the Munster circuit, did well at the Irish Bar, and brought his family to live in Ireland. He lived at Nicholas St. in Dublin, and later bought Powerstown House, Mulhuddart, outside Dublin city.

After the Restoration of Charles II, Povey continued to prosper: James Butler, 1st Duke of Ormonde, the Lord Lieutenant of Ireland thought well of him, while his cousin Thomas was now Treasurer to the future Catholic King James II. He sat in the Irish House of Commons as member for Swords 1661-6 and was a Commissioner of Revenue Appeals. He was appointed third Baron of the Exchequer in 1663. He entered the King's Inns and became a Bencher. One of his more notable judgments was to allow the indictment of several persons for aiding and abetting murder during the Irish Rebellion of 1641.

In 1673 the office of Lord Chief Justice fell vacant. The most highly qualified candidates, although both had serious health problems, were Povey and Sir Robert Booth. Arthur Capell, 1st Earl of Essex, the Lord Lieutenant of Ireland, supported Booth, but Charles II, who favoured a considerable degree of toleration of Roman Catholics, rejected him as being too strong a Protestant. Povey, with his connection to the future James II's household, was an acceptable compromise. He was knighted, and given the Freedom of the City of Dublin. He earned praise for his good services as Chief Justice, and it was suggested that he might be transferred to the English Bench in 1675; but soon after his wife's death in 1677, his health began to fail. He went to France in hope of a cure, but died at Bordeaux early in 1679. His body was brought back to Ireland, and he was buried in St. Michan's Church, Dublin

== Family ==
In 1648 he married Elizabeth Folliott (died 1677), eldest daughter of Guthlake (or Guthlac) Folliott of Martin Hussingtree, Worcester, clerk to the chapter of Worcester Cathedral, and his wife Elizabeth. Povey's wife was the sister of Isabella Folliott Tomkins, to whom her father-in-law, the Welsh composer Thomas Tomkins, dedicated his work Gaillard- the Lady Folliott's.

They had four children:

- John Povey (c.1649–1715) MP for Mitchell, who married his cousin Mary Vivian, half-sister of William Blathwayt, Secretary at War;
- Charles, who has been tentatively identified as the writer and entrepreneur Charles Povey (c.1651–1743);
- Richard;
- Mary, who married Dr. William Smyth (1638-1699), Bishop of Raphoe, and later Bishop of Kilmore. Their descendants were the well-known landowning Smyth family of Barbavilla Manor, County Westmeath.

Legal offices
| Preceded by Baron Barry of Santry | Lord Chief Justice of Ireland; 1673–1679 | Succeeded by Sir Robert Booth |
