= Viscount de Vesci =

Title in the peerage of Ireland

Arms of Viscount de Vesci of Abbeyleix, being a differenced version of his ancestral arms of Vesey: Or, on a cross sable a patriarchal cross of the field

Viscount de Vesci, of Abbeyleix in the Queen's County, now called County Laois (pronounced "leash"), is a title in the Peerage of Ireland. It was created in 1776 for Thomas Vesey, 2nd Baron Knapton and 3rd Baronet.

== History ==
The baronetcy, of Abbeyleix in the Queen's County, was created in the Baronetage of Ireland on 28 September 1698 for Reverend Thomas Vesey, Bishop of Killaloe (1713–1714) and Bishop of Ossory (1714–1730).

The title Baron Knapton was created in the Peerage of Ireland in 1750 for John Vesey, 2nd Baronet, son of the 1st Baronet, who had earlier represented Newtownards in the Irish House of Commons.

The 2nd Baron Knapton was made Viscount de Vesci in 1776.

The family title of Vesci is pronounced "Vessee" and the family surname of Vesey is pronounced "Veezey".

=== Estates and residences ===
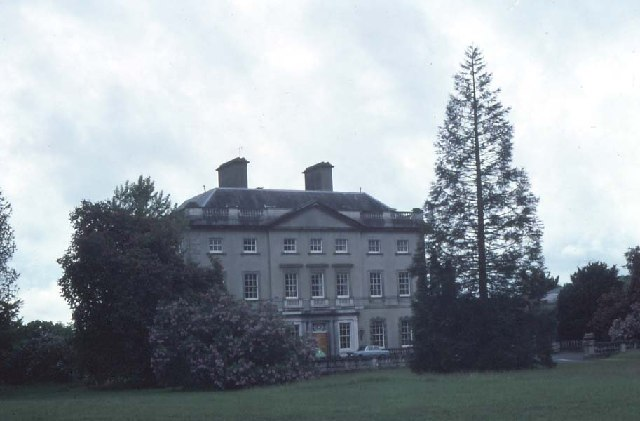

The family seat was Abbeyleix House, near Abbeyleix, County Laois from c. 1770 until 1995.

The Abbeyleix estate came into the family's ownership via the marriage of Sir Thomas Vesey, 1st Baronet to the heiress Mary Muschamp in 1698. Their grandson, Thomas Vesey, 2nd Baron Knapton (created Viscount de Vesci in 1776) commissioned the English architect James Wyatt to construct the current Abbeyleix House in 1770.

The 1883 edition of John Bateman's The Great Landowners of Great Britain and Ireland records that the estates of John Vesey, 4th Viscount de Vesci consisted of 16,682 acres in England and Ireland, including 420 acres in County Dublin, 15,069 acres in County Laois (then known as "Queen's County"), 818 acres in County Cork, and 375 acres in Kent; Bateman records the combined annual income from these estates as £45,214, with the majority (£31,713) arising from the 400 acres Lord de Vesci owned in County Dublin.

Abbeyleix House continued the family's principal seat until the house was sold by Thomas Vesey, 7th Viscount de Vesci in 1995. Following the sale of Abbeyleix, in December 2001 the Irish Independent reported that Lord de Vesci continued to own approximately 1,800 acres in County Laois through a trust.

=== Vesey baronets, of Abbeyleix (1698) ===
- Sir Thomas Vesey, 1st Baronet (died 1730)
- Sir John Denny Vesey, 2nd Baronet (died 1761) (created Baron Knapton in 1750)

=== Baron Knapton (1750) ===
- John Denny Vesey, 1st Baron Knapton (died 1761)
- Thomas Vesey, 2nd Baron Knapton (1735–1804) (created Viscount de Vesci in 1776)

=== Viscount de Vesci (1776) ===
- Thomas Vesey, 1st Viscount de Vesci (1735–1804)
- John Vesey, 2nd Viscount de Vesci (1771–1855)
- Thomas Vesey, 3rd Viscount de Vesci (1803–1875)
- John Robert William Vesey, 4th Viscount de Vesci (1844–1903) (created Baron de Vesci [UK] in 1884)
- Ivo Richard Vesey, 5th Viscount de Vesci (1881–1958)
- John Eustace Vesey, 6th Viscount de Vesci (1919–1983)
- Thomas Eustace Vesey, 7th Viscount de Vesci (born 1955)

The heir apparent is the present holder's second son, Hon. Oliver Ivo Vesey (born 1991). (Note: The eldest son, Damian Brian John Vesey, is not in the line of succession, because he was born before his parents married.)

== Holders ==
The first viscount was Thomas Vesey, the 2nd Baron Knapton.

The second viscount was the son of the first viscount and a Member of the Irish House of Commons for Maryborough. He sat in the House of Lords as an Irish representative peer from 1839 to 1855, and served as Lord Lieutenant of Queen's County between 1831 and 1855.

The third viscount represented Queen's County in the House of Commons as a Conservative and was an Irish representative peer from 1857 to 1875.

The fourth viscount served as Lord Lieutenant of Queen's County from 1883 to 1903. In 1884, the fourth Viscount was created Baron de Vesci, of Abbey Leix in the Queen's County, in the Peerage of the United Kingdom, which gave him an automatic seat in the House of Lords. However, this title became extinct on his death while he was succeeded in the Irish titles by his nephew, the fifth Viscount.

The fifth viscount succeeded to the title in 1903. In 1905, he was a lieutenant in the Irish Guards. He was an Irish representative peer from 1909 to 1958. On his death, the titles passed to his nephew, the sixth viscount.

The seventh viscount was Thomas Vesey, the son of the sixth viscount. He succeeded his father to the title in 1983. The 7th viscount was the son of Susan Anne Armstrong-Jones, sister of Antony Armstrong-Jones, the Earl of Snowdon.

=== Male-line family tree ===
Male-line family tree, Vesey baronets, Barons Knapton and Viscounts de Vesci.

Sir Thomas Vesey; 1st Baronet died 1730
Baron Knapton
John Vesey; 1st Baron Knapton; 2nd Baronet died 1761
Viscount de Vesci
Thomas Vesey; 1st Viscount de Vesci; 2nd Baron Knapton; 1735–1804
John Vesey; 2nd Viscount de Vesci; 1771–1855
Thomas Vesey; 3rd Viscount de Vesci; 1803–1875
Baron de Vesci (UK)
John Vesey; 4th Viscount de Vesci; 1844–1903	Capt. Hon. Eustace Vesey; 1851–1886
Barony de Vesci extinct
Eustace Vesey; 1878–1882	Yvo Vesey; 5th Viscount de Vesci; 1881–1958	Lt Col. Hon. (Note: The 5th Viscount's brothers were allowed by a warrant of precedence from the King to use the style of Honourable, because their father would have held the peerage but for his predeceasing the previous holder.); Osbert Vesey; 1884–1957	Col. Hon. Thomas Vesey; 1885–1946
John Vesey; 6th Viscount de Vesci; 1919–1983
Thomas Vesey; 7th Viscount de Vesci born 1955
Hon. Oliver Vesey born 1991
