= Thomas Vesey (archdeacon) =

Archdeacon of Armagh (c. 1600s)

Thomas Vesey (some sources Vezey) was Archdeacon of Armagh from 1655 to 1662; and again from 1663 to 1669.

Vesey was born in England and educated at Trinity College, Dublin. He held livings at Maghera and Ballyscullion.
