= Sir Thomas Vesey, 1st Baronet =

Irish bishop (died 1730)

Sir Thomas Vesey, 1st Baronet (1668?–1730), was an Anglo-Irish clergyman. He was Bishop of Ossory from 1714 to 1730.

He was born at Cork, Ireland, when his father, John Vesey, later Archbishop of Tuam, was Dean of Cork. He was educated at Eton and Christ Church, Oxford, and became a fellow of Oriel College. His mother was John's second wife Anne Muschamp. He married Mary, only surviving daughter and heiress of Denny Muschamp, Esq., of Horsley, Surrey, and his wife Elizabeth Boyle, and, through her, came into a considerable estate. Mary was a cousin on his mother's side. On 13 July (patent 28 Sept.) 1698, he was created a baronet of Abbeyleix in the Baronetage of Ireland.

Taking holy orders, he was ordained as a priest on 24 June 1700, and, becoming chaplain to James Butler, 2nd Duke of Ormonde, and Archdeacon of Tuam, was by his influence advanced to the bishopric of Killaloe on 12 June 1713. The following year he became Bishop of Ossory.

He died on 6 August 1730, and was buried in St. Anne's Church, Dublin. His only son and heir, John Vesey, was created Baron Knapton in 1750 and was the ancestor to the Viscounts de Vesci and William Vesey-FitzGerald, 2nd Baron FitzGerald and Vesey. Elizabeth Vesey was his daughter. He also had another daughter, Letitia (1708–1747), who married Ven. Charles Meredyth.

Baronetage of Ireland
New creation	Baronet (of Abbeyleix); 1698–1730	Succeeded by John Vesey
