= Abbeyleix =

Town in County Laois, Ireland

Abbeyleix Mainistir Laoise
- Town
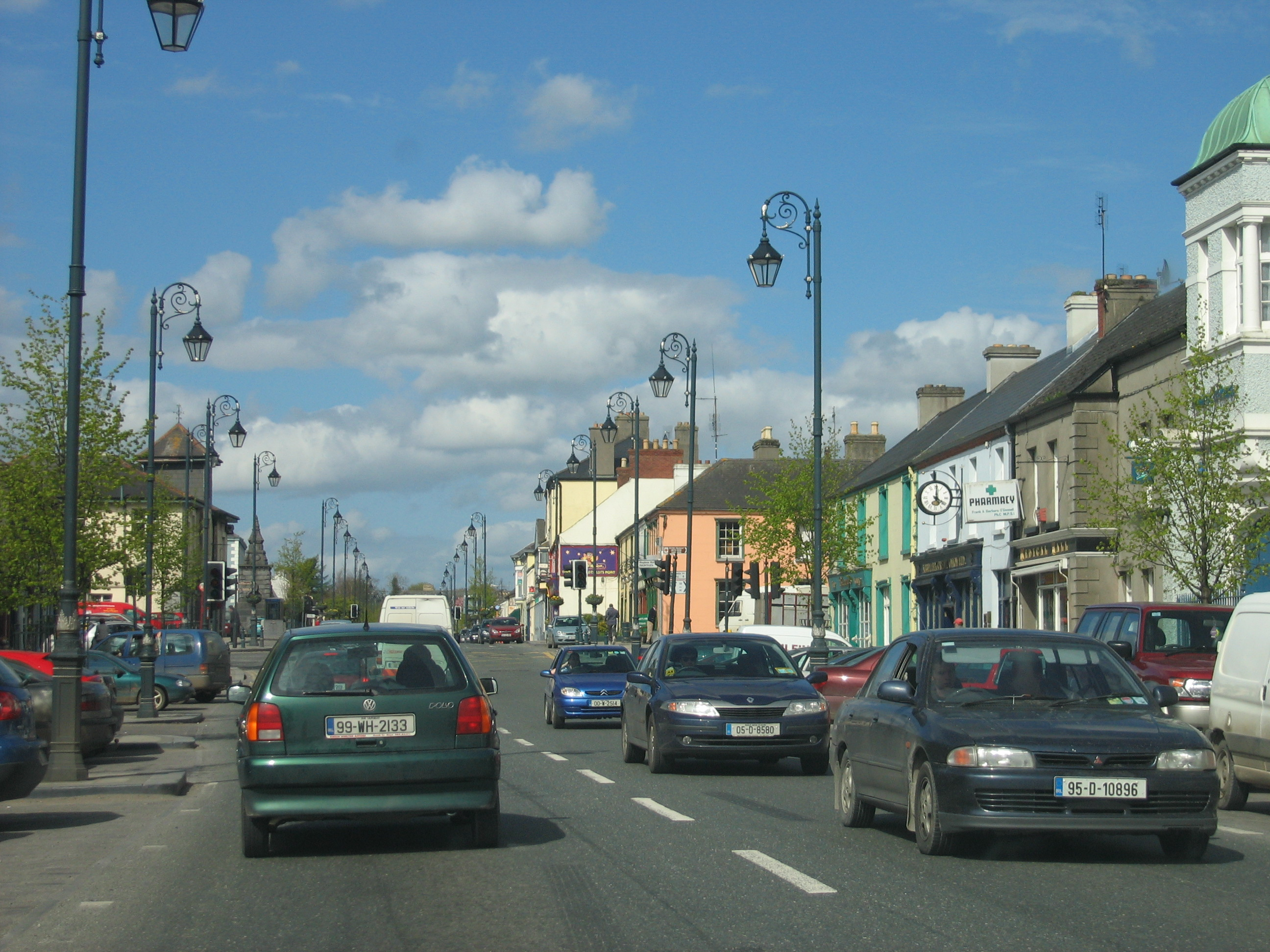
- Main Street

- Location in Ireland
- Coordinates: 52.914°N 7.349°W
- Country: Ireland
- Province: Leinster
- County: County Laois
- Elevation: 95 m (312 ft)

Population (2022)
  - Total: 1,897
- Irish Grid Reference: S435850

Abbeyleix (/ˈæbiˌliːks/; Irish: Mainistir Laoise, meaning 'Laois Abbey') is a town in County Laois, Ireland, located around 14 kilometres (8.7 mi) south of the county town of Portlaoise. Abbeyleix is in a civil parish of the same name.

Abbeyleix was formerly located on the N8, the main road from Dublin to Cork. At one point, up to 15,000 vehicles passed along the town's main street every day. Since May 2010, however, the town has been bypassed by the M8 motorway, with the former N8 consequently downgraded to the N77 national secondary road, and R639 regional road.

Abbeyleix was named Ireland's Tidiest Town in 2023.

== History ==
There was a settlement at Abbeyleix as early as 1183, that grew up near the River Nore, around the Cistercian monastery - which gives the town its name.

The monastery, known as Clonkyne Leix or De Lege Dei, was reputedly founded about the year 600 AD, but of which there is limited account until 1183, when it was refounded and dedicated to the Blessed Virgin by Conogher or Corcheger O'More (Conor Cucoigcriche). O'More placed in it monks of the Cistercian order from Baltinglass, County Wicklow.

The lordship of Feranamanagh (i.e. the Monk's land), consisting of the parish of Abbeyleix, is shown on a map of the territories of Leix and Offaly from 1561.

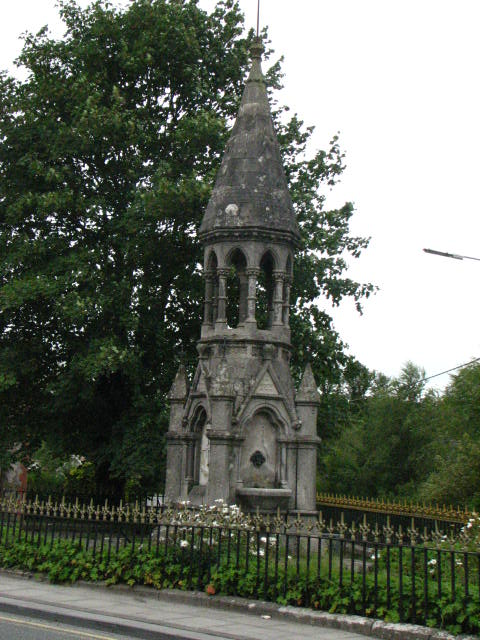
Monument to John Vesey, 2nd Viscount de Vesci

Modern Abbeyleix is one of the oldest planned estate towns in Ireland. It was largely built in the 18th century by Viscount de Vesci. The regular flooding of the River Nore made the town an unhealthy place to live. Around 1790, John Vesey determined that the location of the town was not suitable for his tenants, and began to design a new one. The old town was levelled, and the residents moved to the new one. A memorial to the 2nd Viscount de Vesci, paid for by subscriptions, is in the town center. It features a water trough for horses.

Today, there are many historical structures standing in and around the town - ancient ring forts, burial grounds, churches and estate houses. The town once had a carpet factory, established in 1904 by Yvo de Vesci, the 5th Viscount – notably producing some of the carpets used on the RMS Olympic and RMS Titanic.

== Transport ==
=== Road ===
The N8 road to Cork passed through Abbeyleix prior to the opening of the M8 motorway in 2010. With the opening of the M8 the N77 road was extended along the route of the former N8 from Durrow to Portlaoise. Access to the M8 from Abbeyleix is also provided via the R433 road.

=== Rail ===
Abbeyleix railway station, on the line from Portlaoise to Kilkenny, opened on 1 March 1865 and closed on 1 January 1963.

=== Bus ===
Both Bus Éireann's Expressway service and the Aircoach service, between Dublin and Cork, ceased to serve Abbeyleix in 2012. As an interim measure, until August 2012, Bus Éireann operated a shuttle service (route 128) to connect with Expressway services at Portlaoise. Slieve Bloom Coaches also have a route from Borris-in-Ossory to Portlaoise which serves the town.

The TFI Local Link 858a and 858b bus services connect Abbeyleix to Portlaoise and Cashel and Thurles. and also has a 822 service that connects Abbeyleix to Mountrath and Carlow.

== Amenities ==
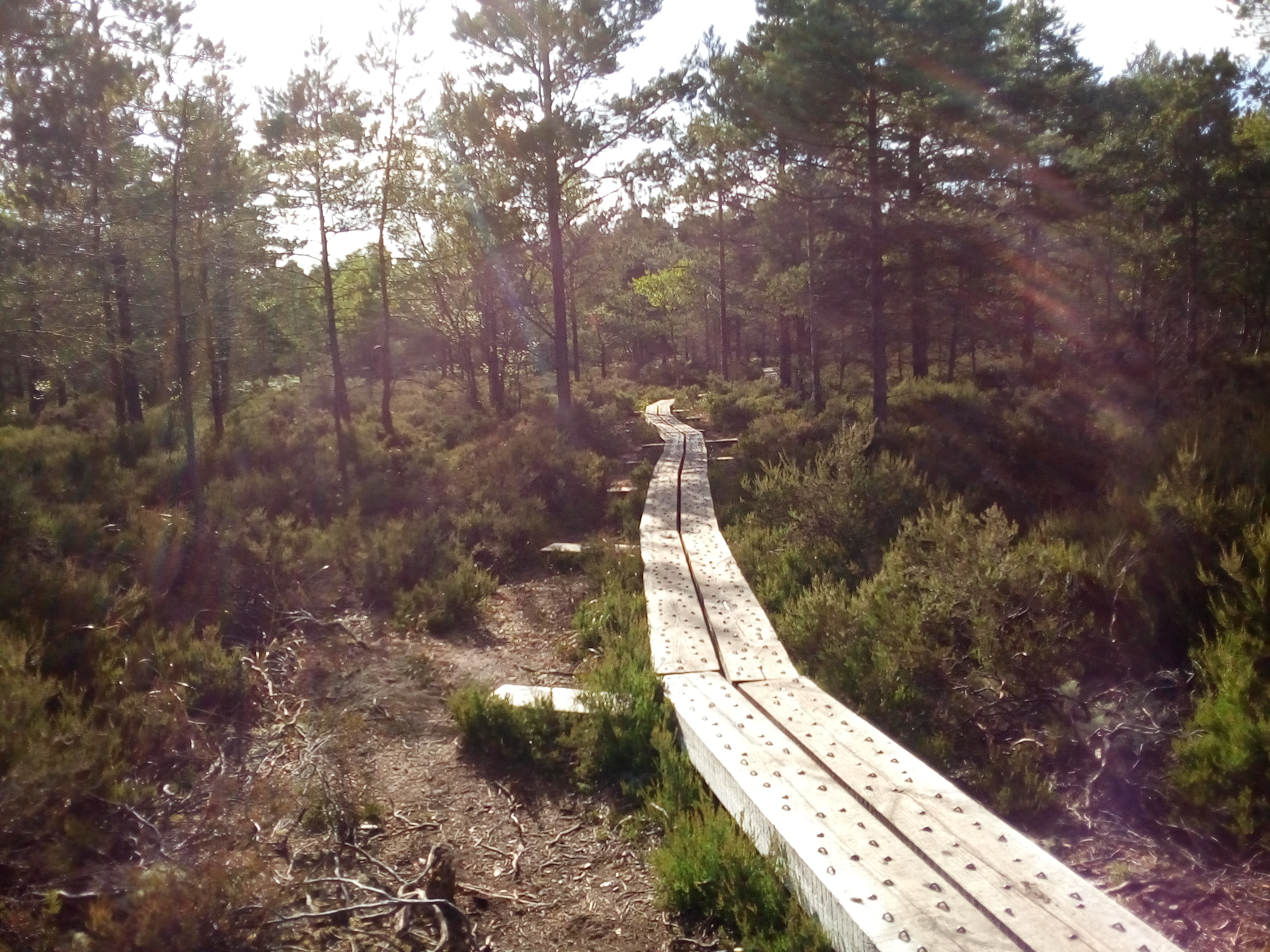
Abbeyleix Bog Walk

There is a district hospital in the town, and a number of shops and pubs. Father Breen Park has fields for soccer and other sports, while the adjacent CYMS hall is home to a number of clubs.

The "Lords Walk Loop" is a 2.4 kilometer loop that traces an old walking route taken by the De Vesci Family to reach the local church and railway station.

Killamuck Bog is managed by the Abbeyleix Bog Project which has constructed two looped walks through the bog. The entrance to the bog is located by the Abbeyleix Manor Hotel. The two loops have raised wooden broad walks that traverse through the bog, as well as paths and tracks.

The Abbeyleix Heritage House is a local heritage centre, with visitor information and an exhibition on the county's history and local attractions. Original antique carpets and vintage costumes are on display alongside archaeological and historical artefacts. Heritage House also provides guided tours of the museum and runs workshops throughout the year.

== Buildings of note ==
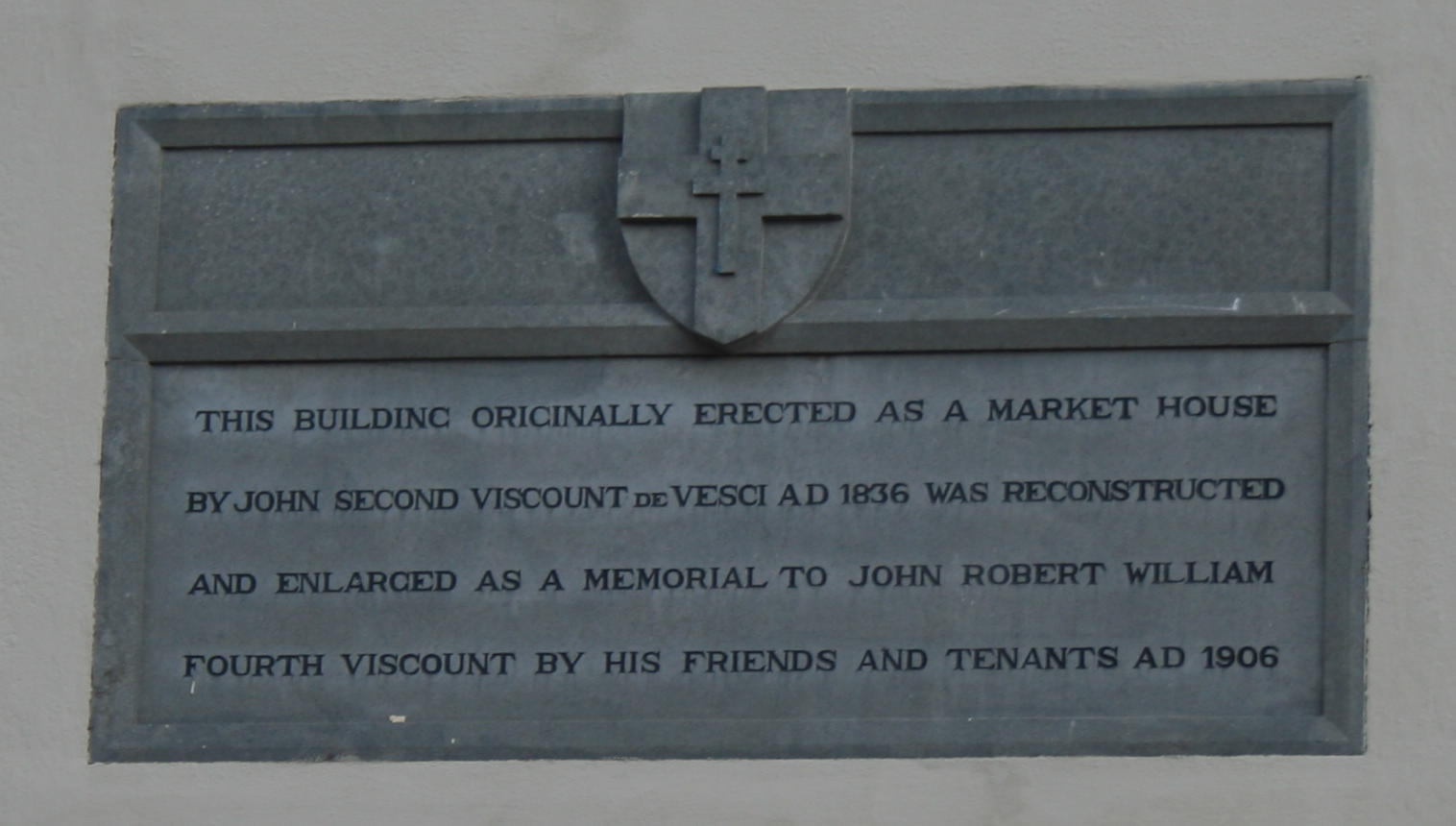
Plaque on Market House

Abbeyleix House and the de Vesci estate (Abbeyleix Estate) is located on the Ballacolla road. As of 2019, the estate was being marketed for sale, with an asking price of €20 million. The house and 1050 acre estate was sold in 2021 for €20 million to Irish entrepreneur John Collinson. Millbrook House which is located beside the de Vesci estate was also purchased by Collinson in 2022.

Within the town, Abbeyleix Market House is a five-bay, four storey building which was previously used as a fire station and library. It has been renovated as a library and exhibition centre. Heritage House is a visitor centre which houses a local history museum. This 19th-century building was once the North Boys School. Both the Market House and Heritage House are listed on the Record of Protected Structures for County Laois.

== Sport ==
Abbeyleix GAA club is the local Gaelic Athletic Association club. Abbeyleix Golf Club and Abbeyleix Lawn Tennis Club were established in 1895 and 1909 respectively. Other sports clubs in the area include a hockey club and soccer (association football) club.

== Notable residents ==
- Francis Bacon (1909–1992), artist
- Sarah "Venie" Barr, (1875–1947) political and community activist
- Sir Edward Massey (1619–1674), English soldier and parliamentarian
- Paul Nunn (1943-1995), mountaineer, author and economic historian, born in Abbeyleix
- Launt Thompson (1833–1894), sculptor

== See also ==
- List of towns and villages in Ireland
- Market Houses in Ireland
