= List of works by William Bruce Ellis Ranken =

William Bruce Ellis Ranken (1881–1941) was an Edwardian aesthete. Ranken's first exhibition in 1904 at the Carfax Gallery in London was well-received by artists and art critics.

== Gallery ==
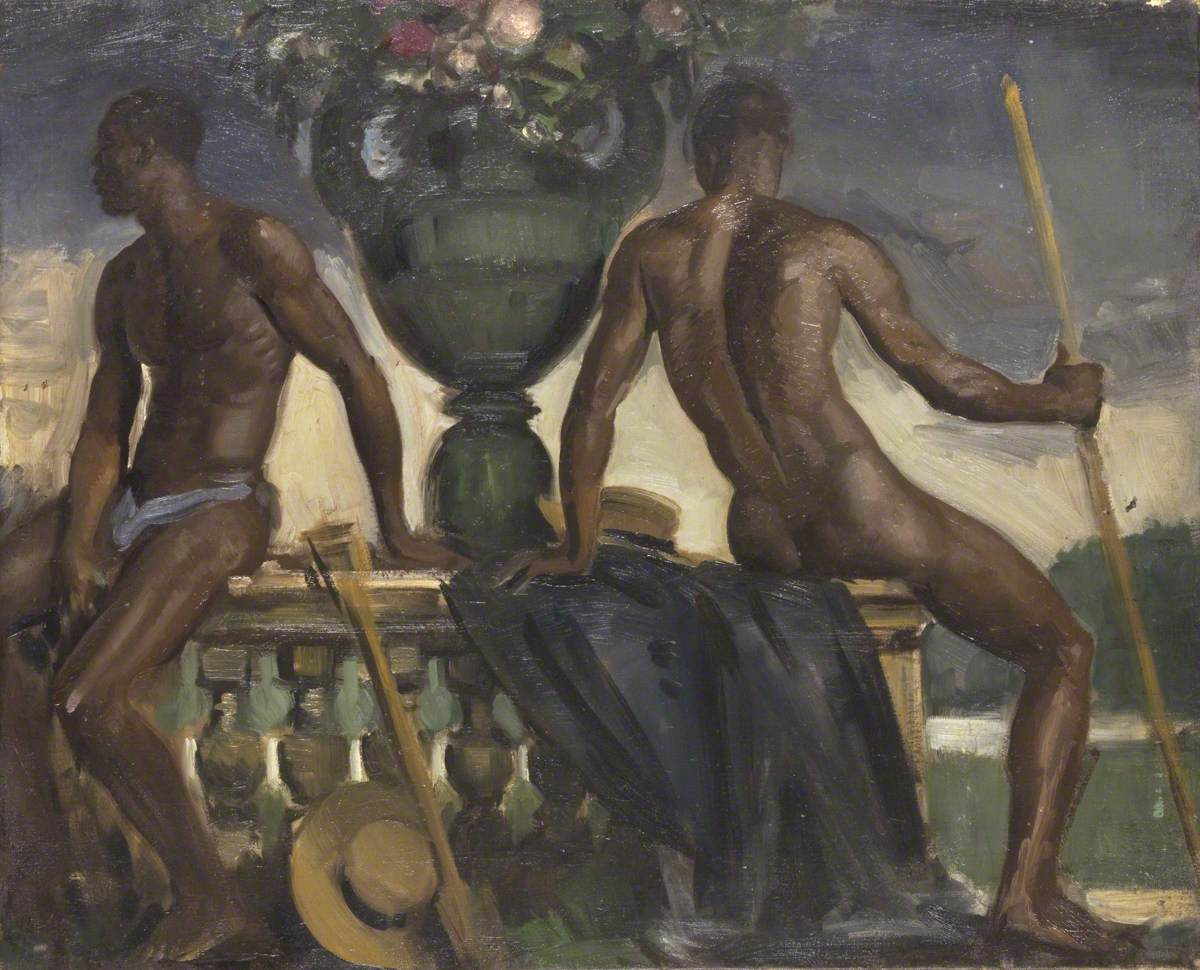
Adam's Work

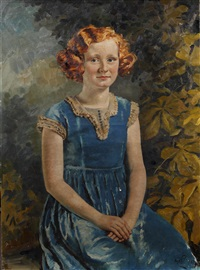
Miss Agnes Ruth "Nancy" Finnie, 1937

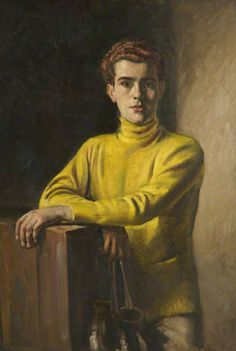
The Amateur Boxer, 1920s

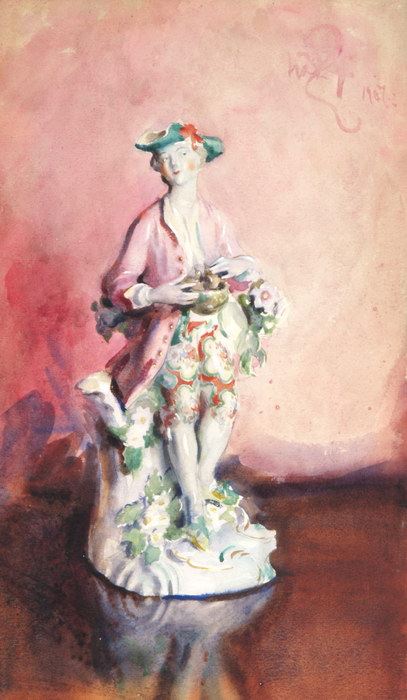
L'Amoureux Myrtil, 1907

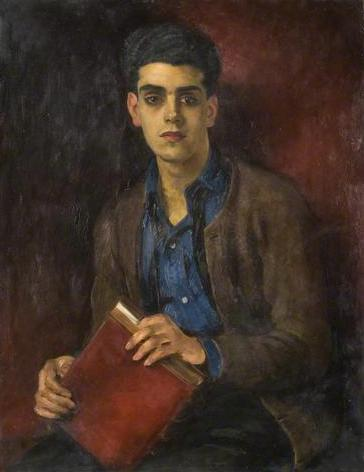
Anglo-Indian Student, ca 1922

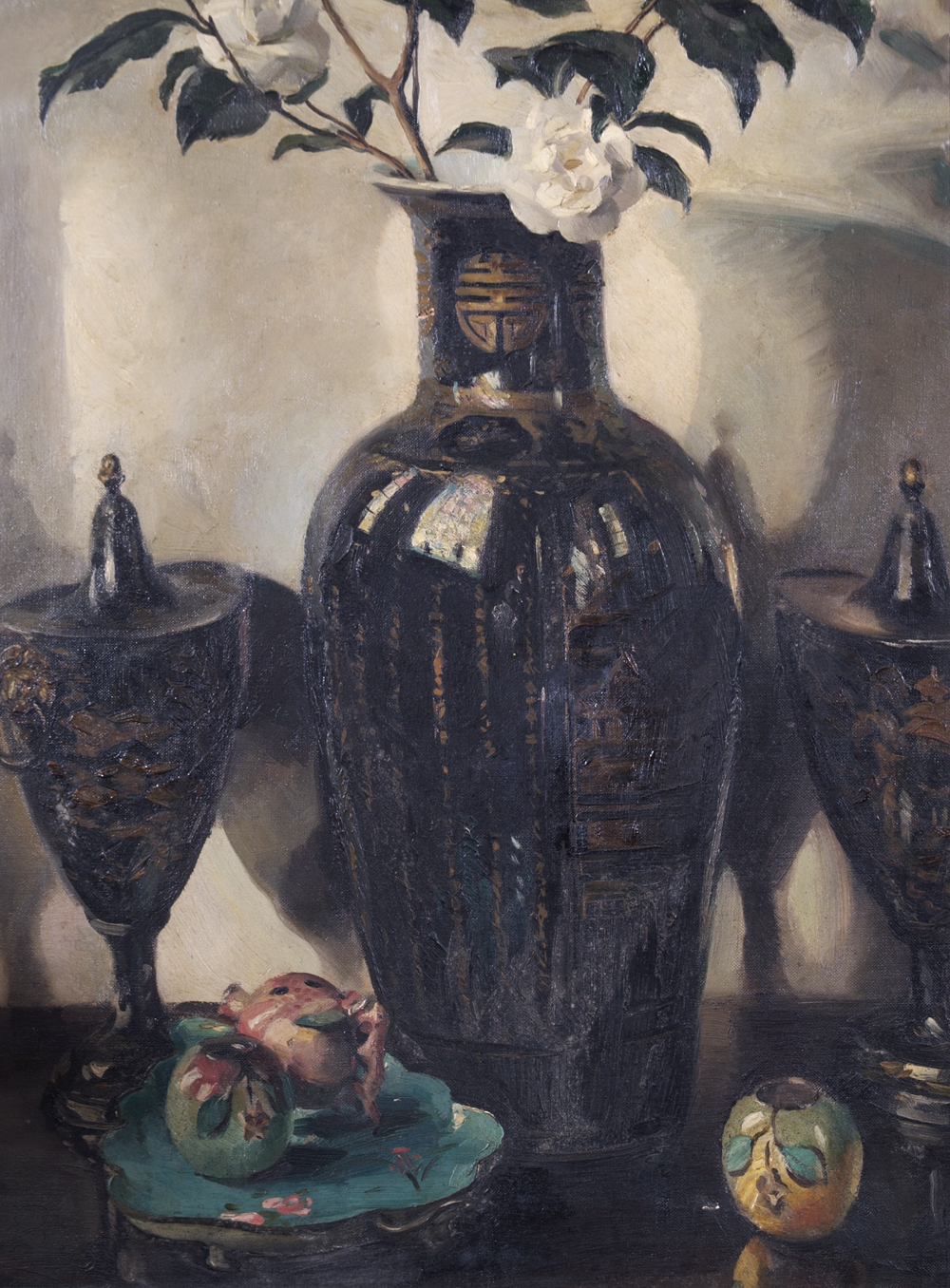
Antique China and Chinese Vase

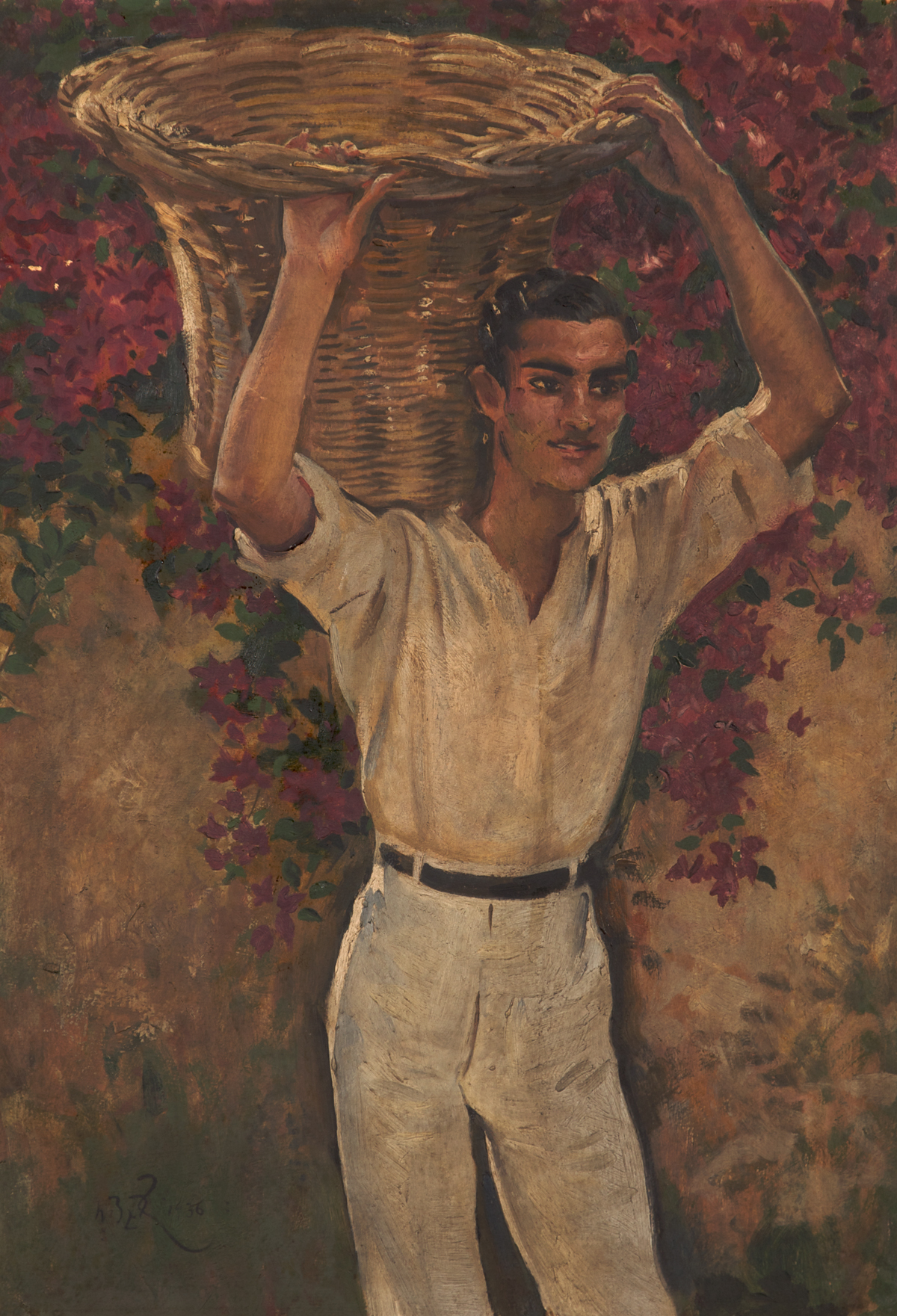
The Baker's Roundsman, Madeira

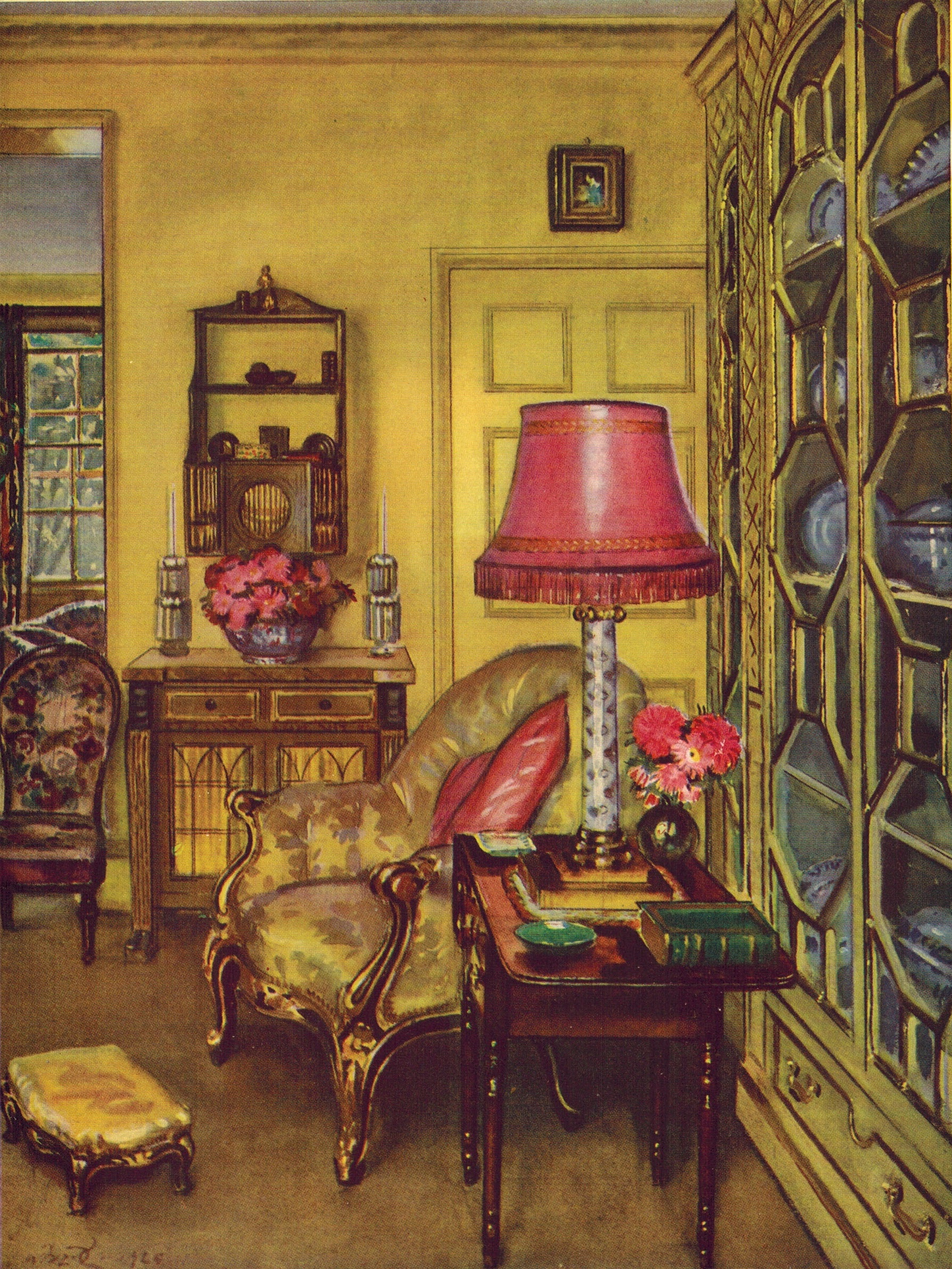
A Yellow Room, Mr Barnard Richardson's House, Colour and Interior Decoration, Country Life, 1926

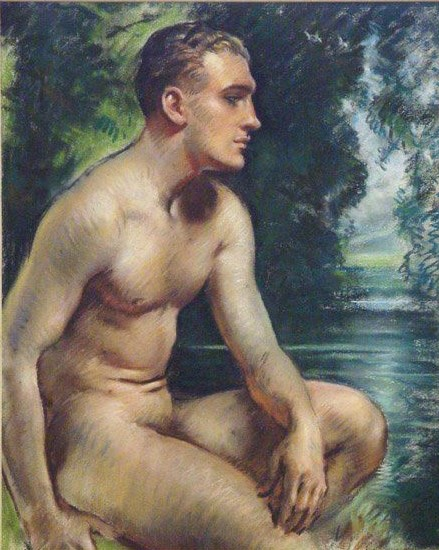
The Bather, 1920s

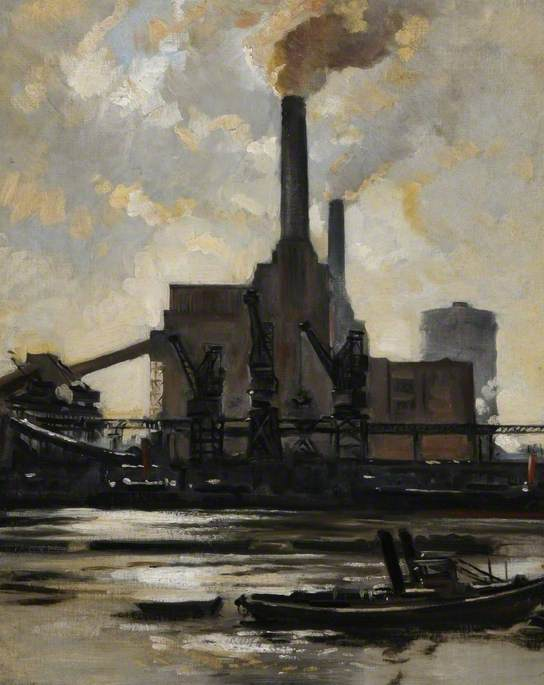
Battersea Power Station, London, 1940

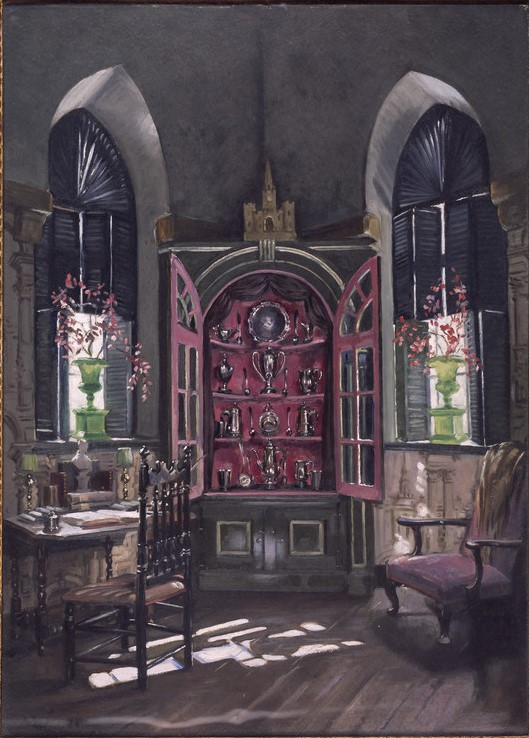
Paul Revere Room (Chapel Chamber), Beauport, Sleeper–McCann House, 1928

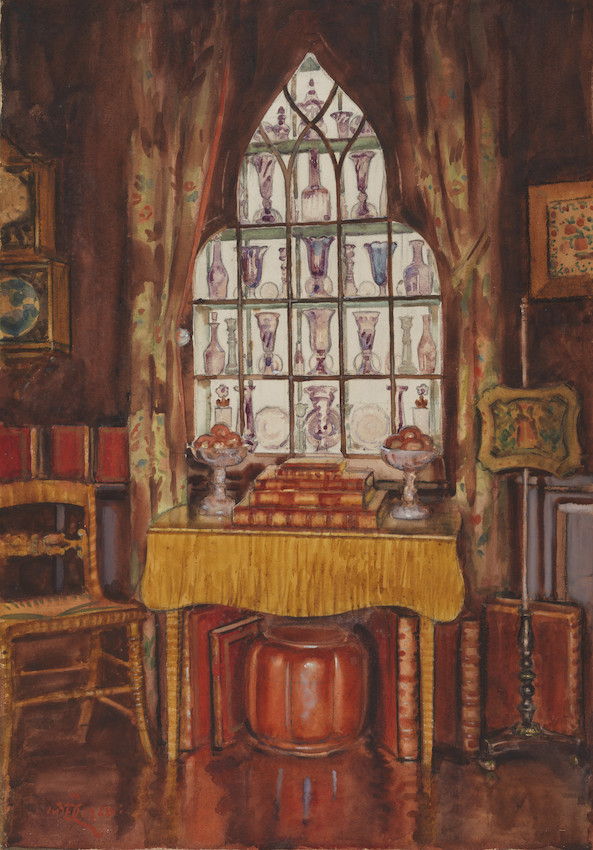
Amethyst Glass passage, Beauport, Sleeper–McCann House, 1928

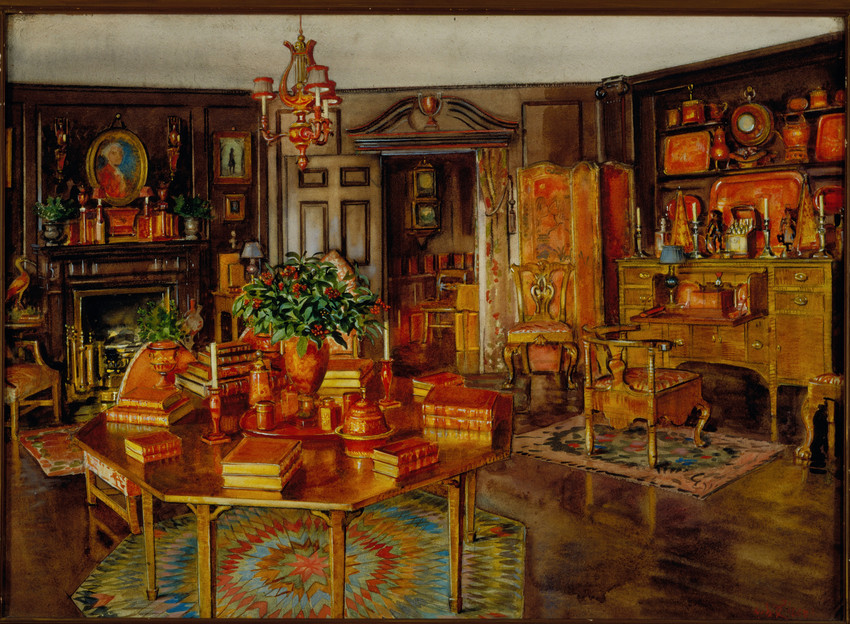
Octagon Room, Beauport, Sleeper–McCann House, 1928

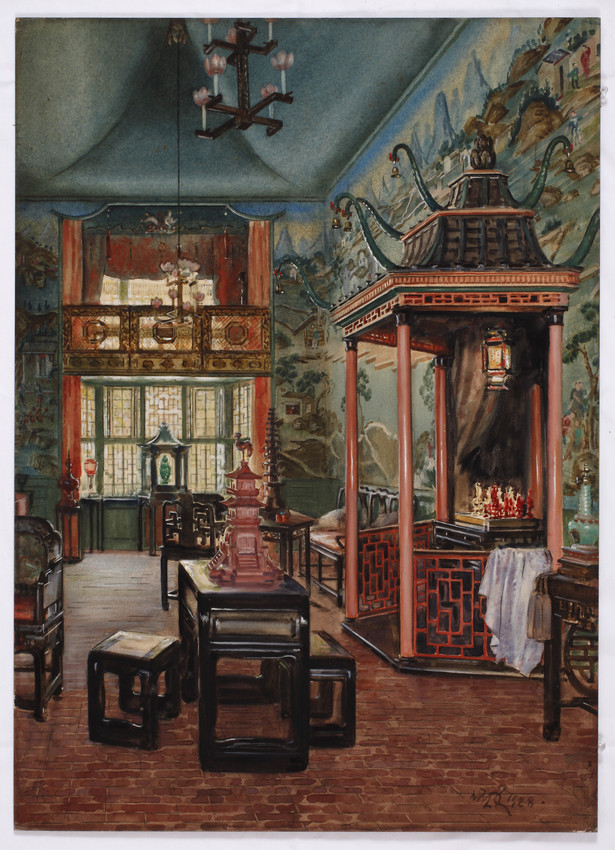
China Trade Room, Beauport, Sleeper–McCann House, 1928

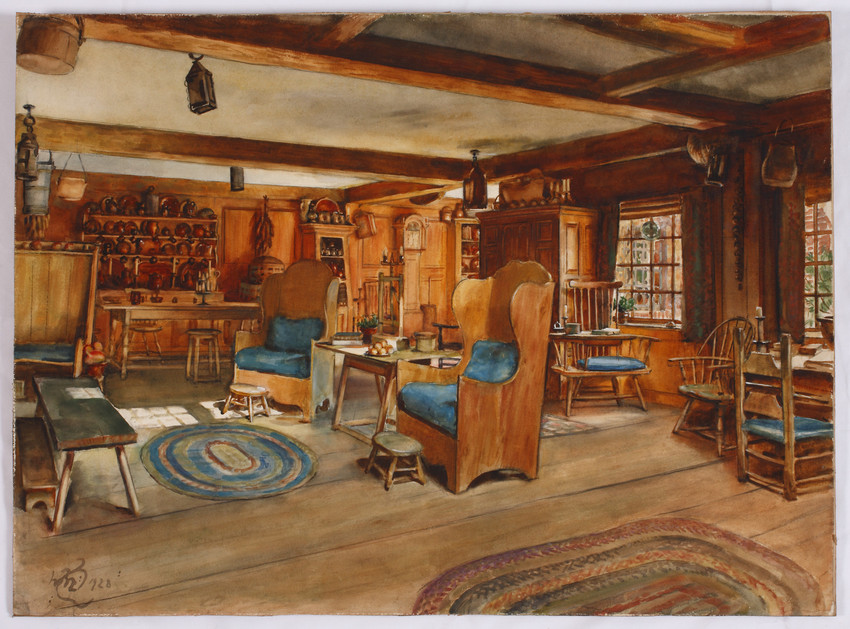
Pine Kitchen, Beauport, Sleeper–McCann House, 1928

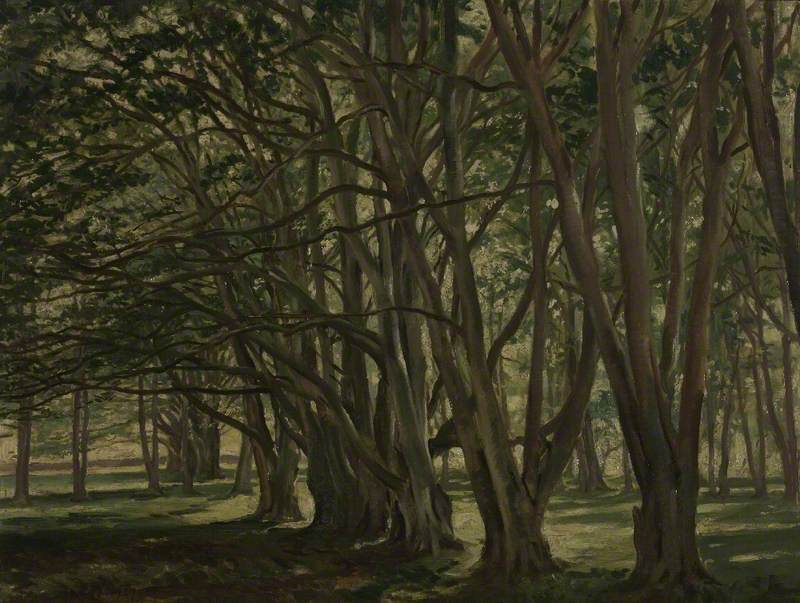
Beech Trees, Carmichael

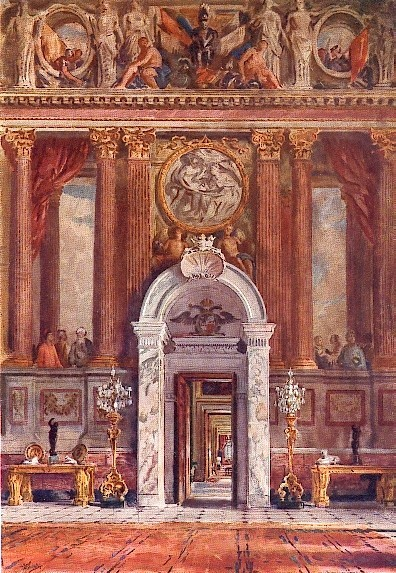
Grand salon, Blenheim Palace, ca 1918

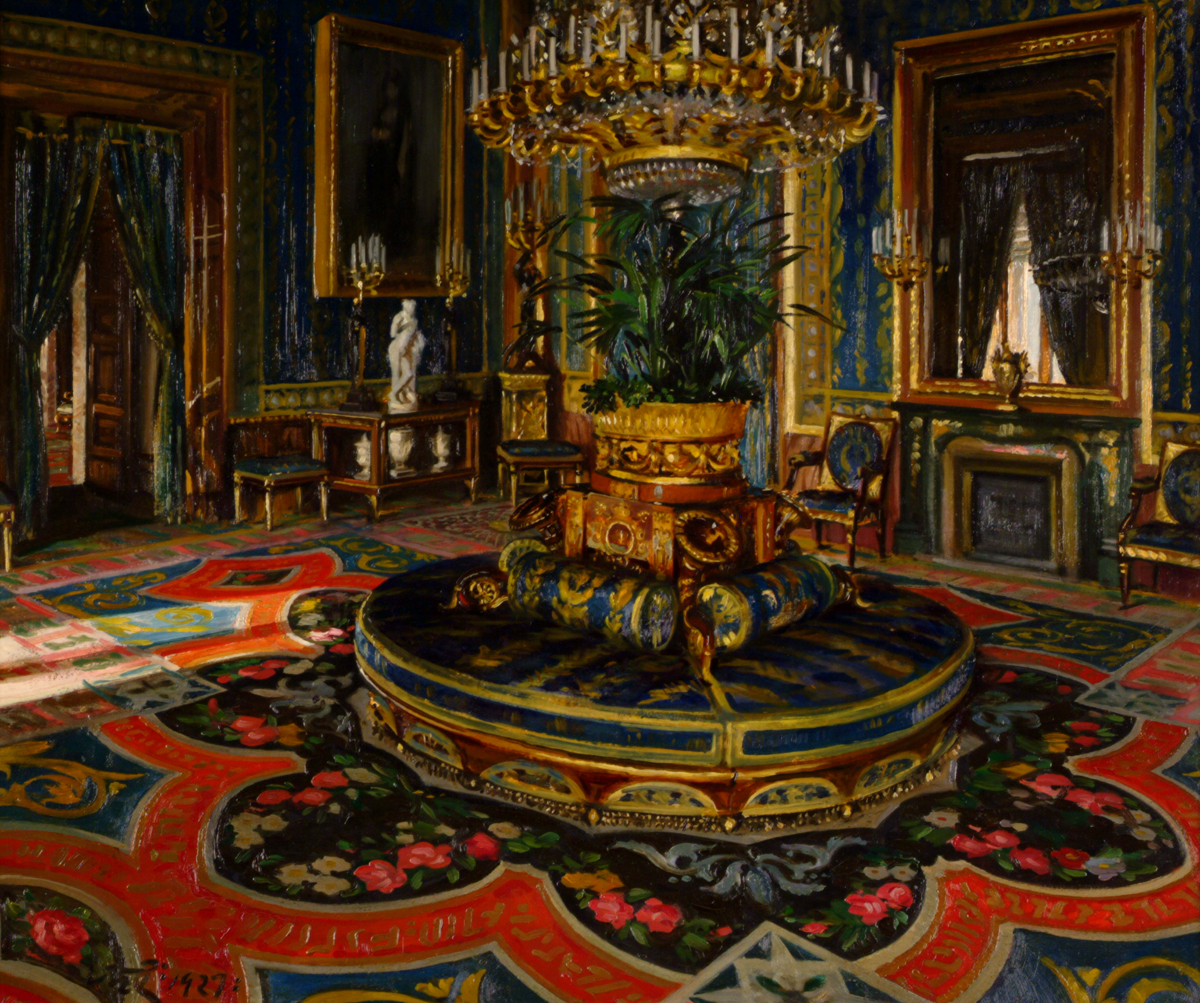
Blue Ante Room, 1927

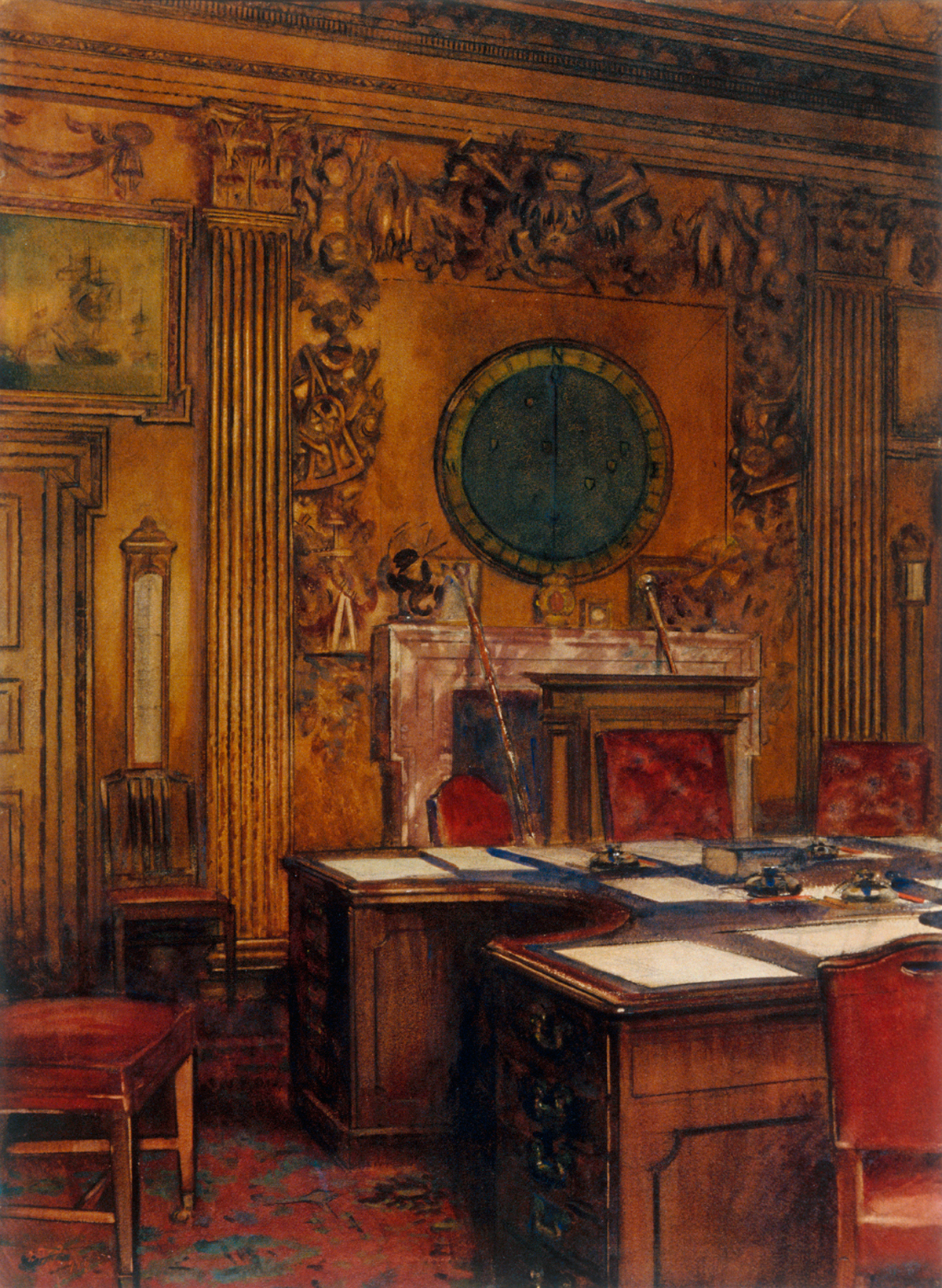
Board Room of the Admiralty, 1918

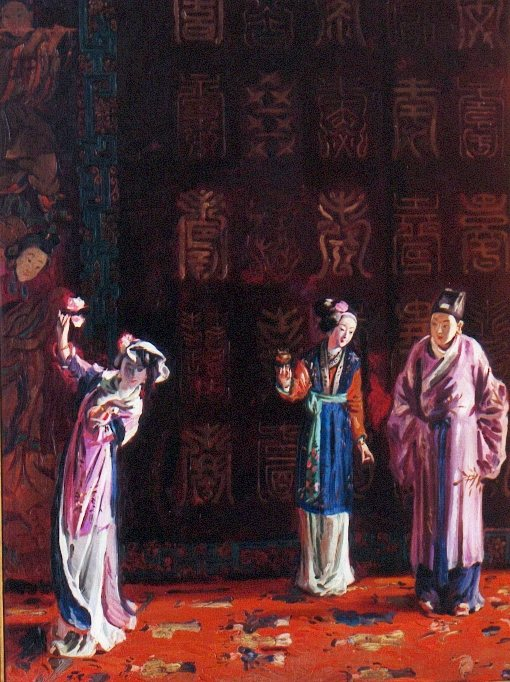
Bribery & Corruption, ca 1915

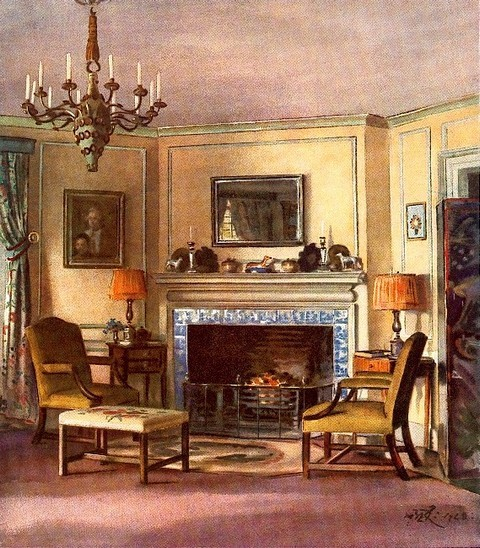
Brick House Farm (Newcomb–Brown Estate), Pleasant Valley, Duchess County, New York, 1928

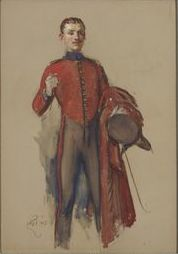
Cadet, 1913

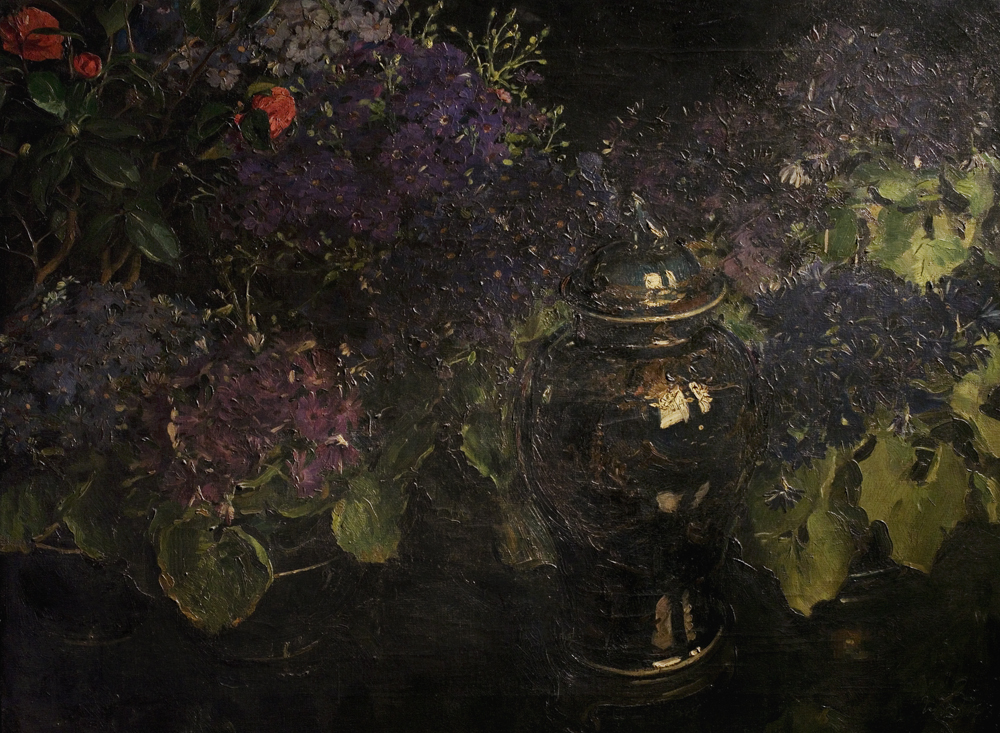
Cinerarias

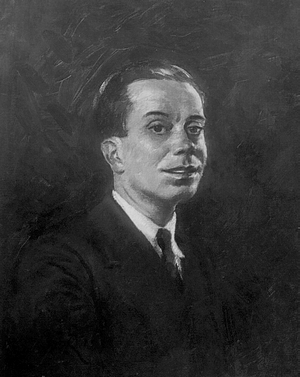
Cole Porter, ca 1933

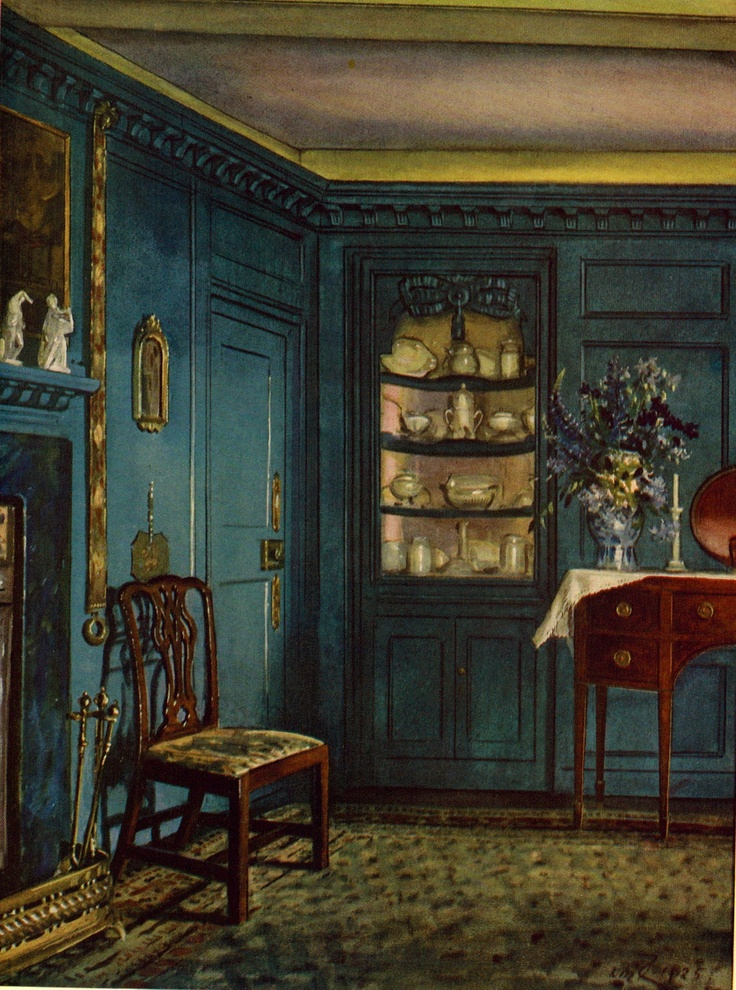
A Blue Room, Colour and Interior Decoration, Country Life, 1926

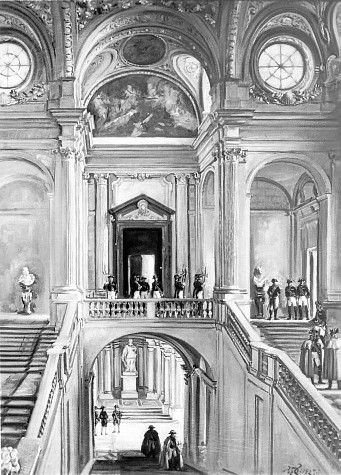
Colour and Interior Decoration, Country Life, 1926

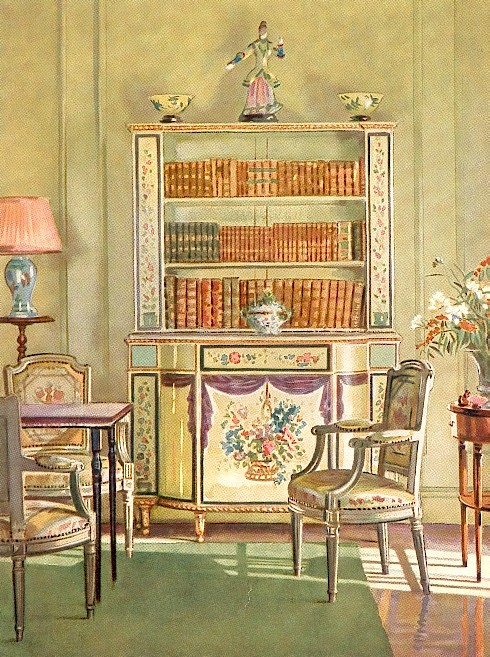
Colour and Interior Decoration, Country Life, 1926

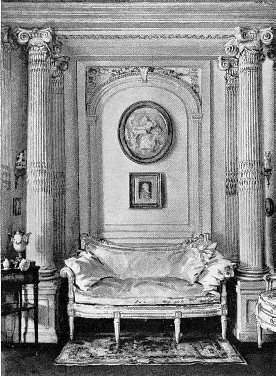
Colour and Interior Decoration, Country Life, 1926

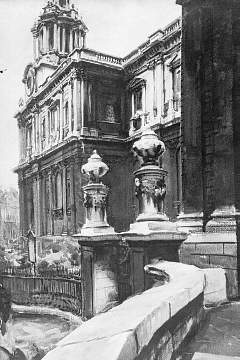
Colour and Interior Decoration, Country Life, 1926

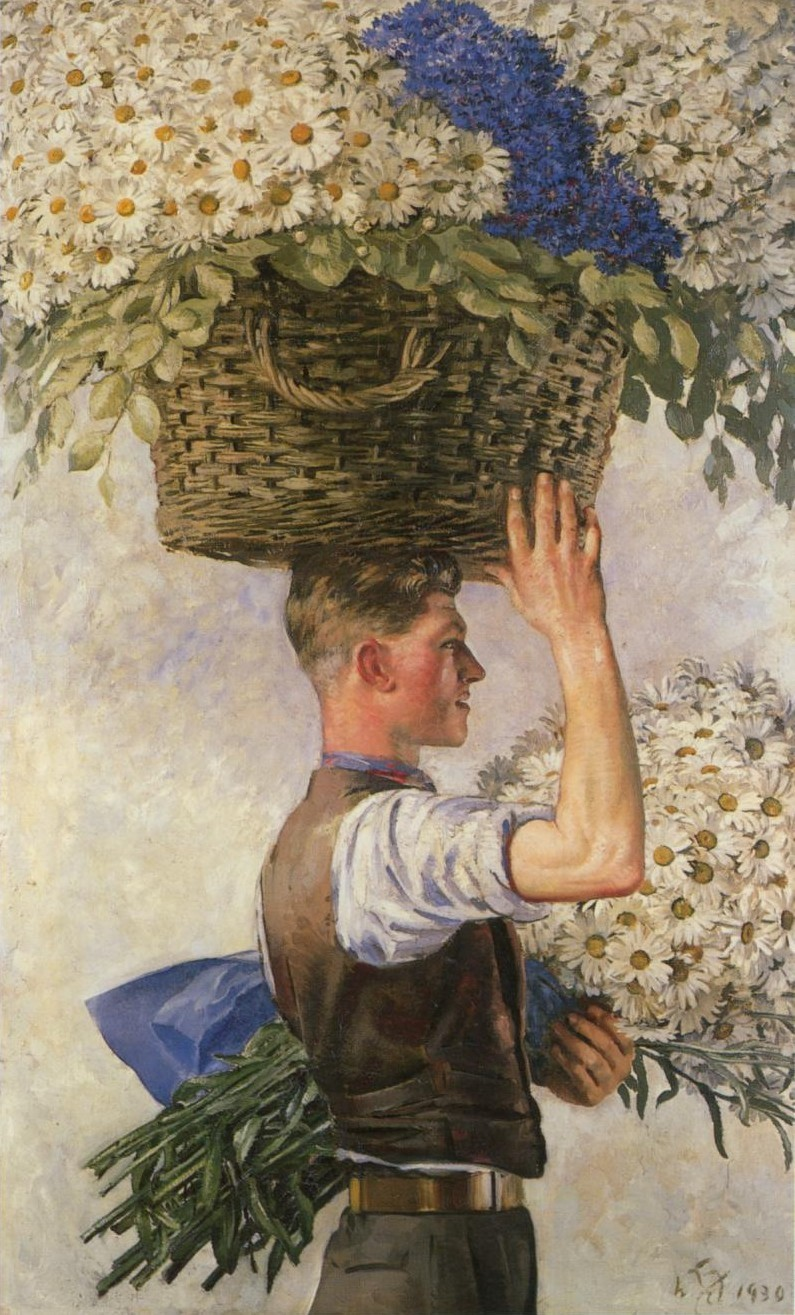
Covent Garden, 1930

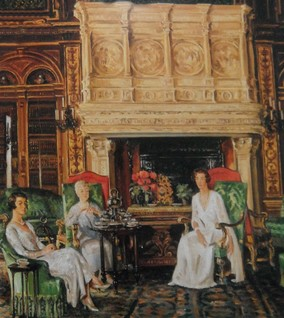
Mrs. Cornelius Vanderbilt II (Alice Claypoole Vanderbilt) and her daughters, Gladys Vanderbilt Széchenyi and Gertrude Vanderbilt Whitney, having tea in the library at The Breakers, Newport, Rhode Island, 1932

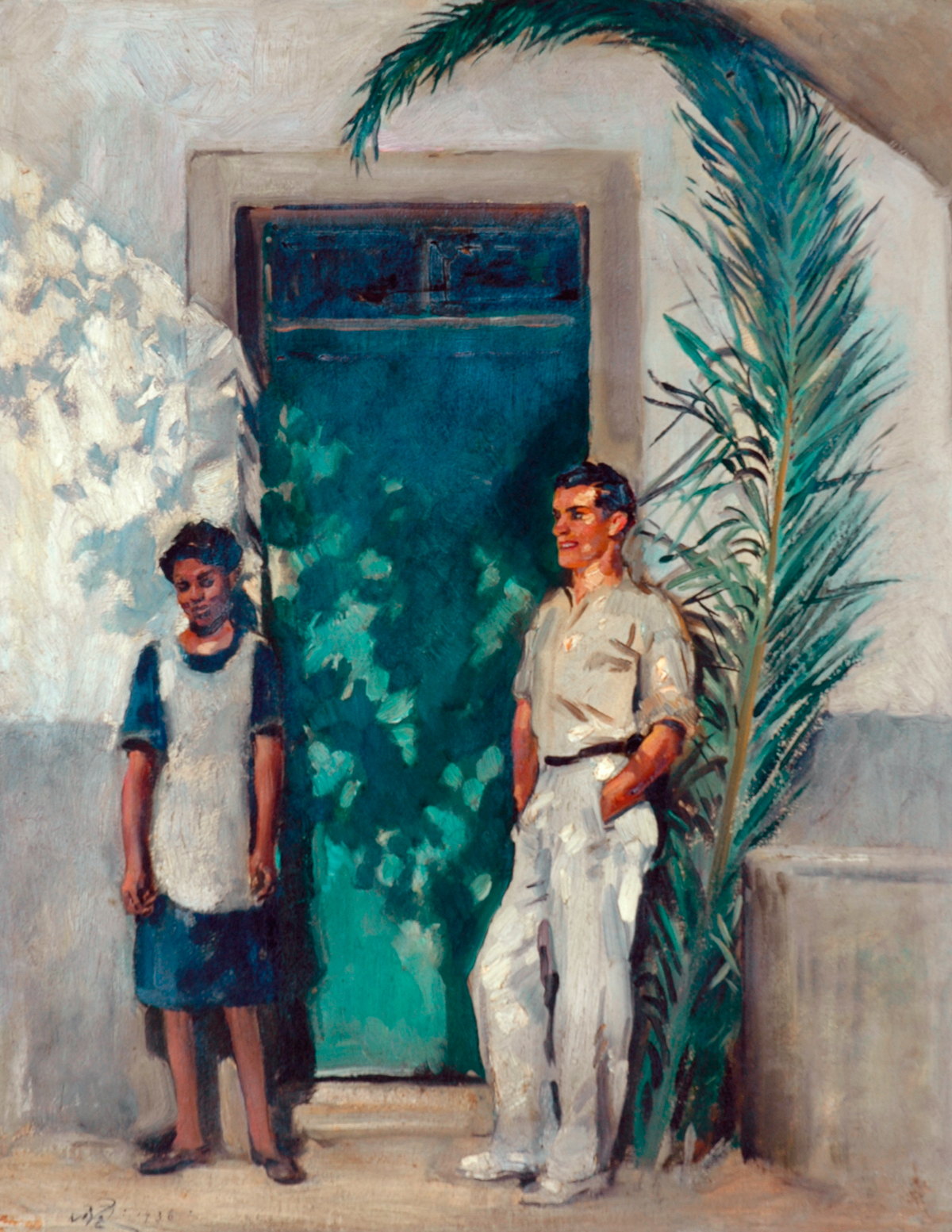
Conversation Piece, Madeira, 1936

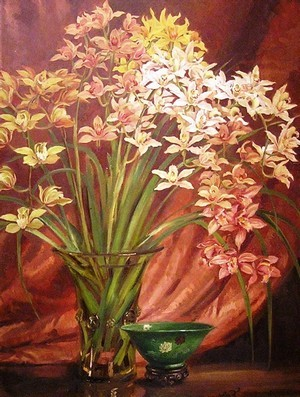
Cymbidium Orchids, 1935

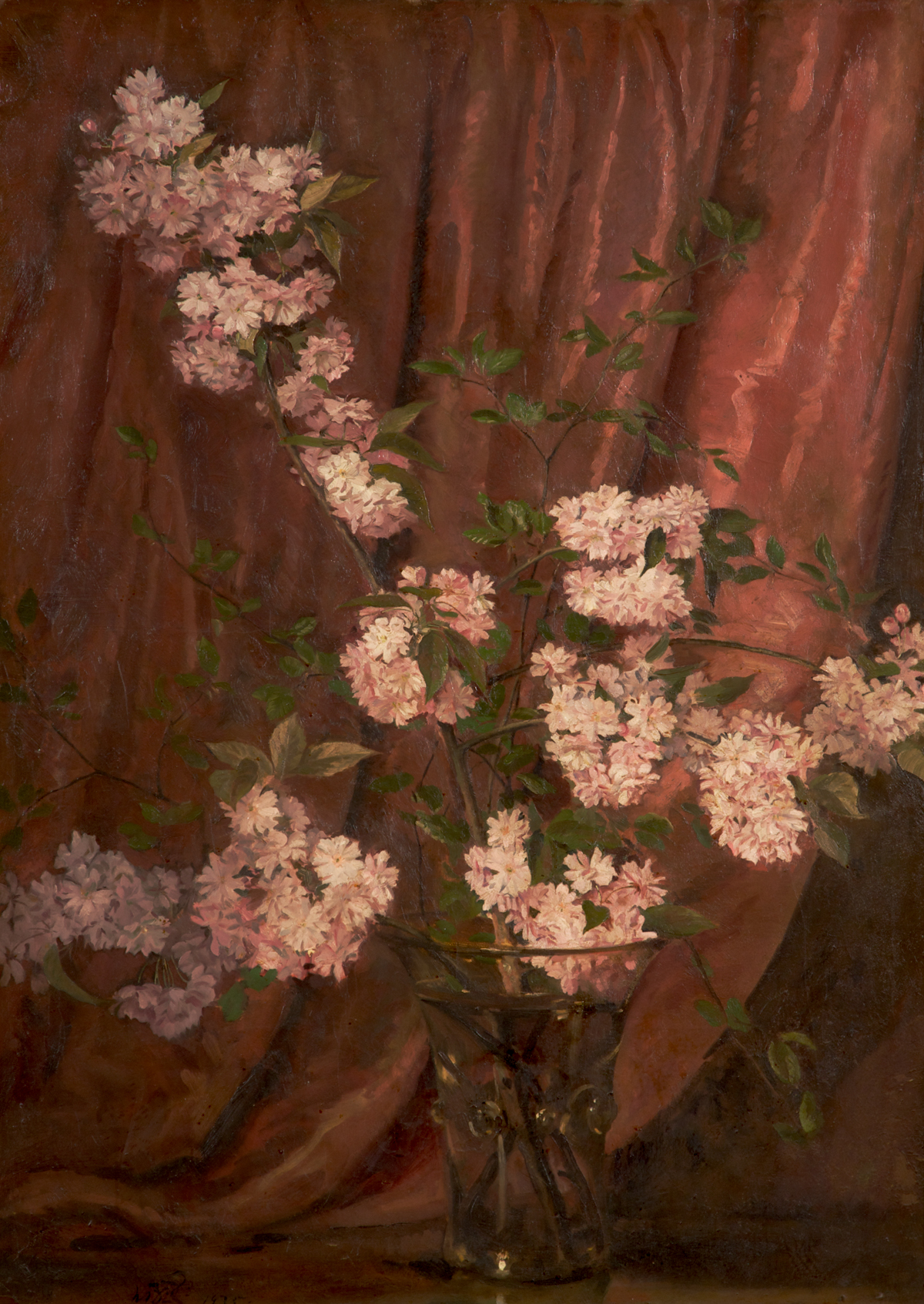
Double Japanese Cherry

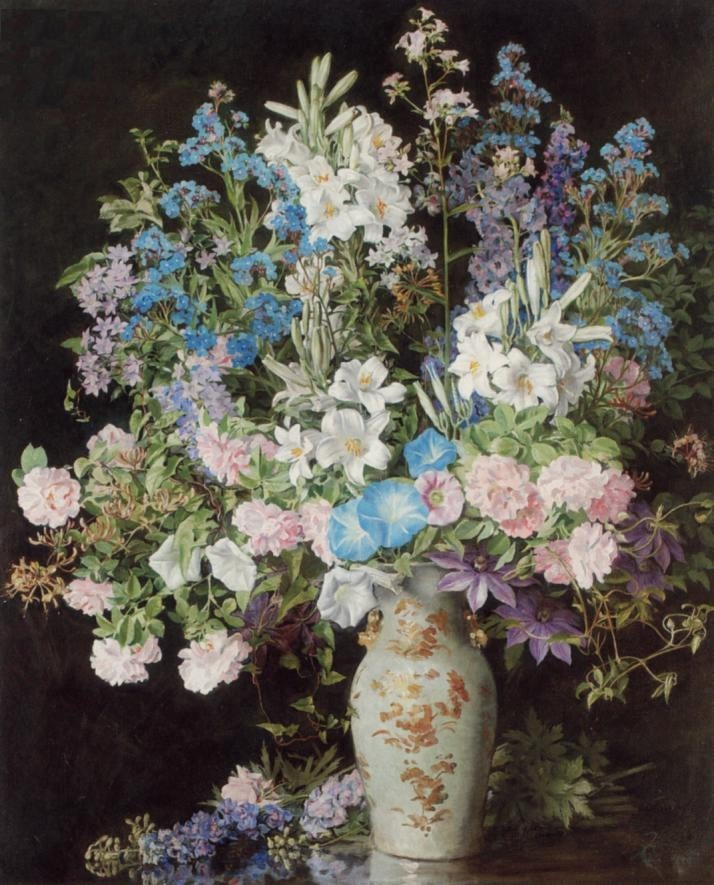
Early Summer, 1940

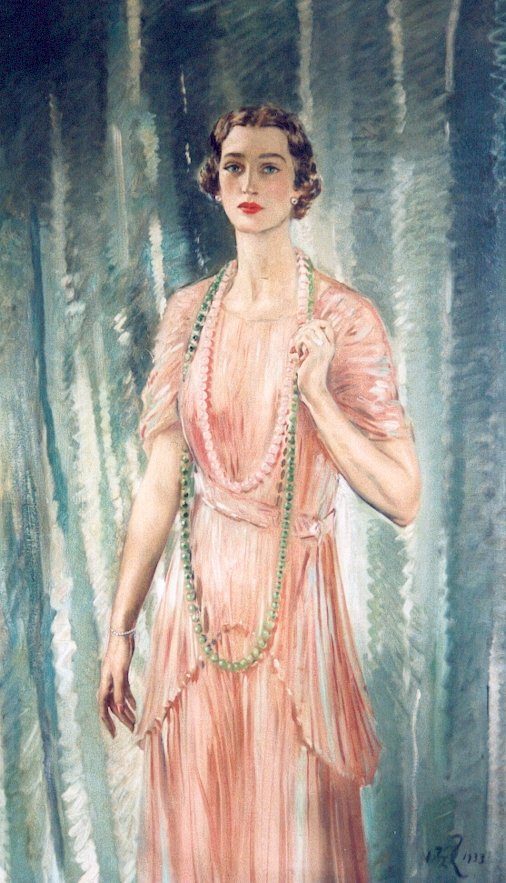
Mrs Edwin D Morgan Jr (Elizabeth Winthrop Emmet), 1933

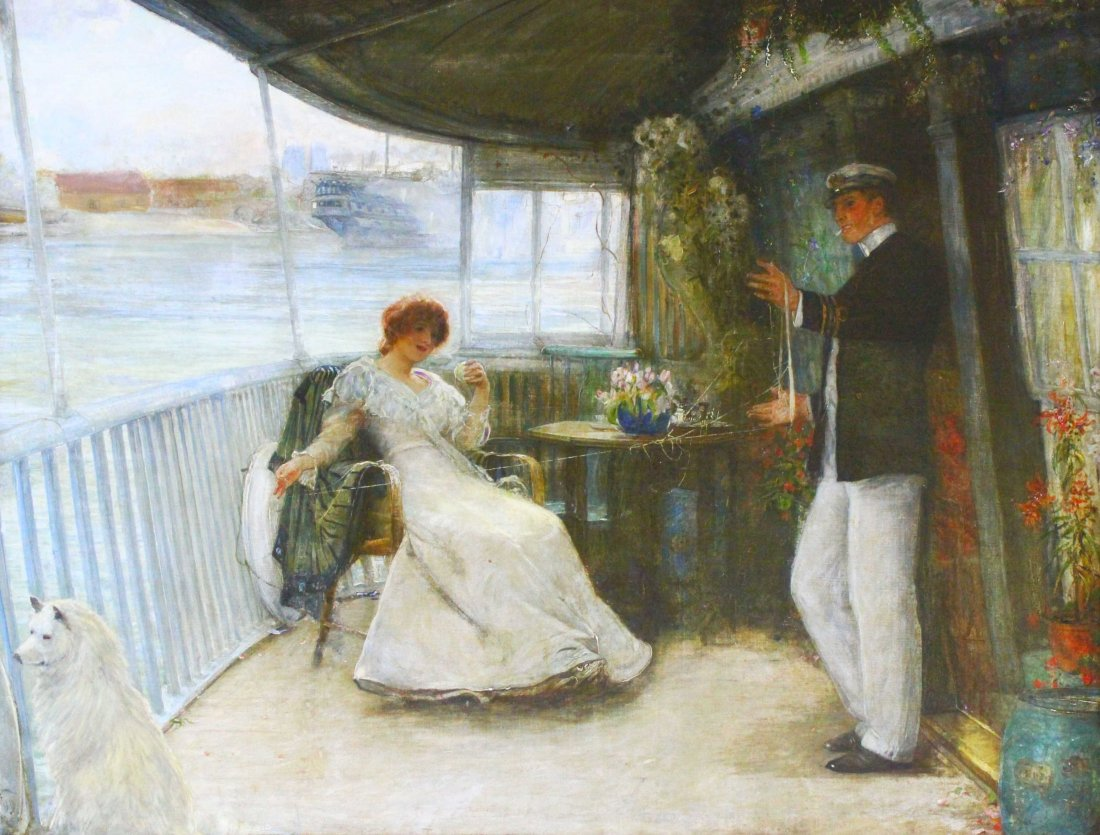
Edwin Dennison Morgan and his wife Elizabeth Moran Morgan, 1899

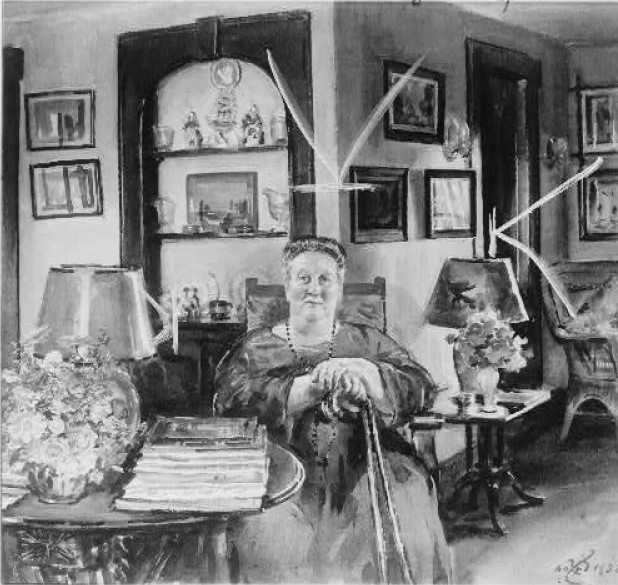
Elisabeth Marbury in her summer home, before 1933

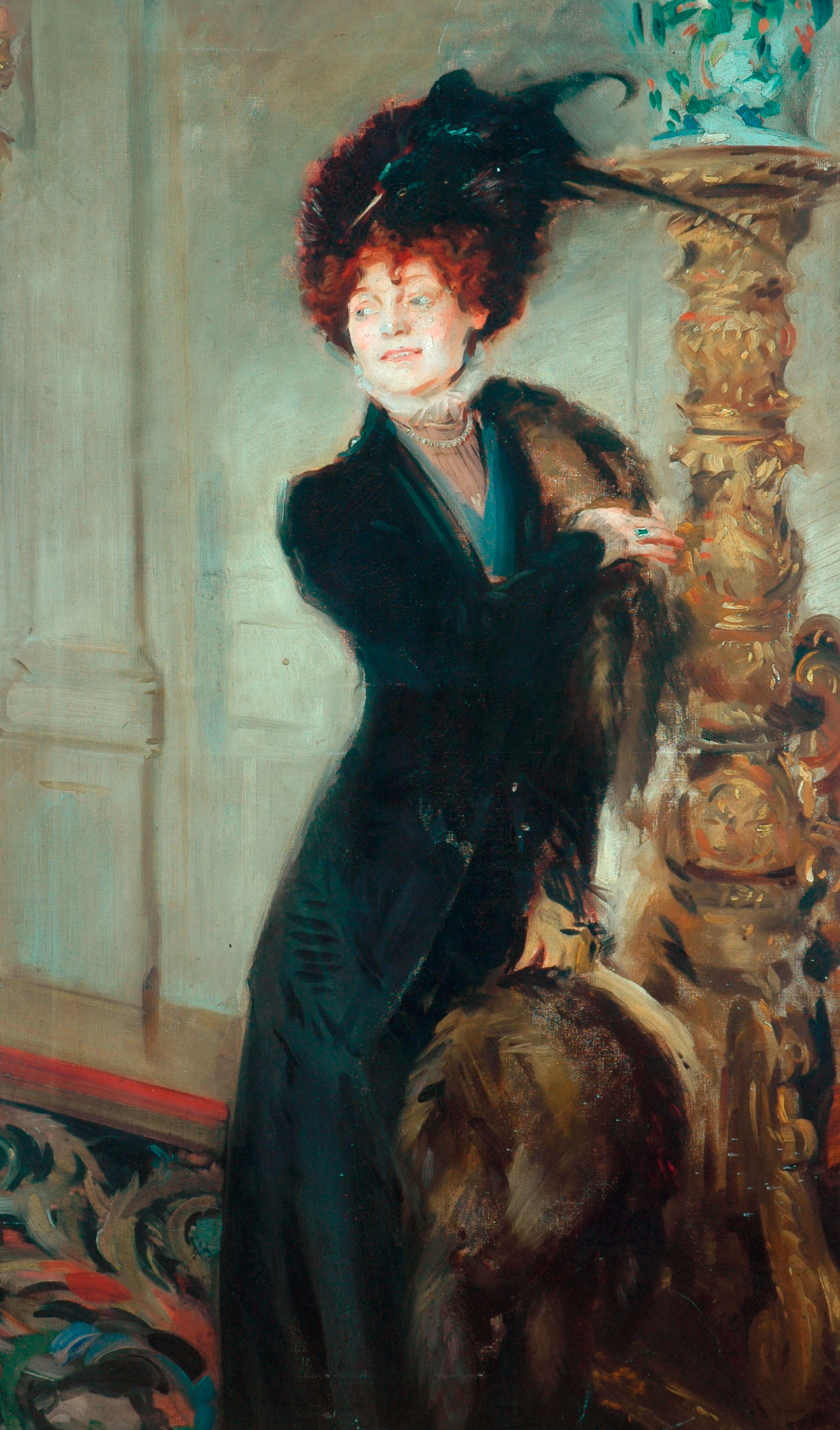
Mrs Emile Mond

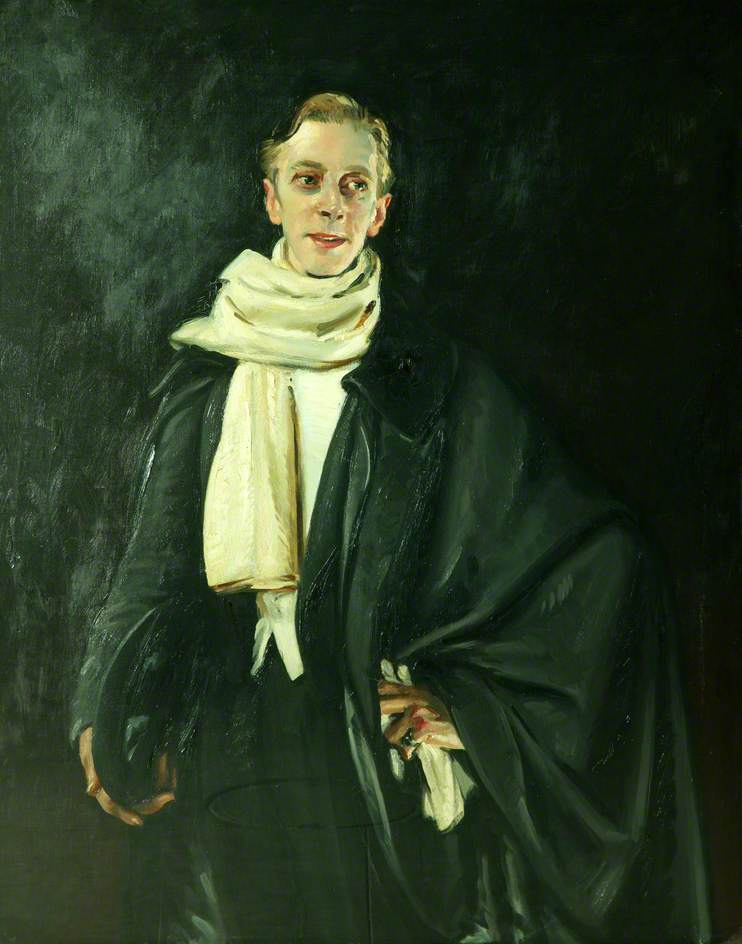
Ernest Thesiger

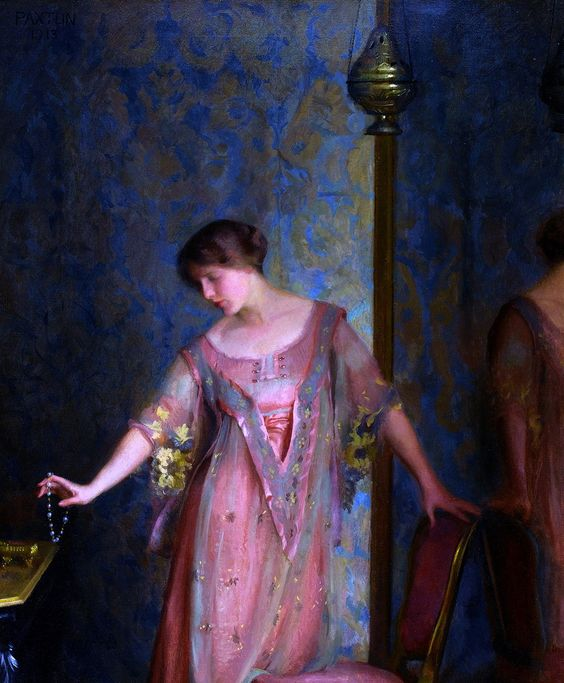
Fashion

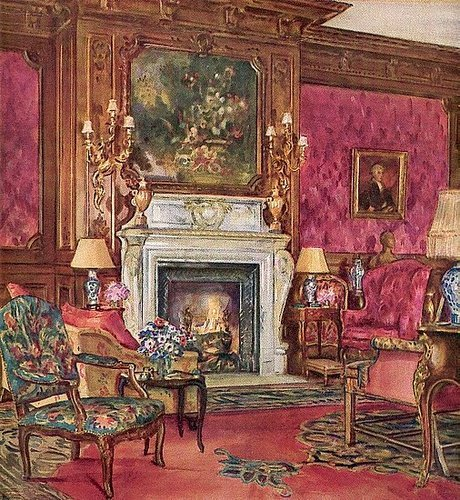
Mrs. Vincent Astor's Drawing Room, Ferncliff, ca. 1931

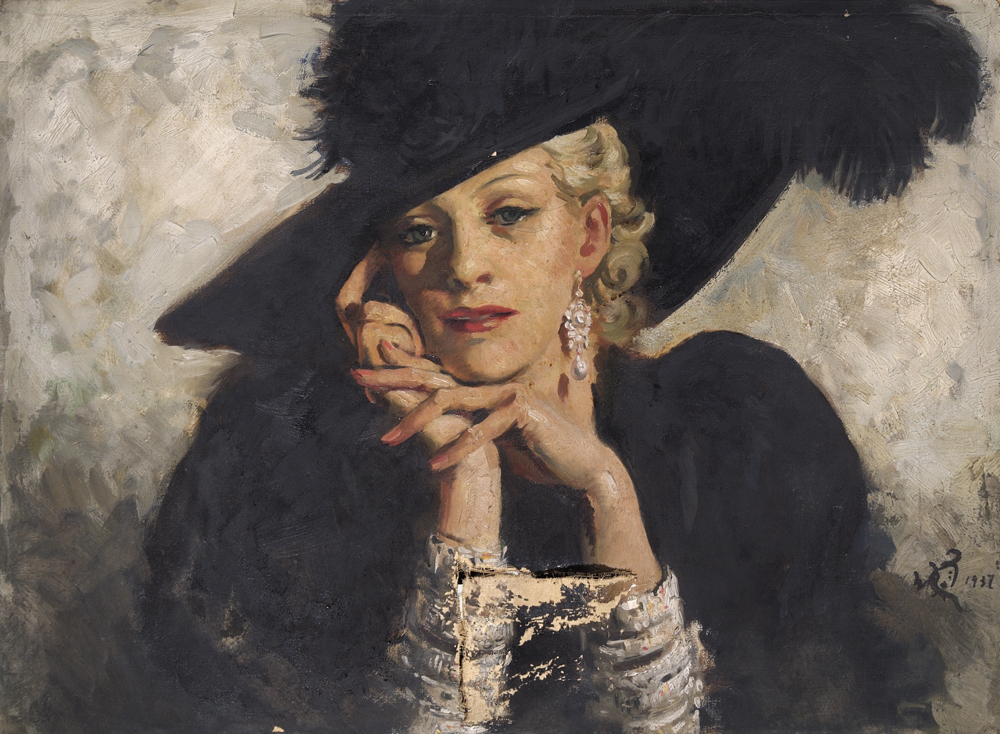
Fine Feathers

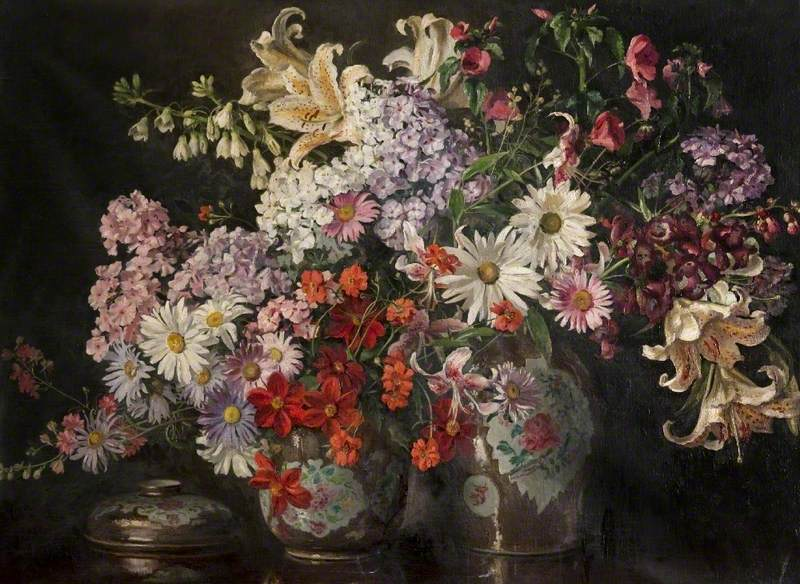
Flower Piece

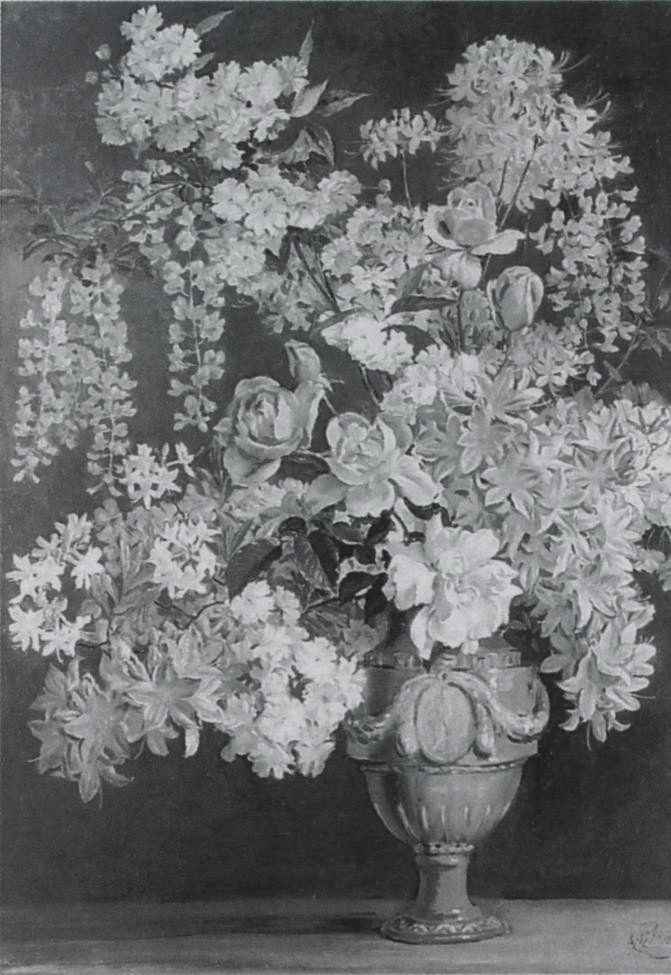
Flower Piece

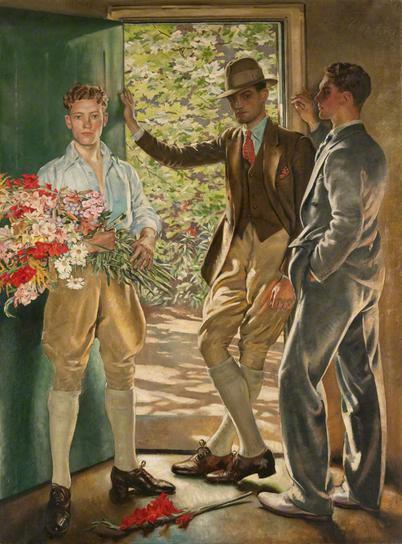
The Garden Door, 1926

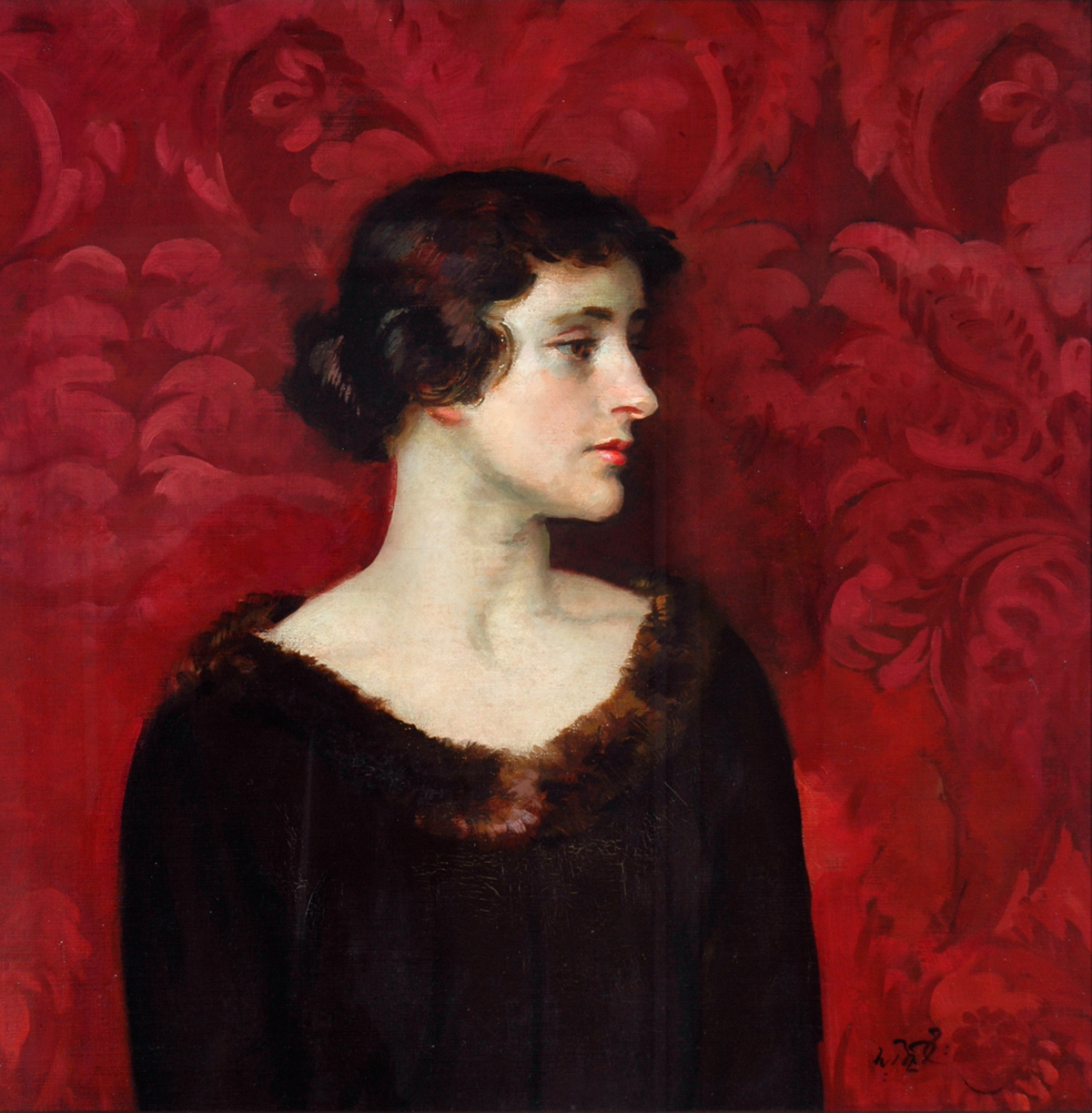
Mrs Gerard Tharp (Dora Maryan Hall) against Red Damask, ca 1920

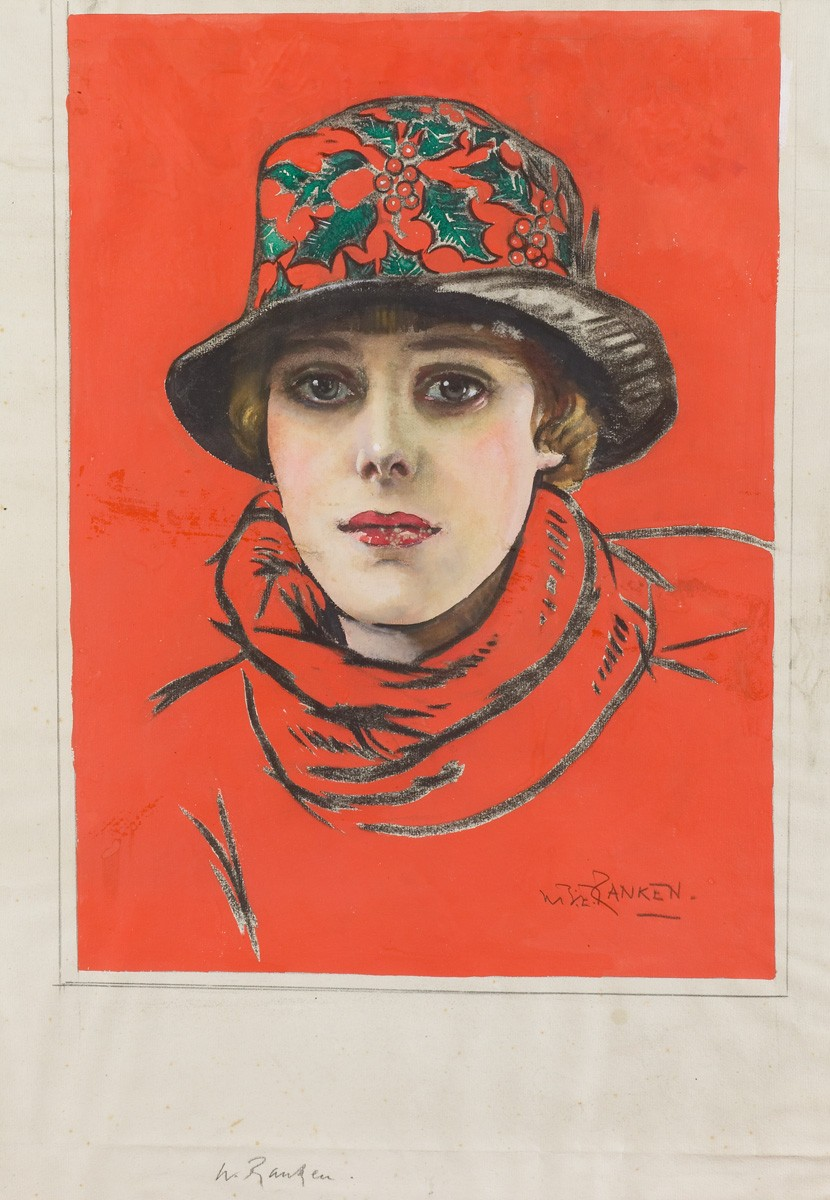
Girl in a Red Hat

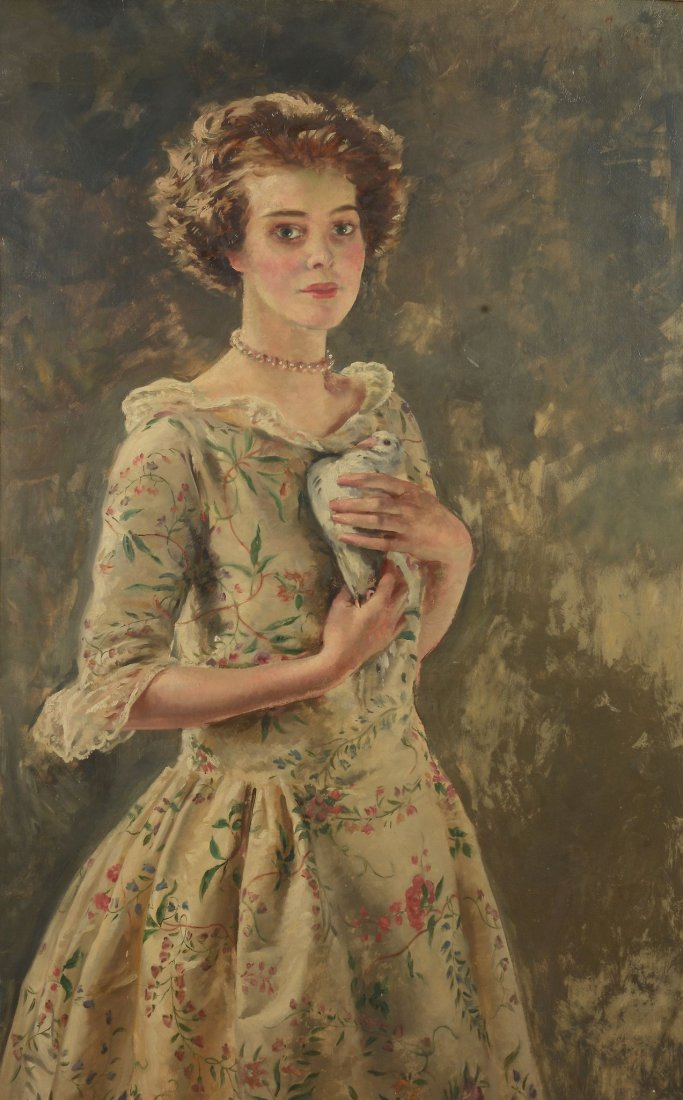
Girl with a Bird, 1924

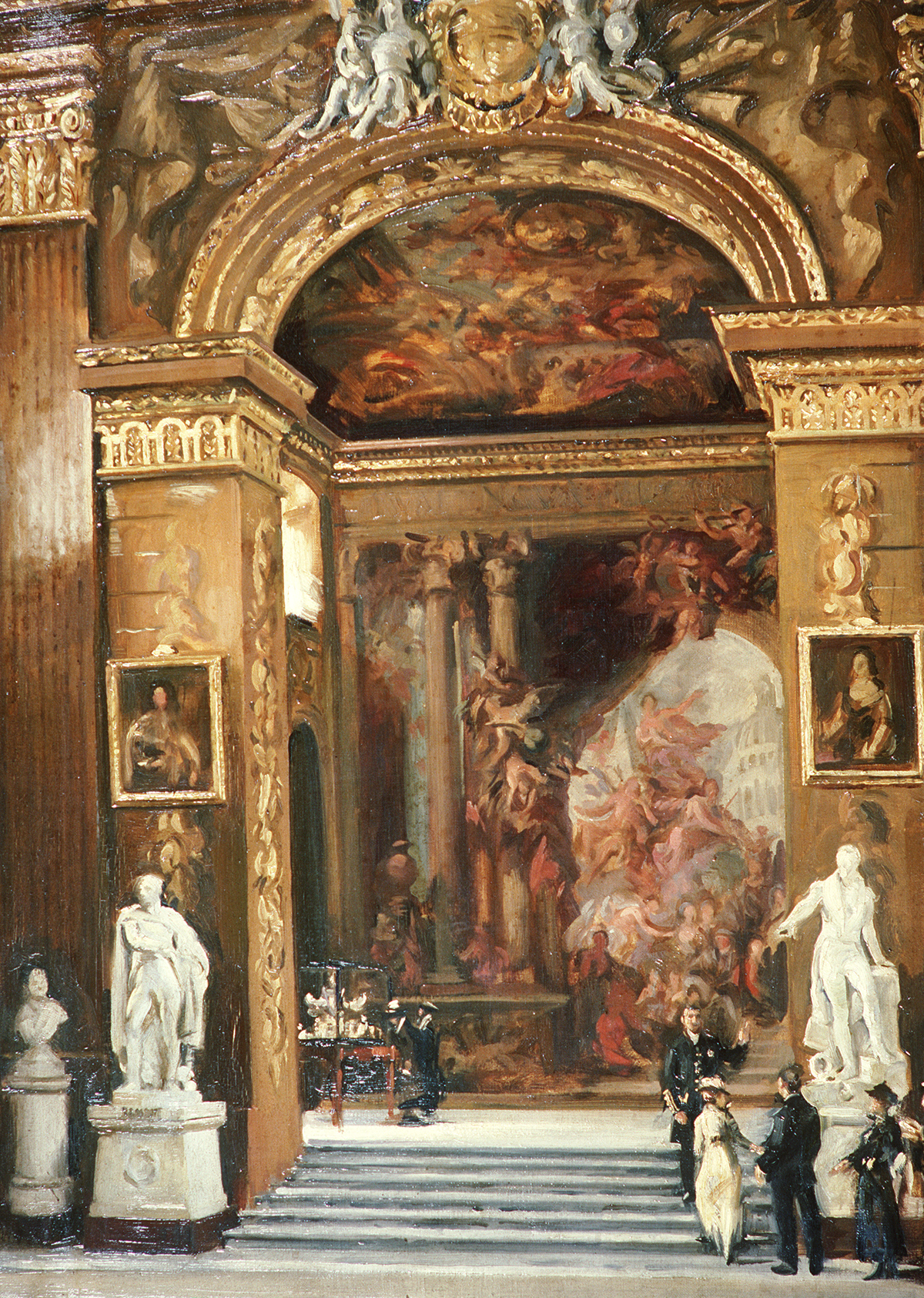
The Interior of the Great Hall, Greenwich, 1919

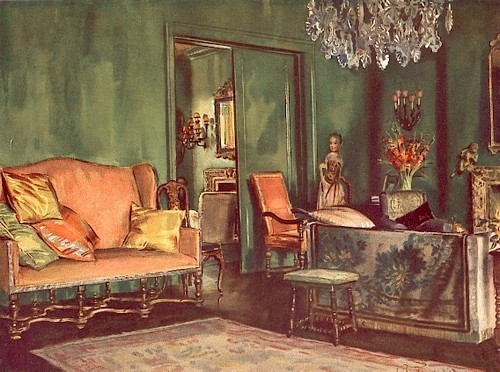
A Green Drawing Room, Hon. Mrs Guy Bethel's House, Colour and Interior Decoration, Country Life, 1926

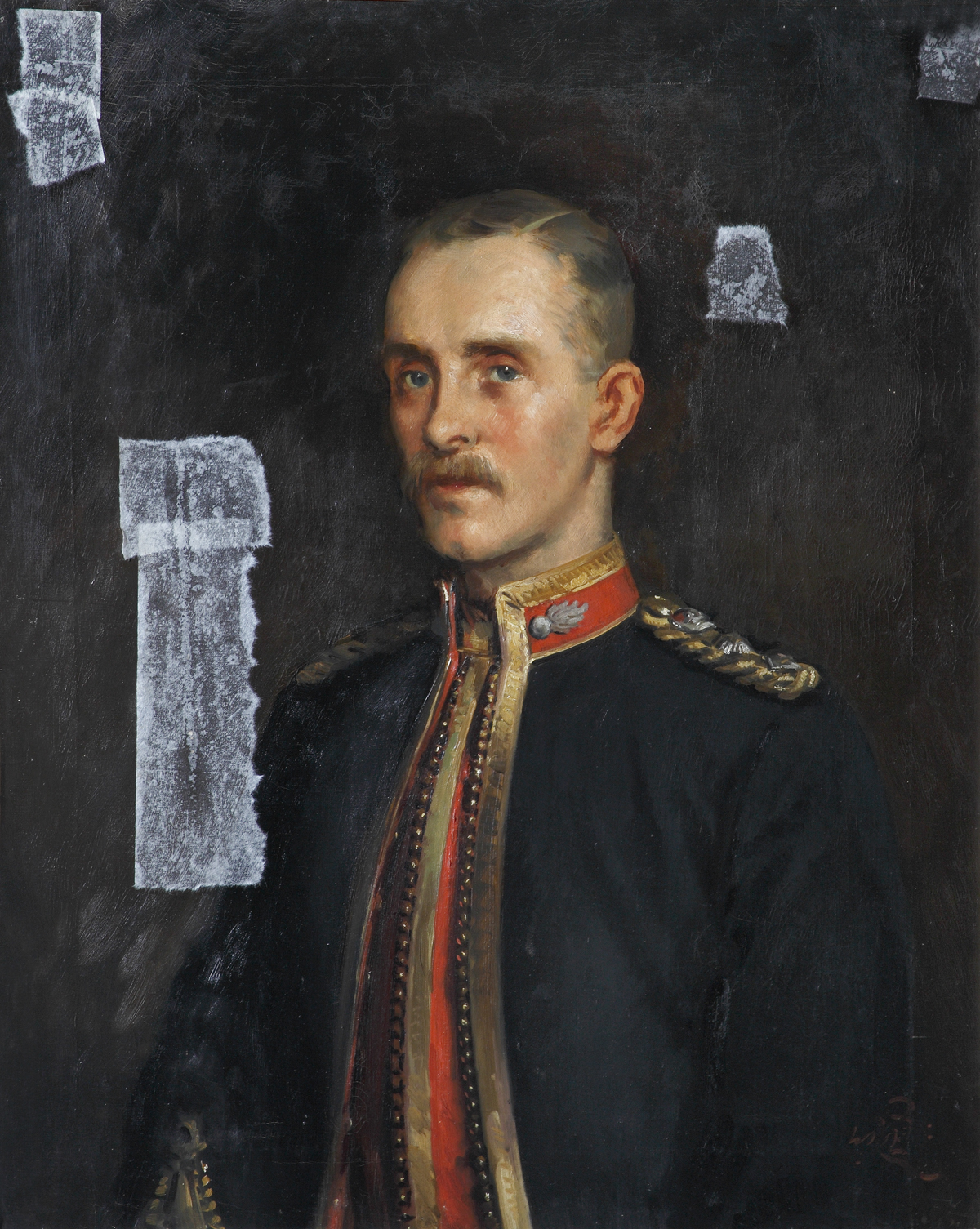
Lieutenant-Colonel (later Colonel) Henry Cleland Dunlop, Royal Artillery, 1900

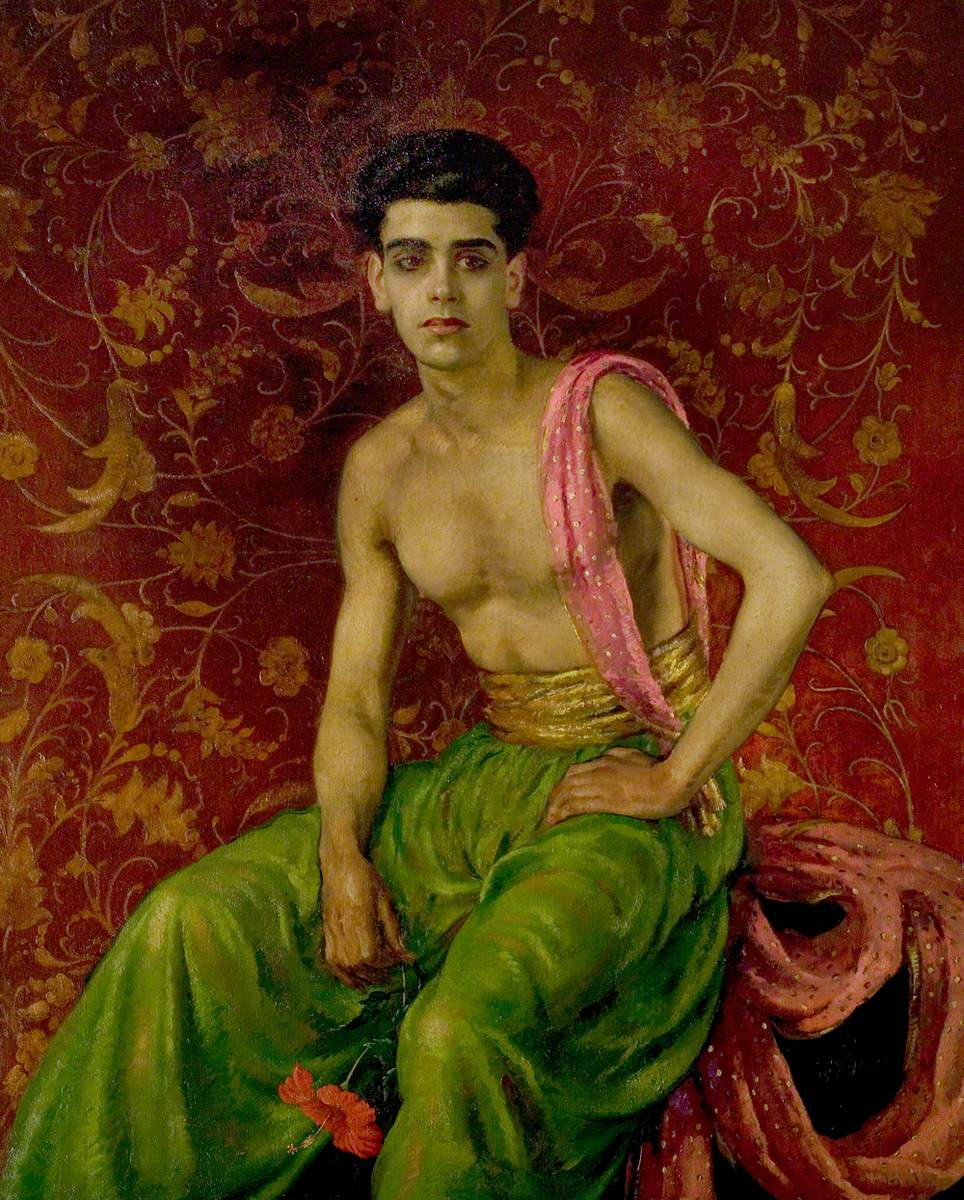
Hibiscus Flower, 1922

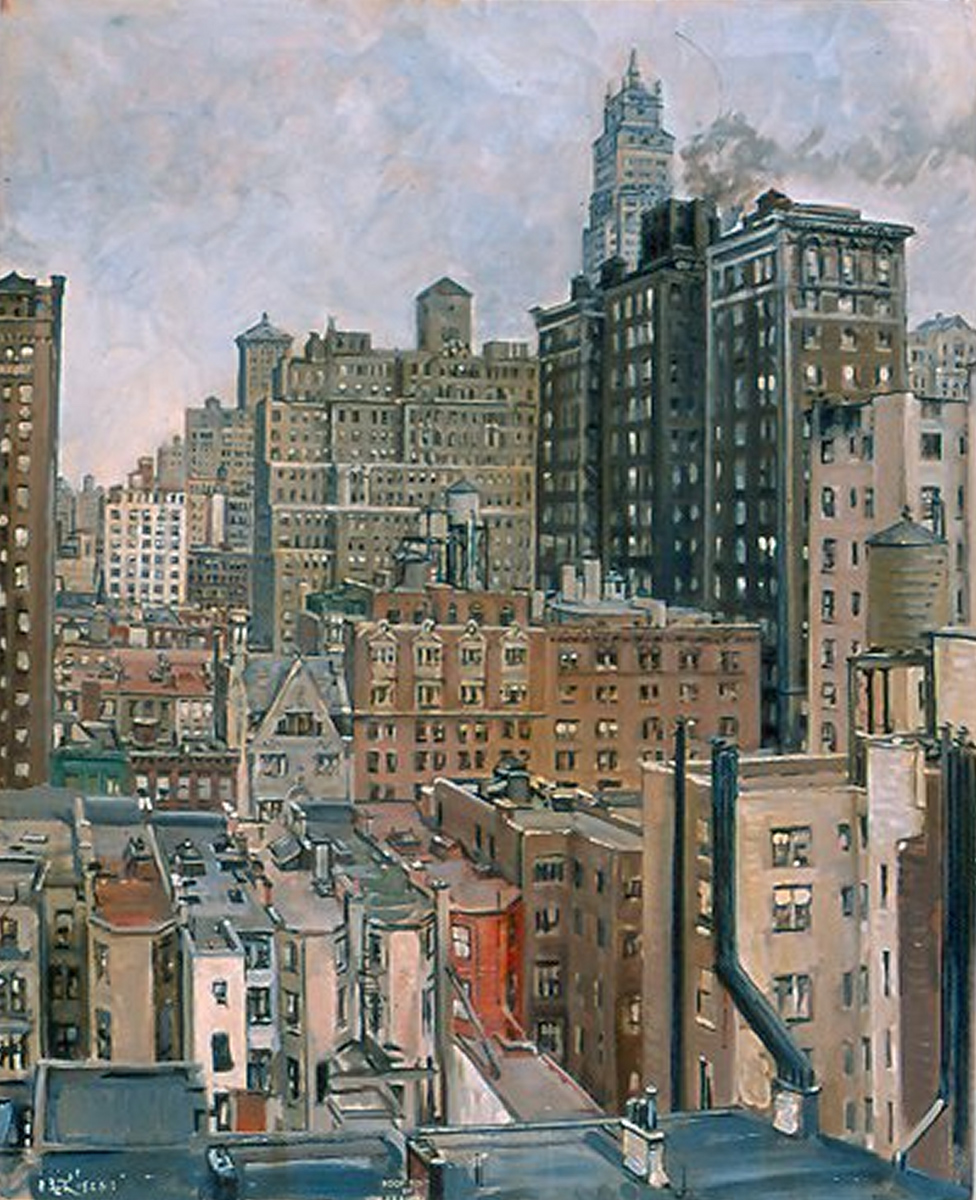
Higher, Higher and Higher, 1928

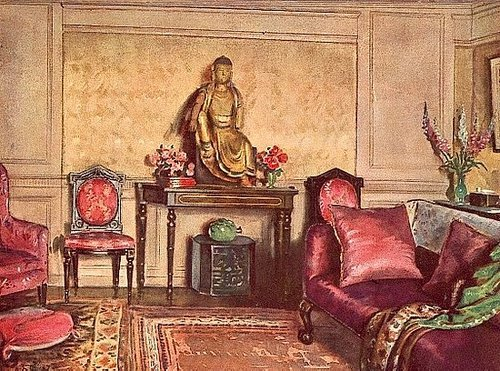
A Pink Drawing-Room, Howbridge Hall, Witham, Colour and Interior Decoration, Country Life, 1926

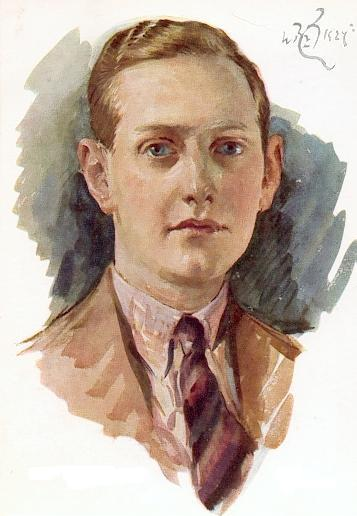
Hugh Lygon, 1927

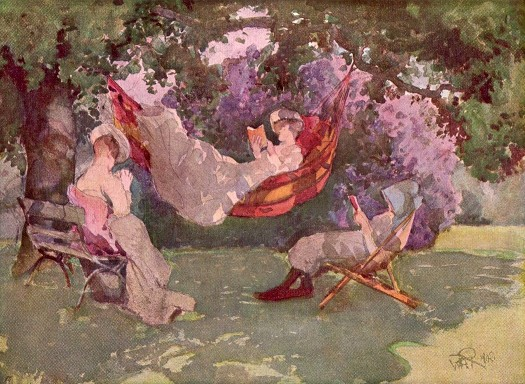
In the Garden, 1902

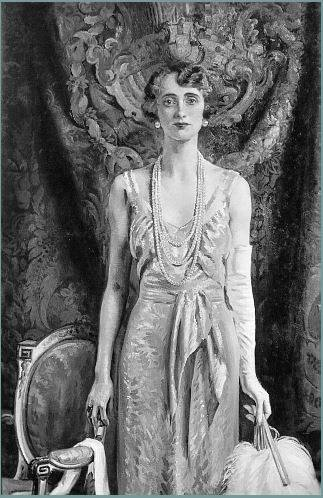
Irene Mountbatten, Marchioness of Carisbrooke, ca 1930

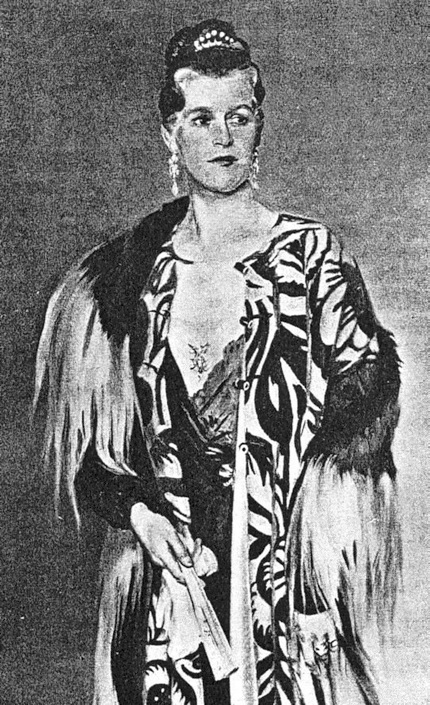
Janette Ranken Thesiger, 1917

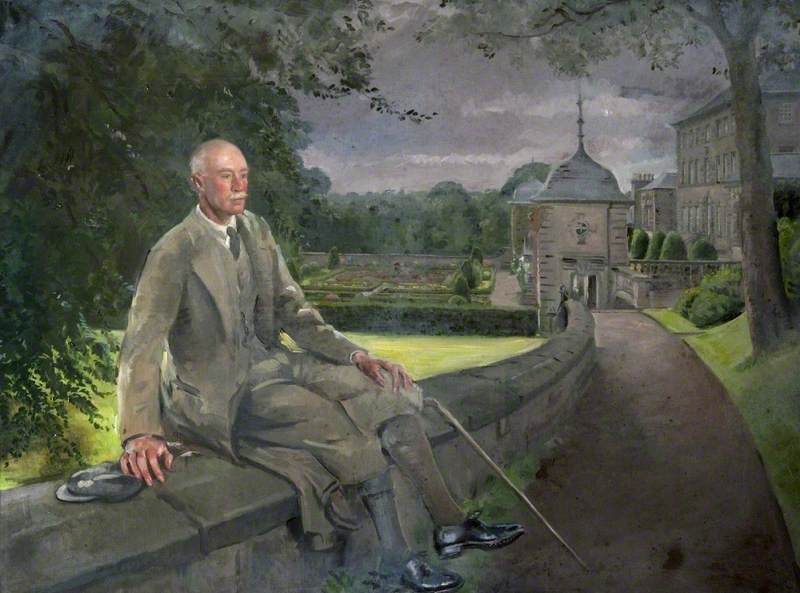
Sir John Stirling-Maxwell, 10th Baronet, 1922

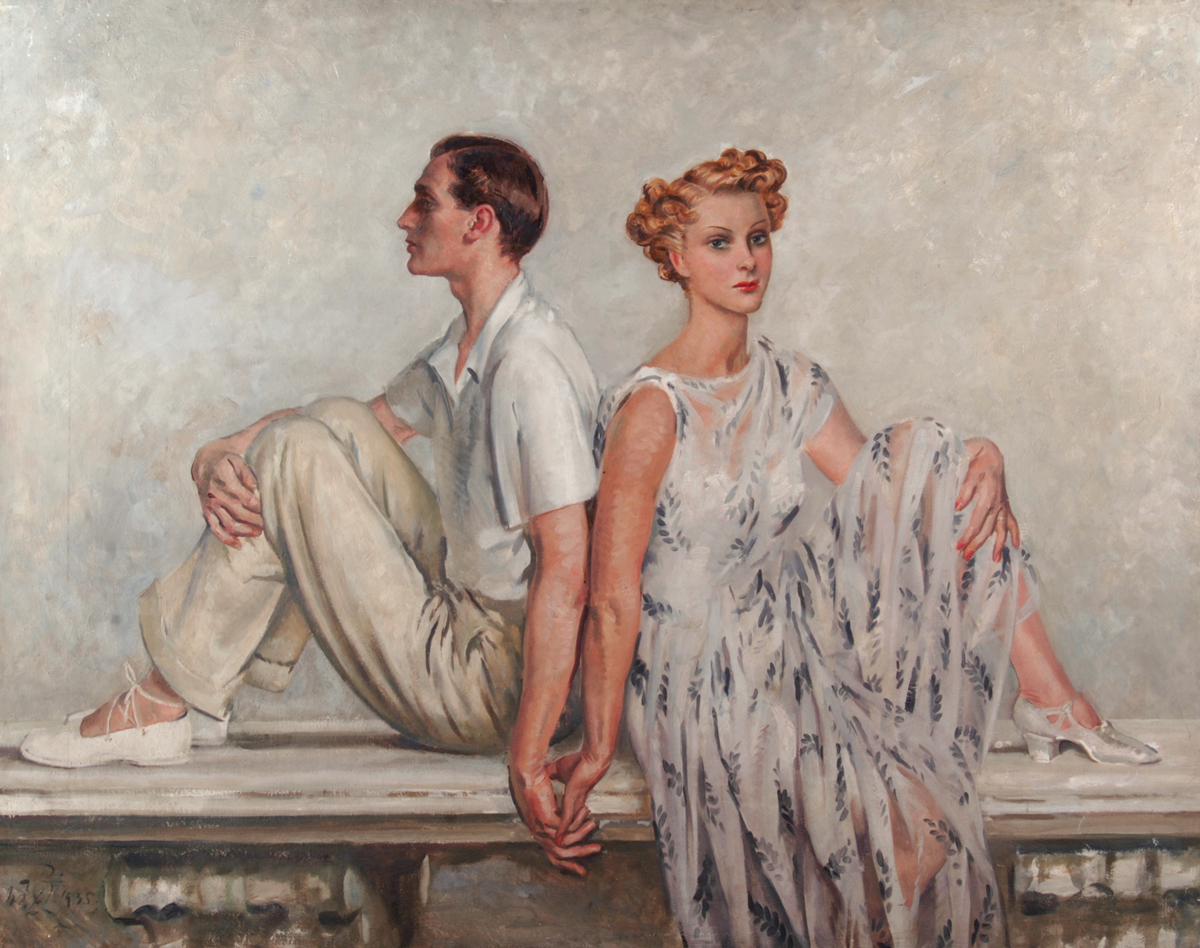
Mr and Mrs John V. Templeton, 1935

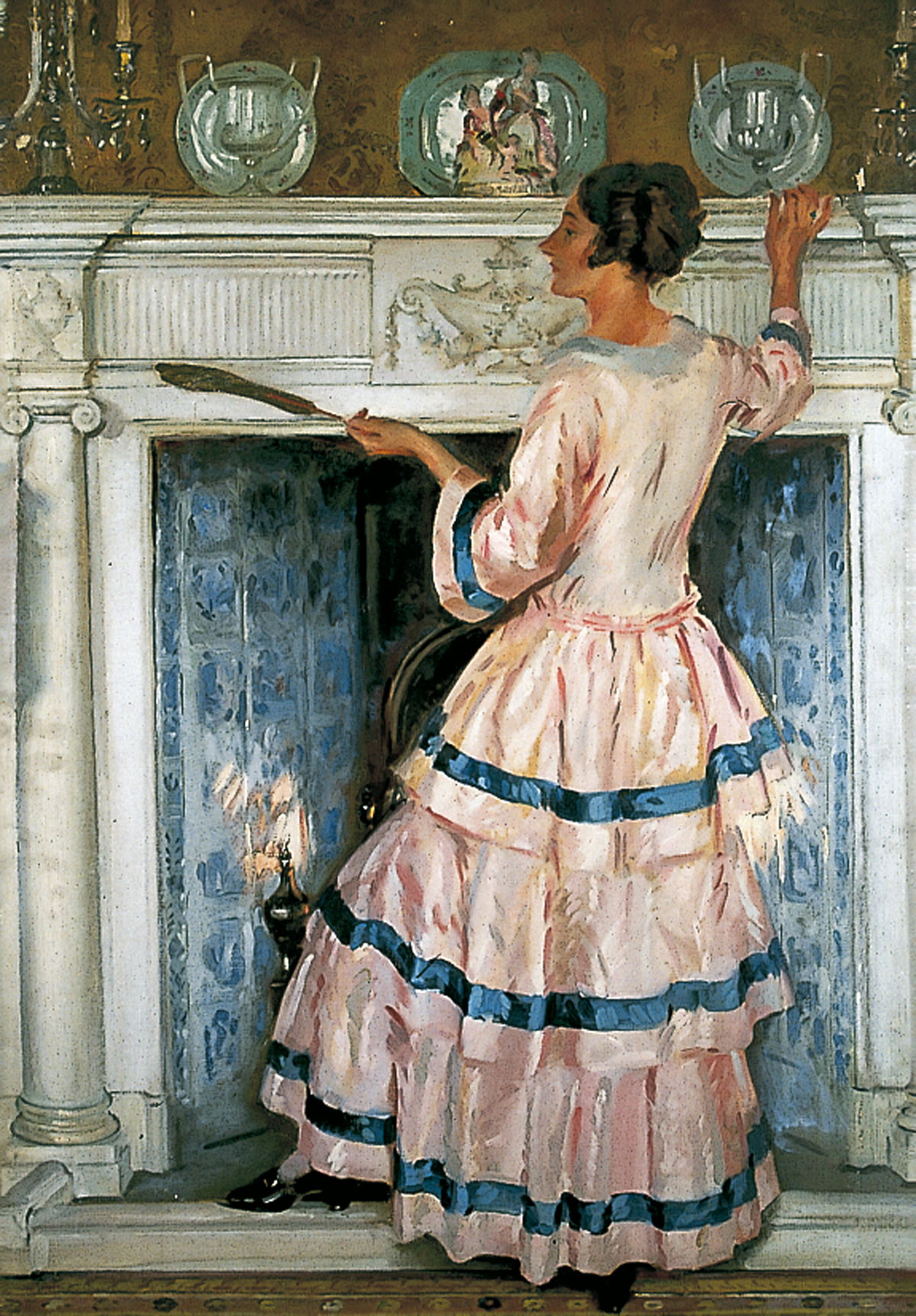
Mrs Kelsey (Alice Geer Kelsey) in Pink, 1919

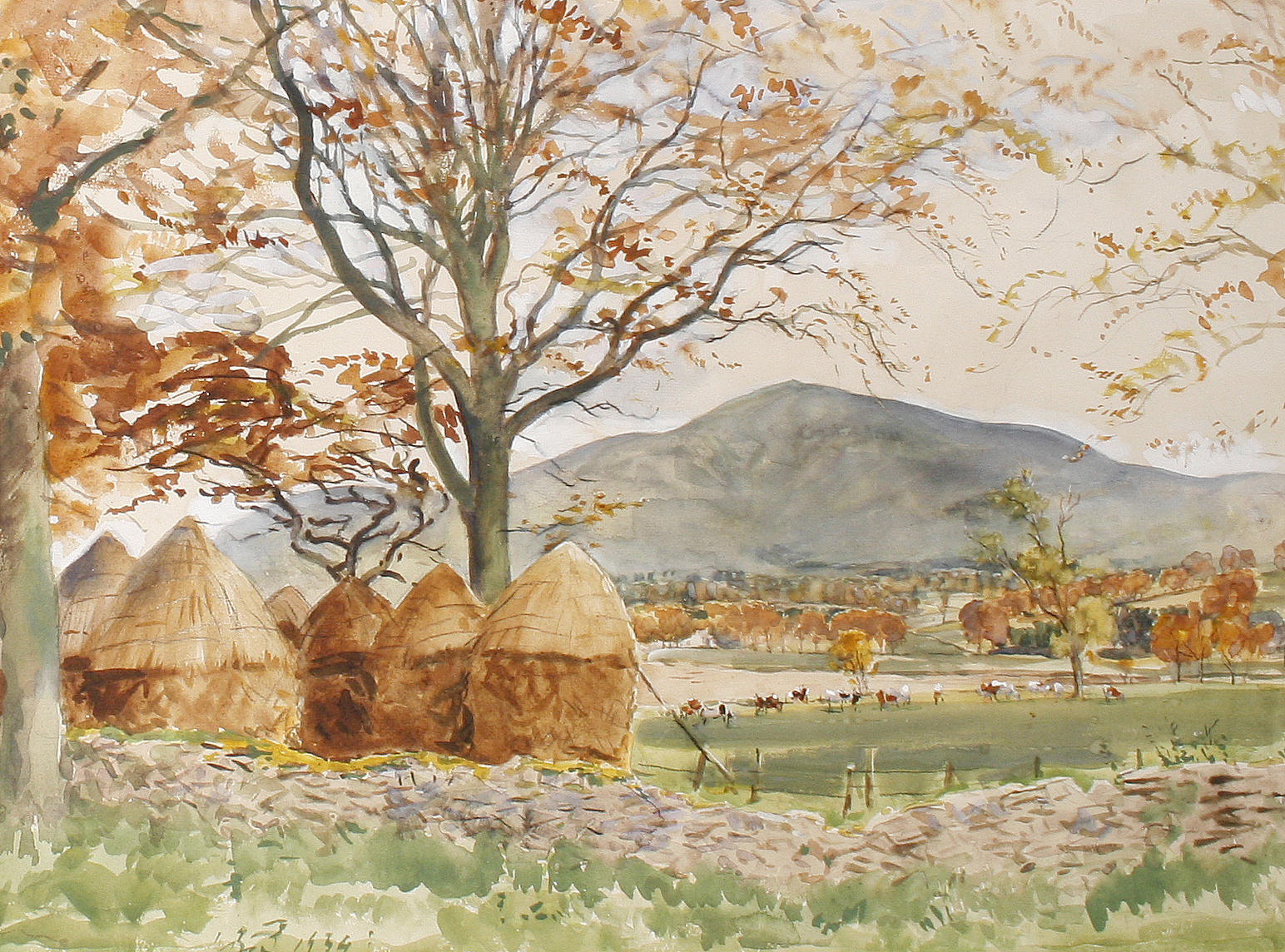
Landscape with haystacks, 1934

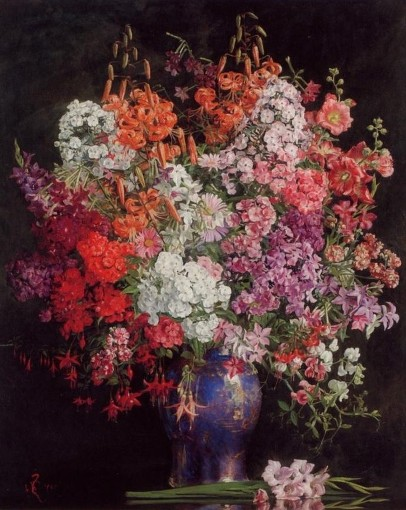
Late Summer, 1940

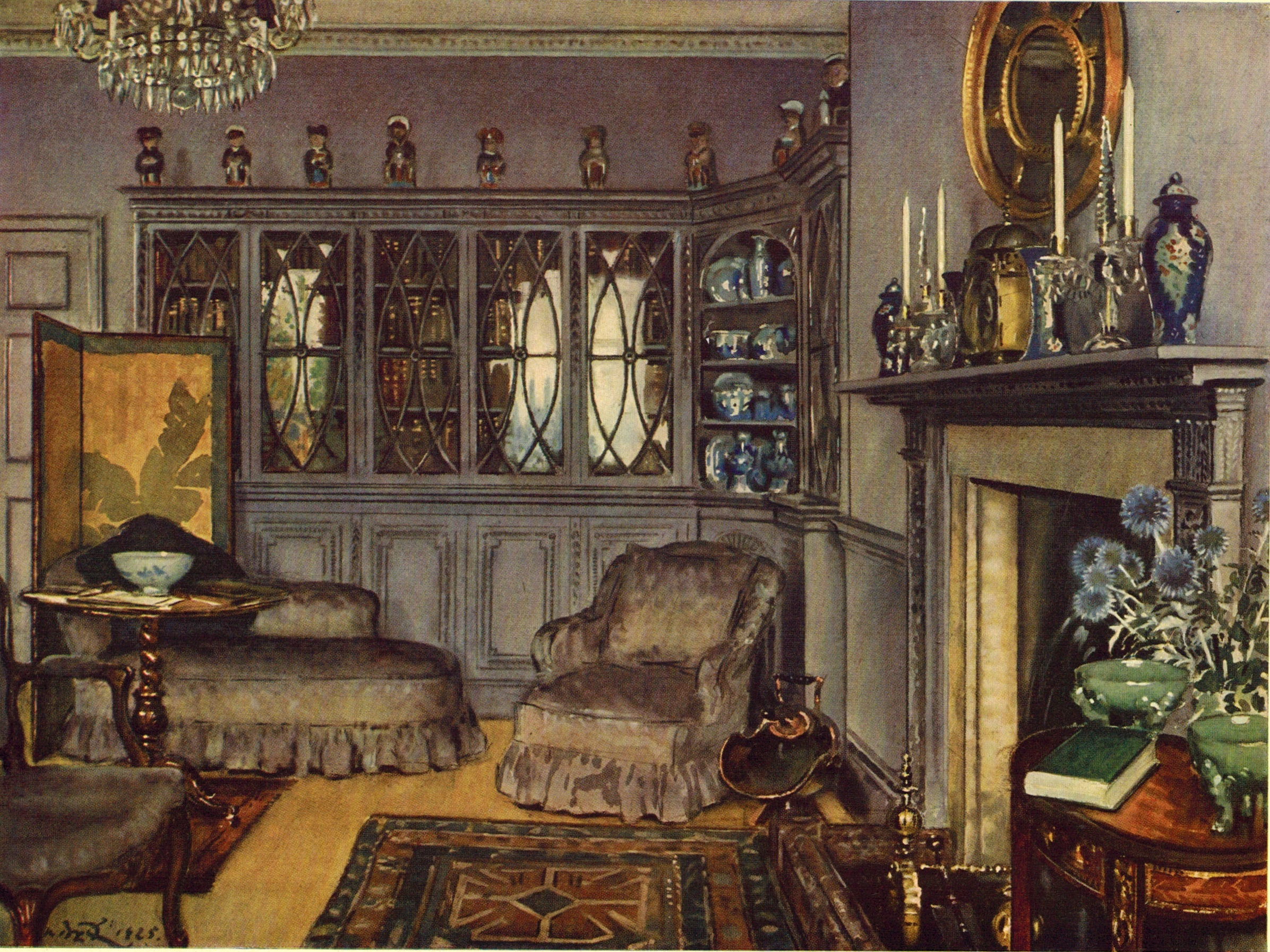
A Grey Room, Hon. Lionel Holland's House, Colour and Interior Decoration, Country Life, 1926

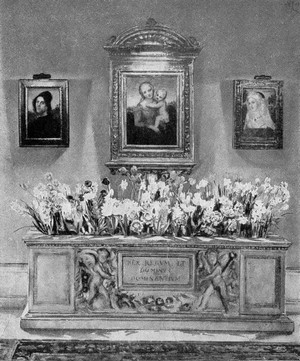
The Raphael Room, Lynnewood Hall, 1917

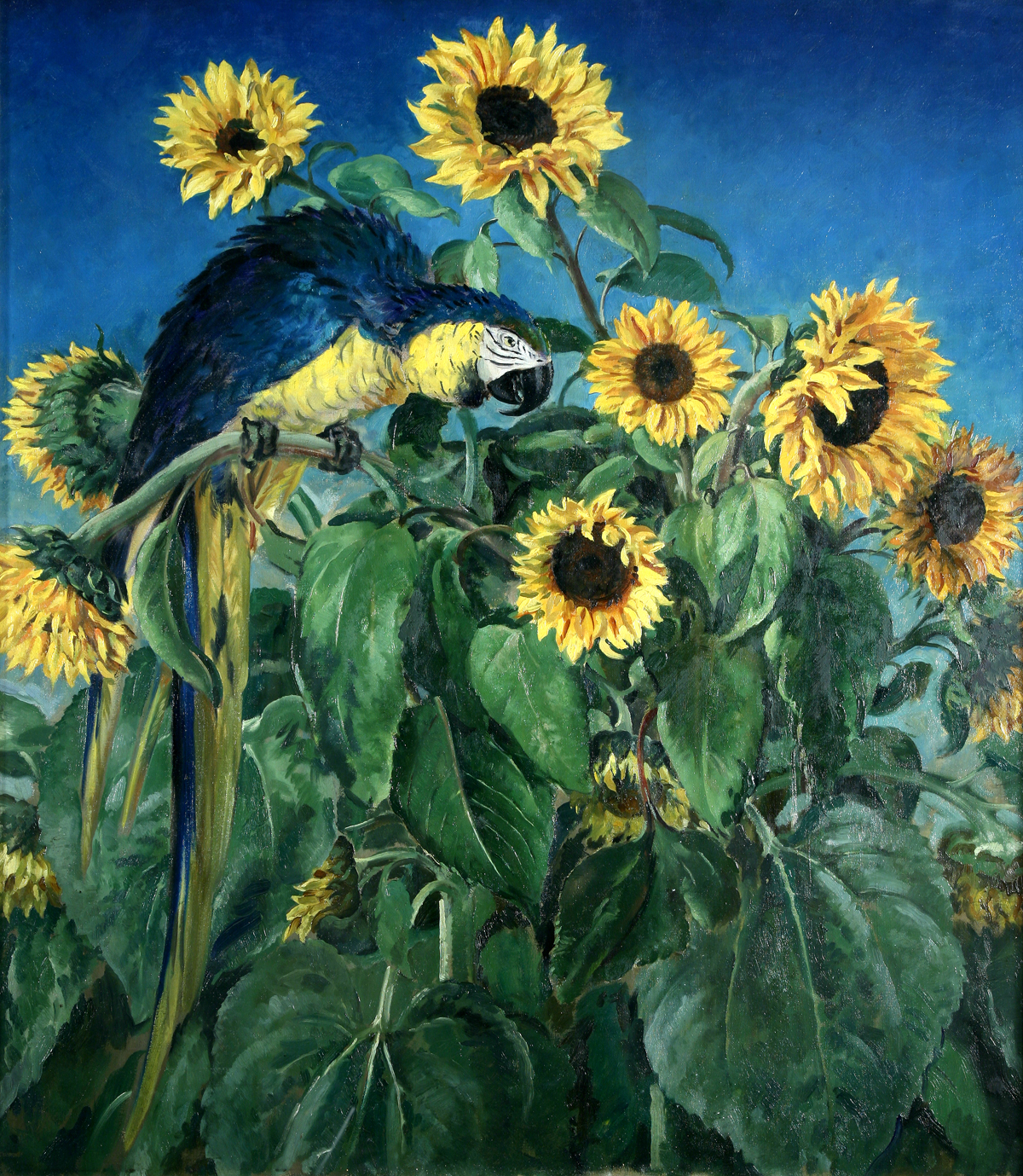
Macaw and Sunflowers

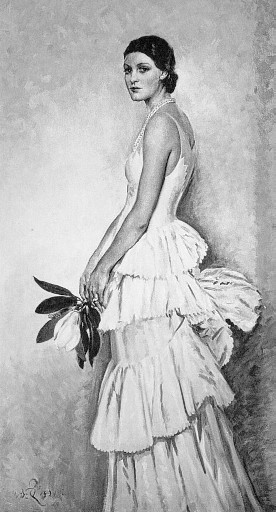
Magnolia, 1931

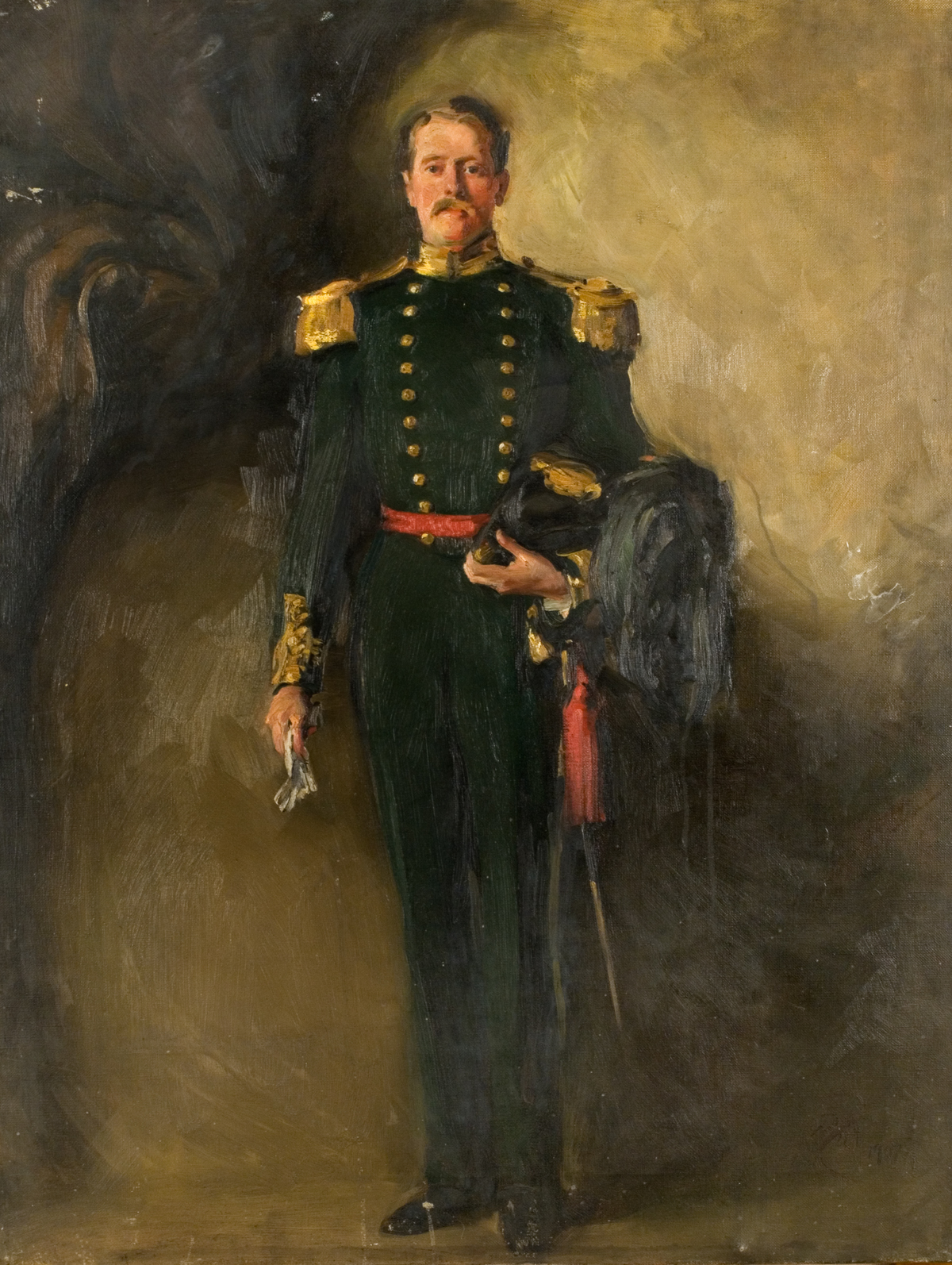
A Man in the Green Uniform of the Scottish Archers

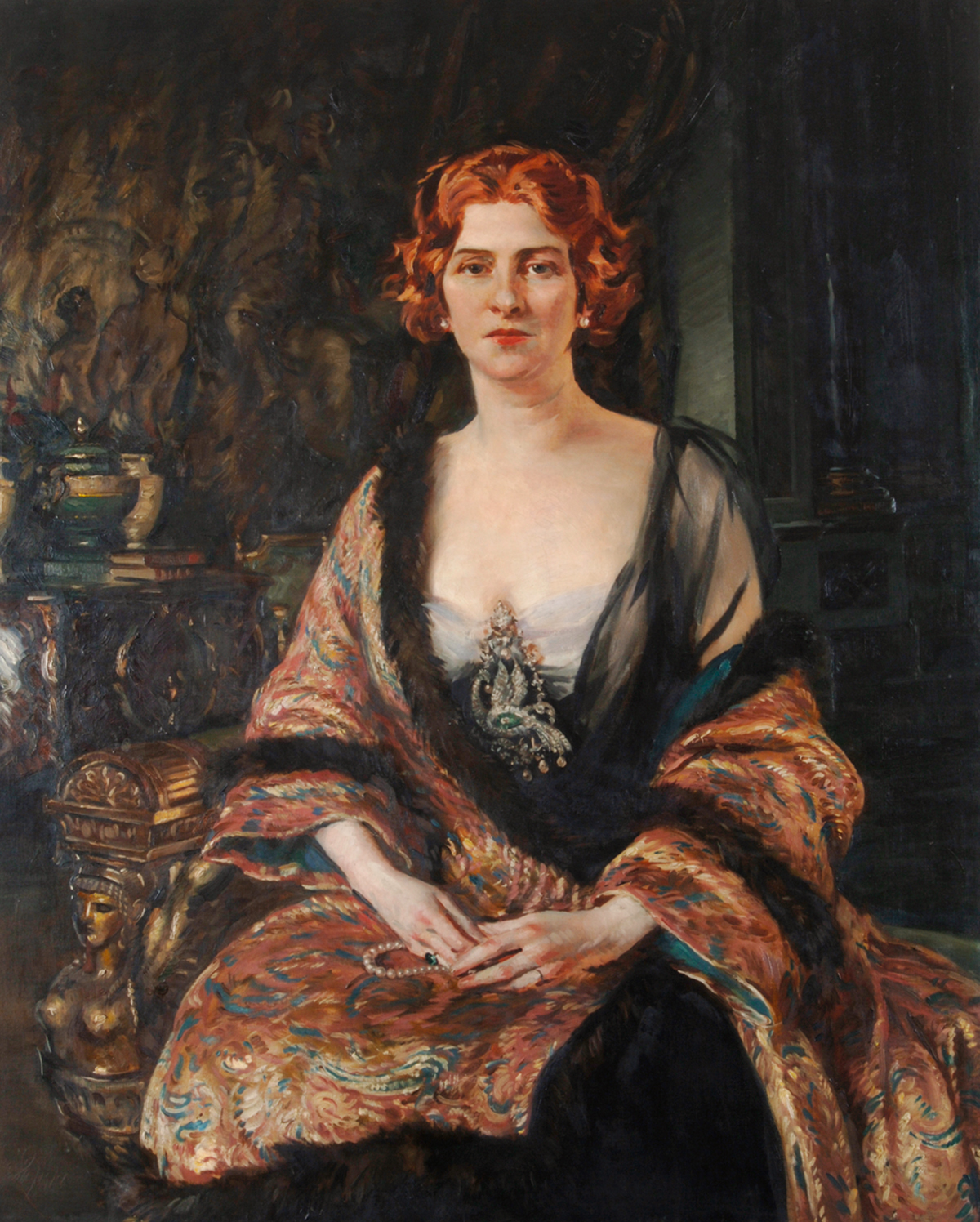
Catherine, Baroness d'Erlanger, 1918

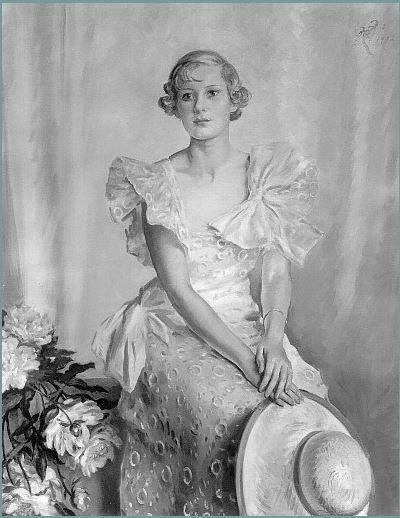
Miss Marina Koshetz, 1932

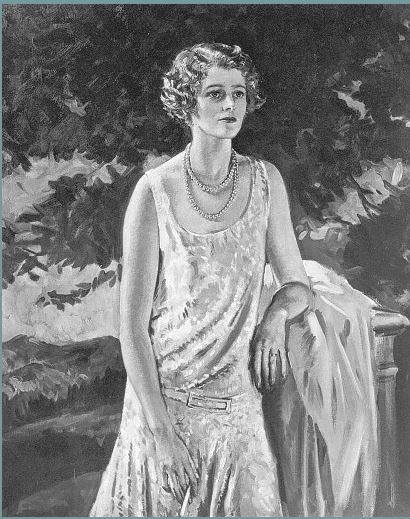
Marjorie Pratt, Countess of Brecknock, ca 1929

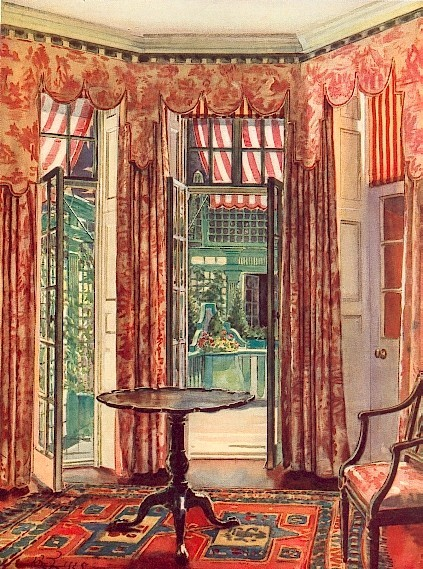
A Red Room, Martin de Selincourt (Aubrey de Sélincourt's father)'s House, Colour and Interior Decoration, Country Life, 1926

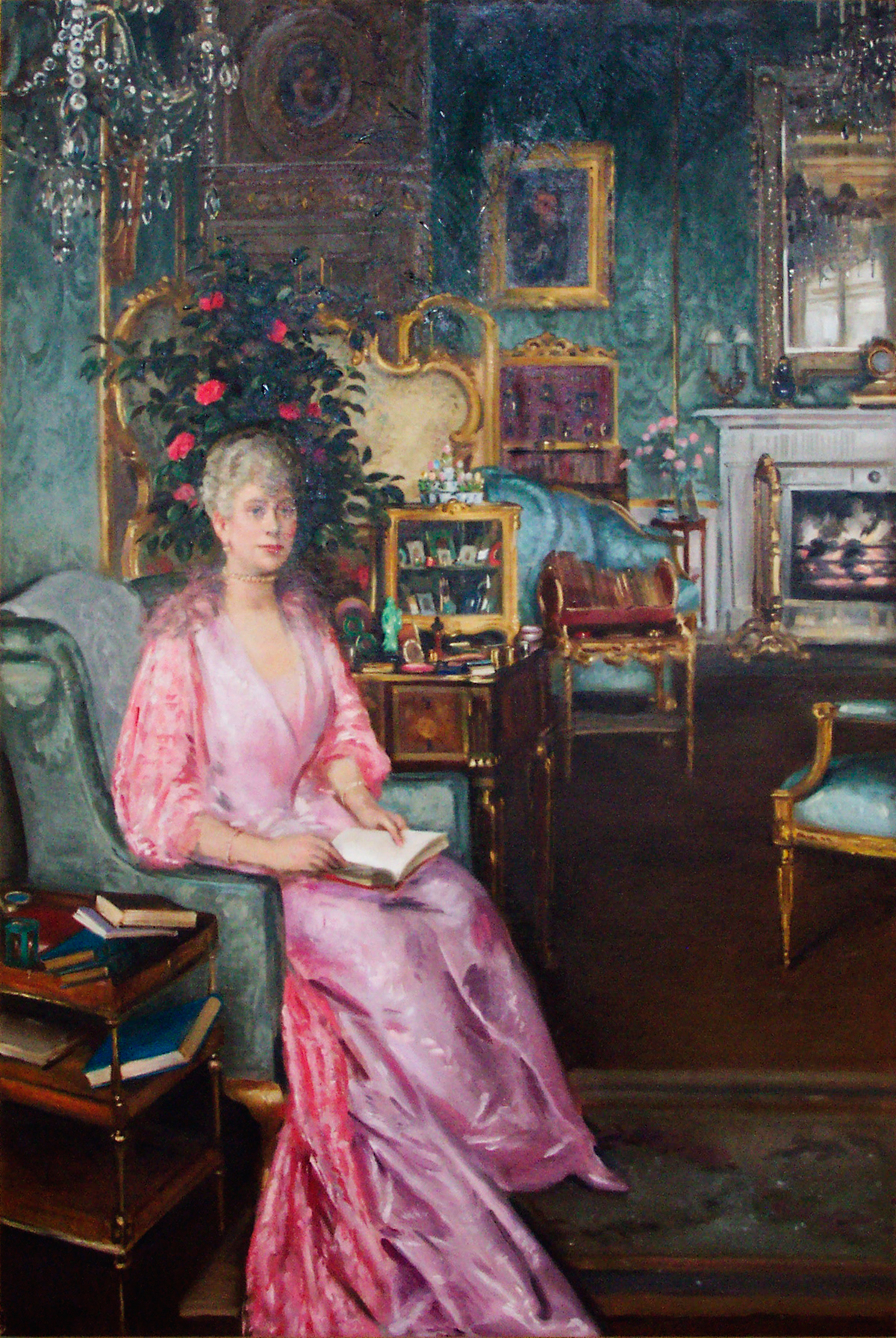
Mary of Teck, Queen Consort of King George V, 1923

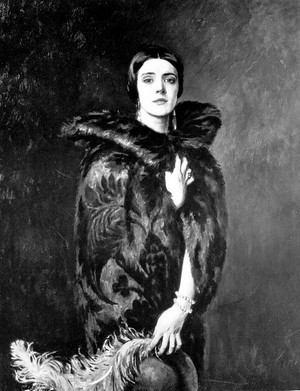
Mary Irene Curzon, 2nd Baroness Ravensdale, 1925

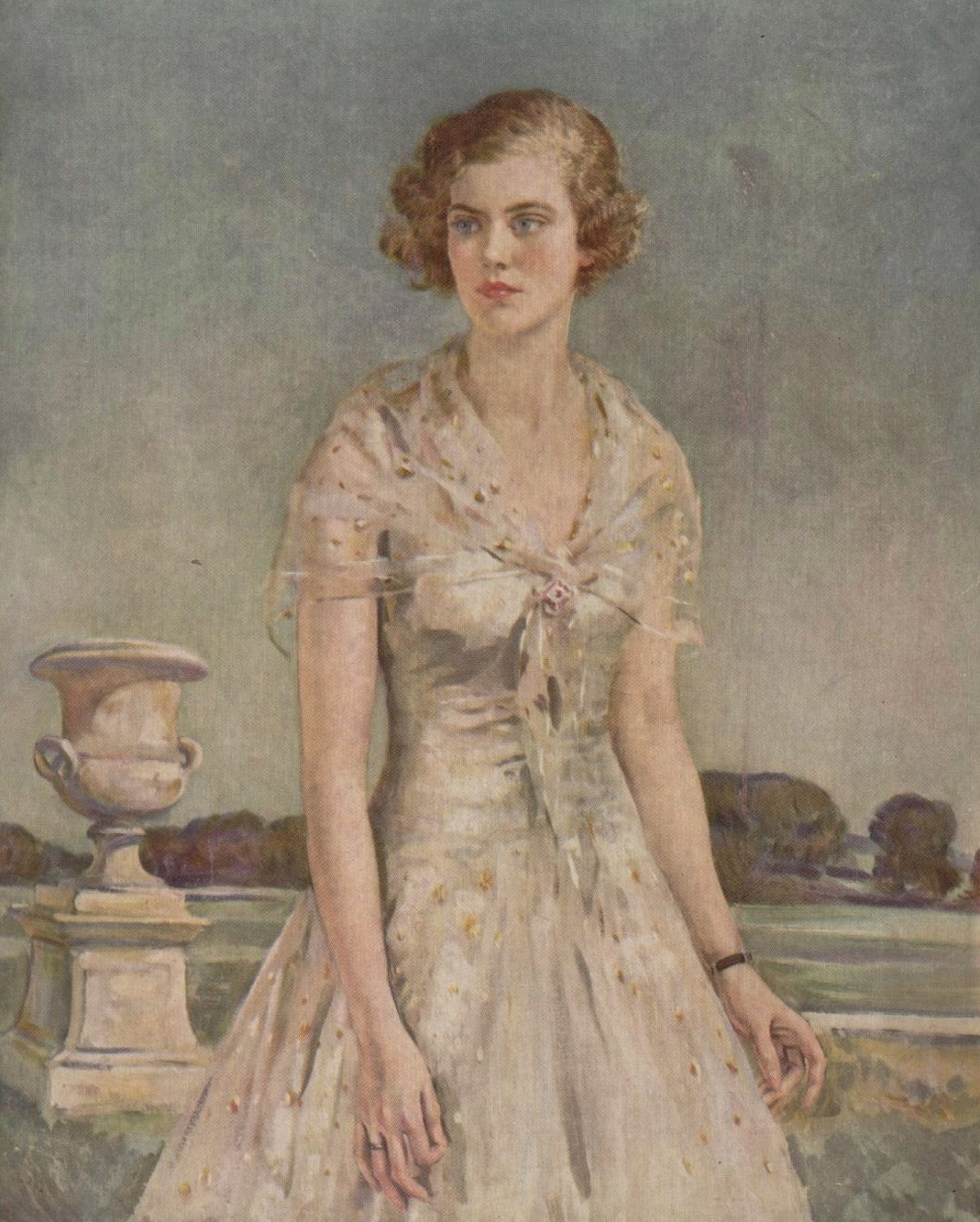
Lady Mary Lygon, 1928

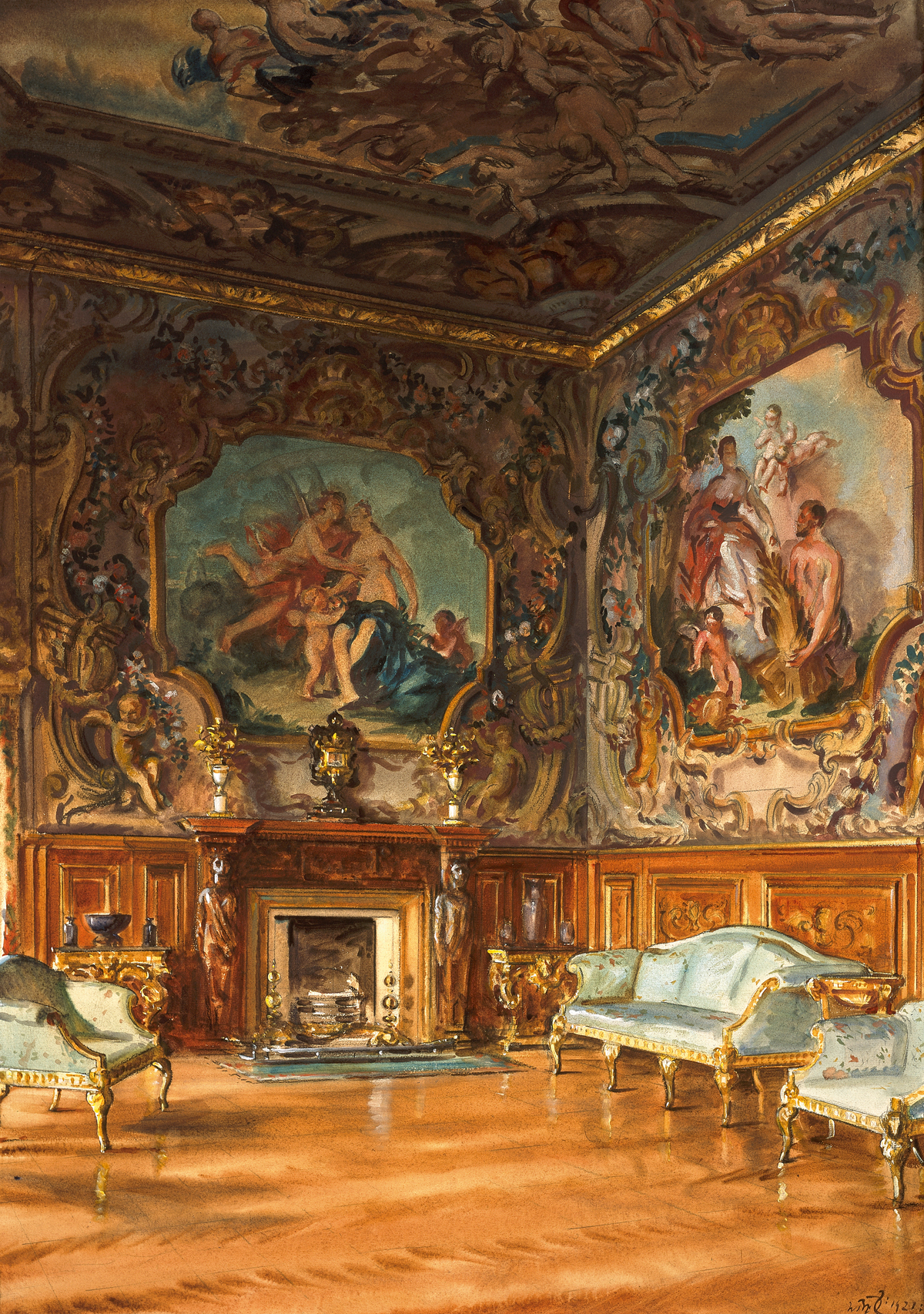
The Saloon, Moor Park, Hertfordshire

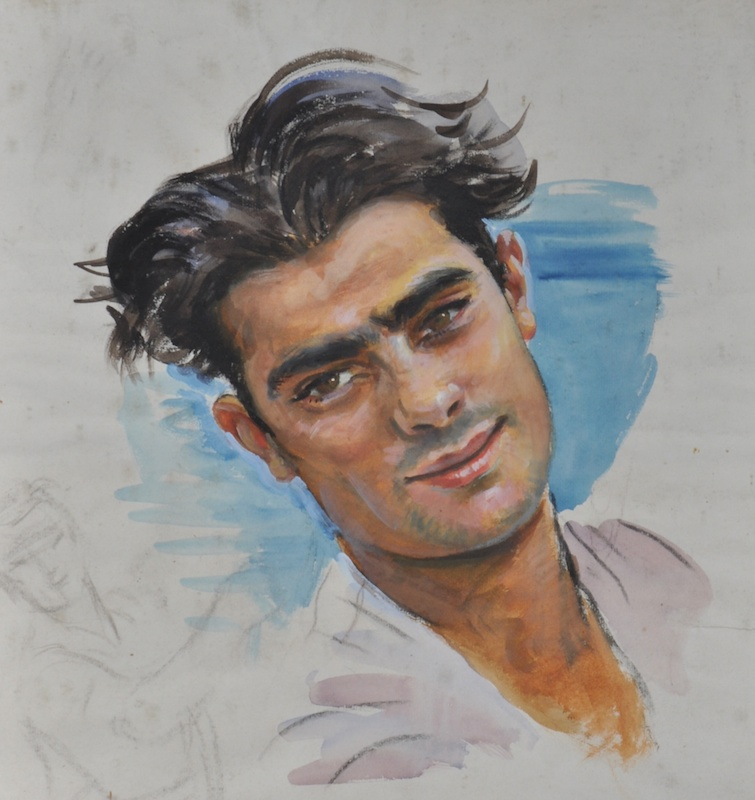
Napolitain Man, 1930s

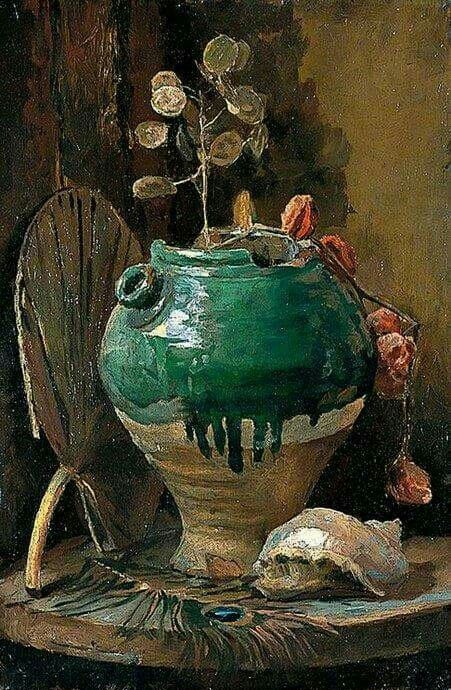
Nature Morte (with Green Vase), 1897

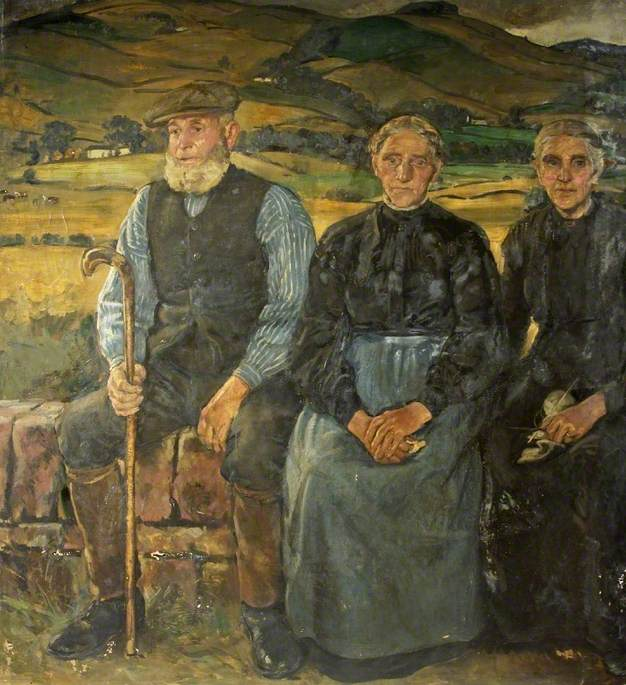
Old Maclachtie, Mary Hamilton and Mrs Tait, 1919

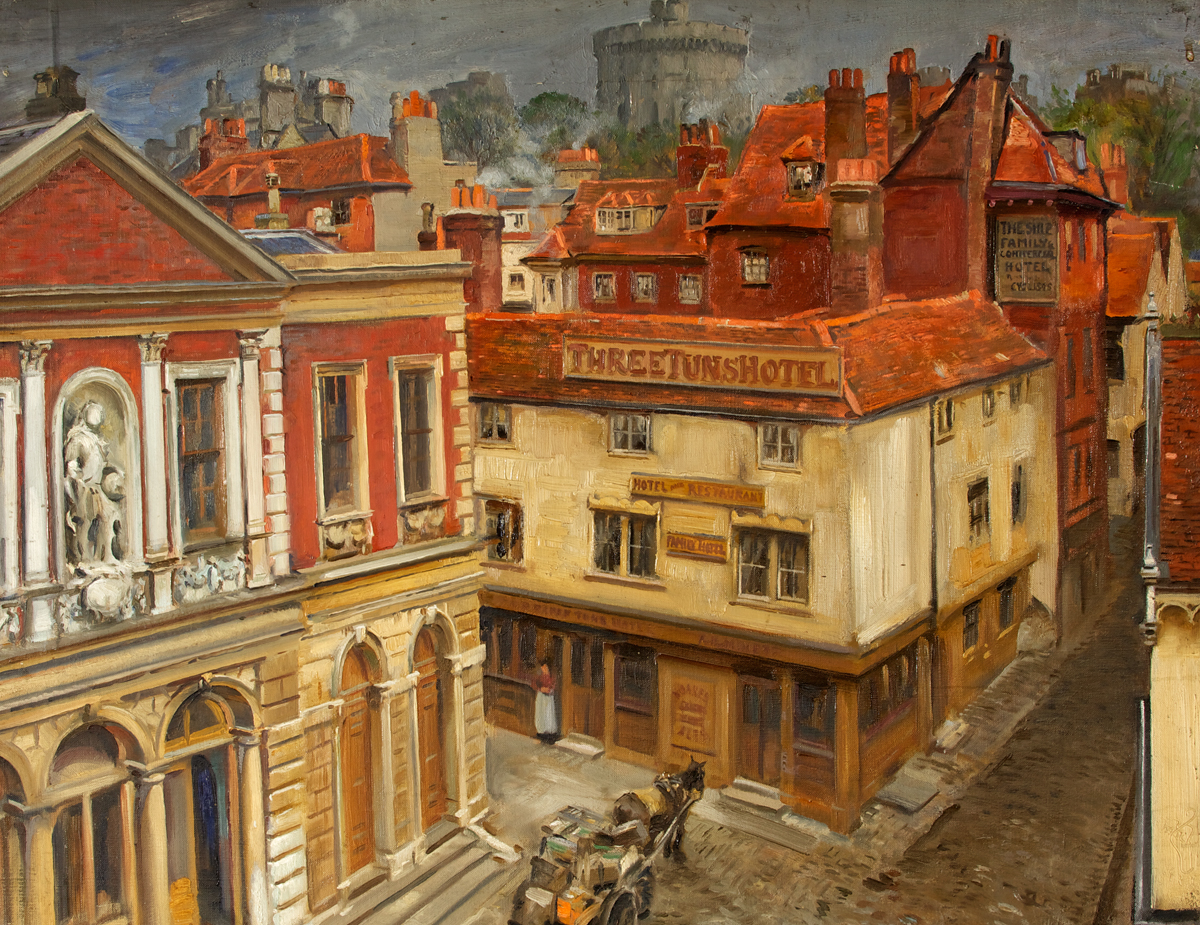
Old Town Hall, Windsor

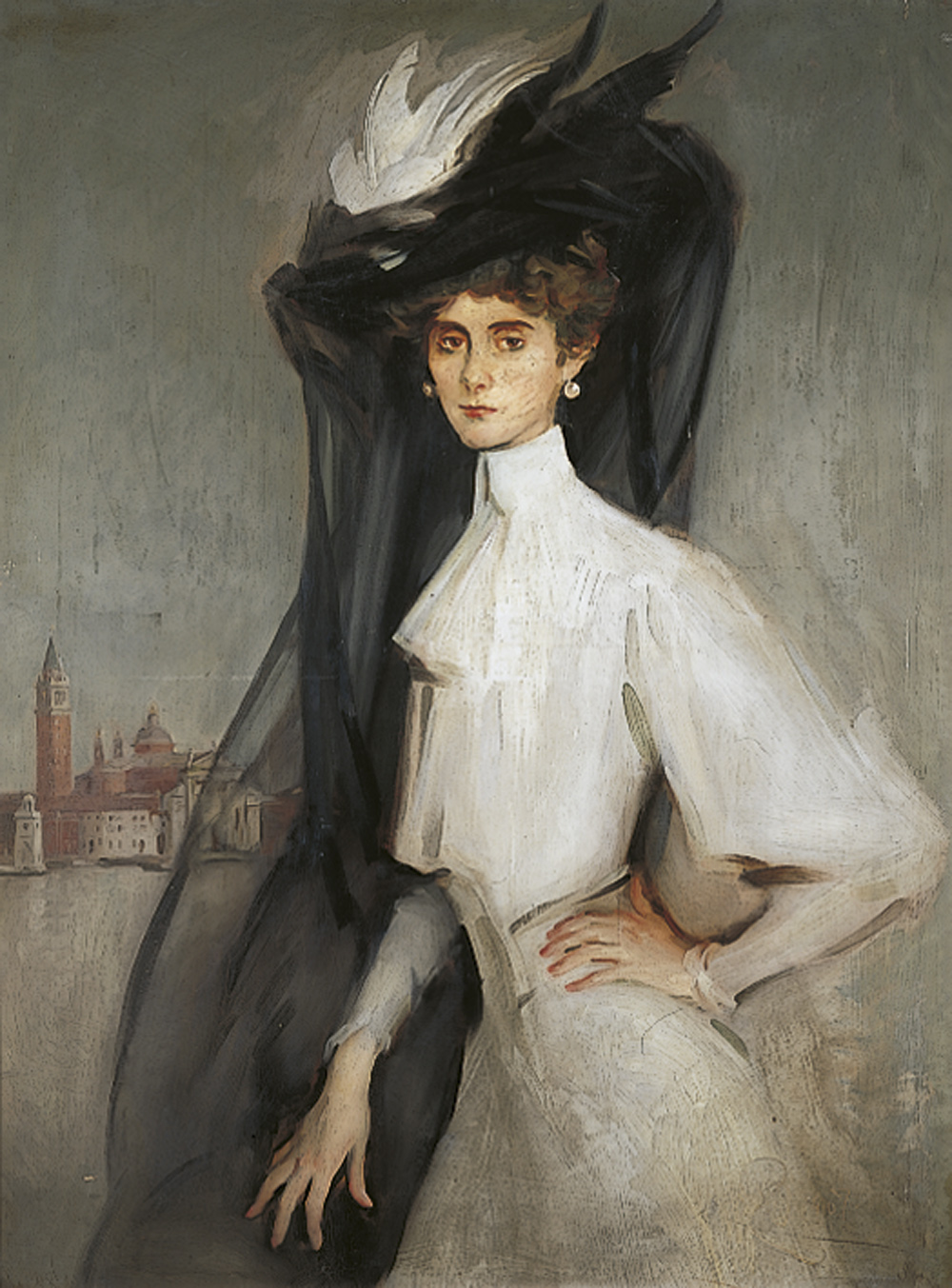
Olga de Meyer, 1907

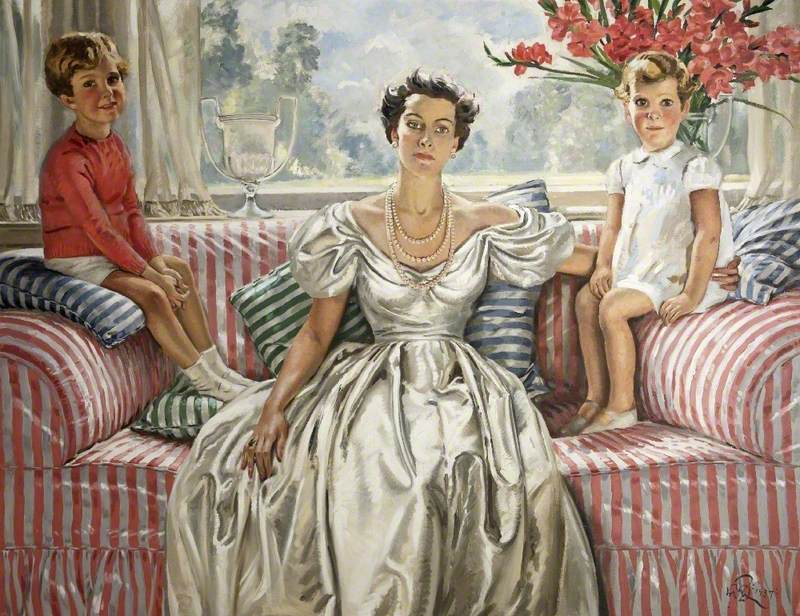
The Open Window, These Are My Jewels, 1937

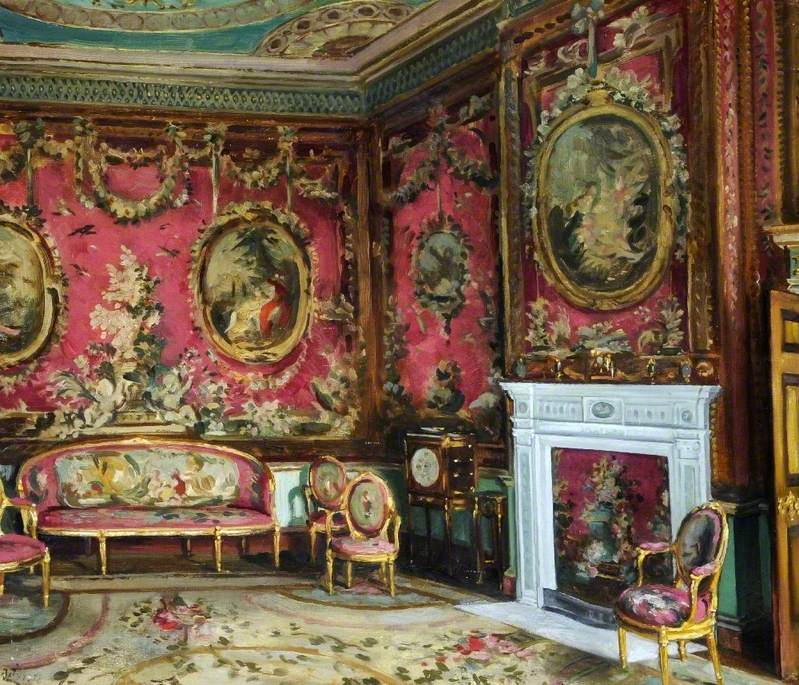
Osterley Park, London, Interior, 1931

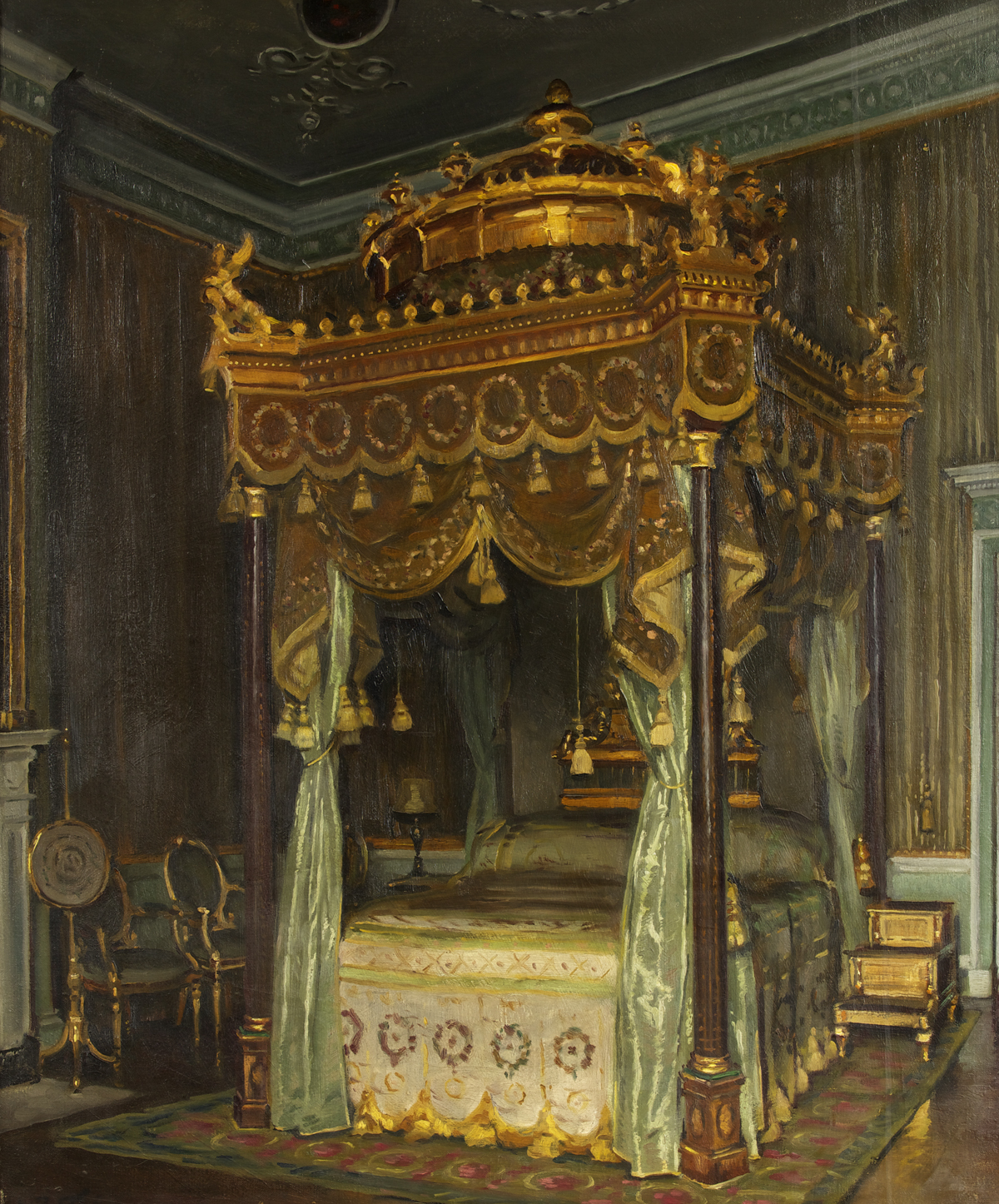
State Bed at Osterley Park, 1931

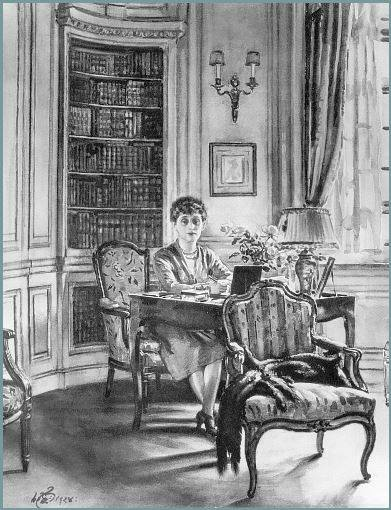
Mrs. Otto Hermann Kahn (Addie Wolff), 1928

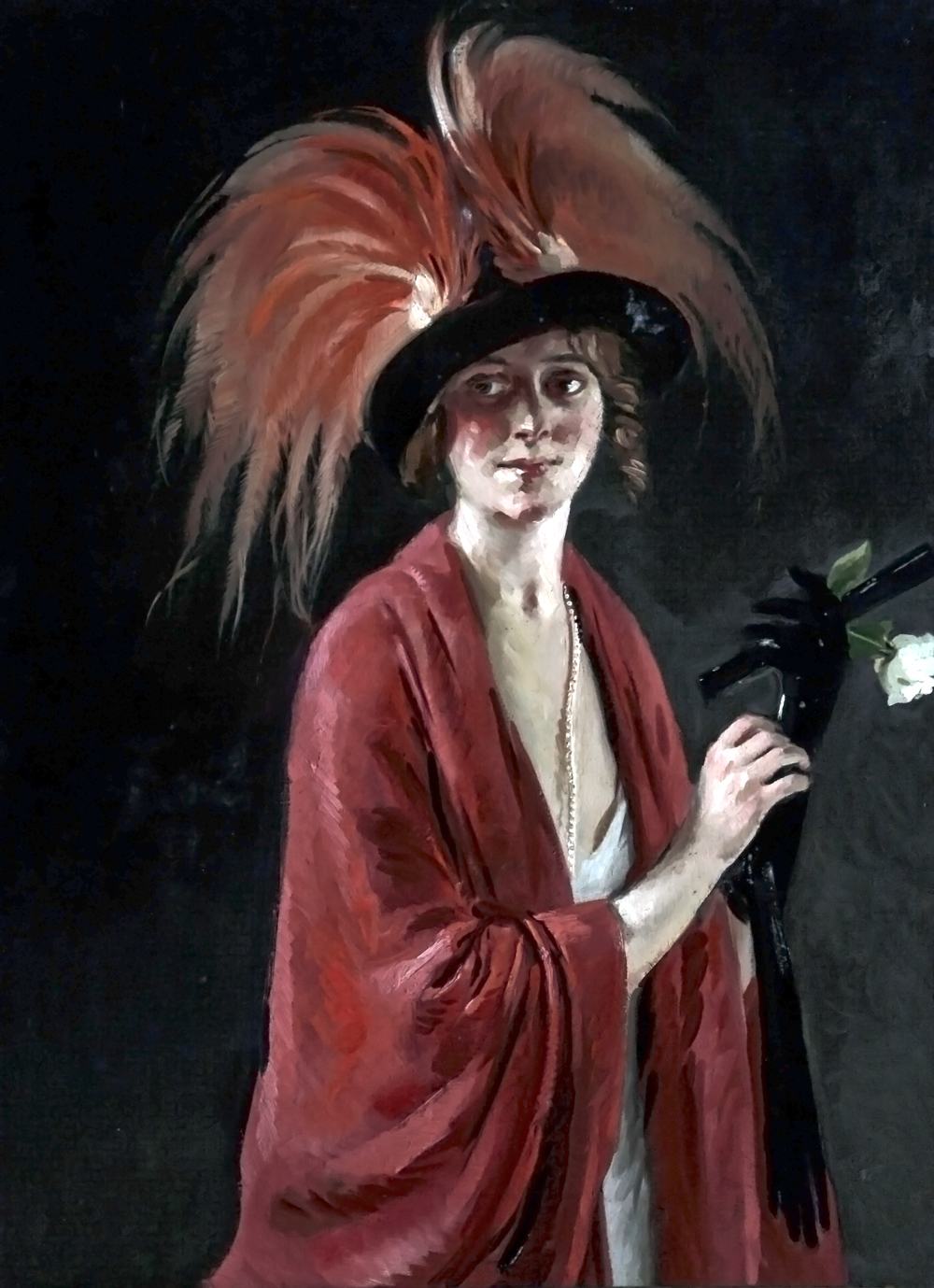
Paradise Plumes and Red Shawl, 1925

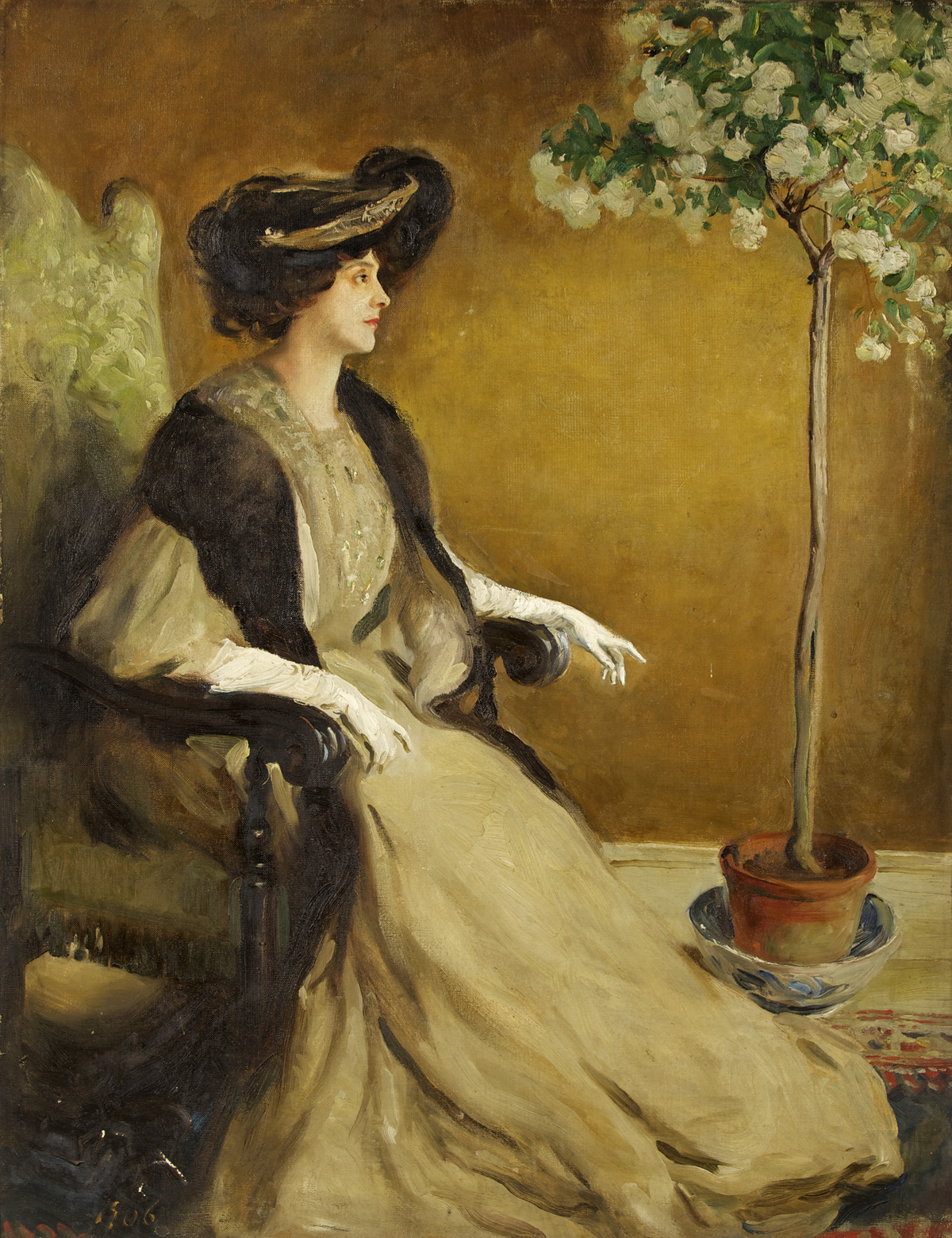
Mrs Patrick Campbell

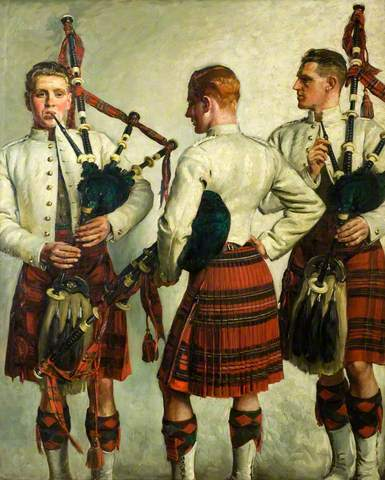
Pipe Practice, 1918

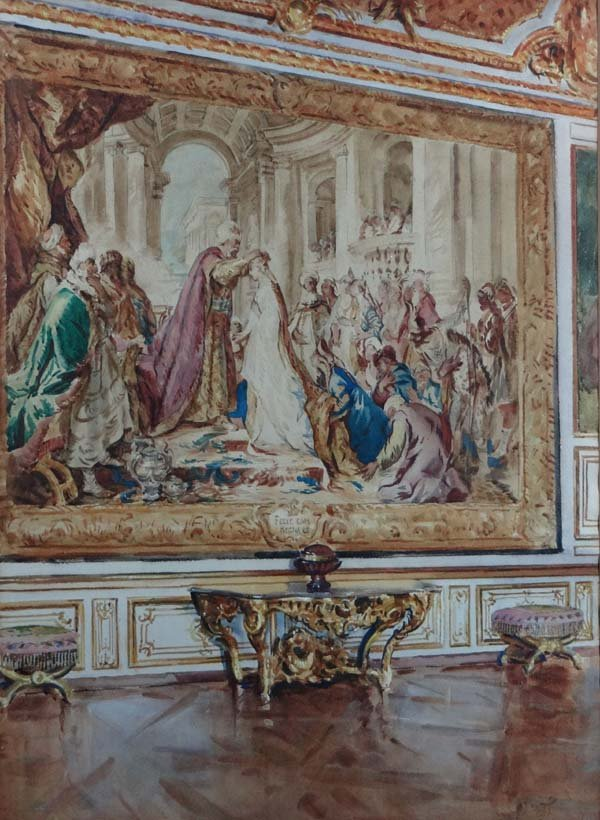
The Dining Room of 20 Portman Square, London, 1913

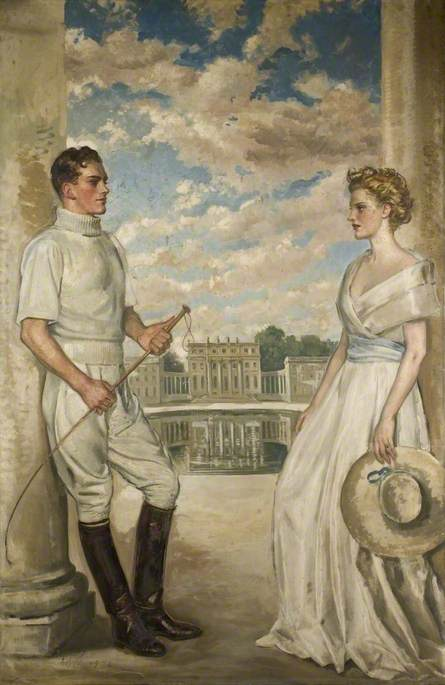
Portrait Group, 1936

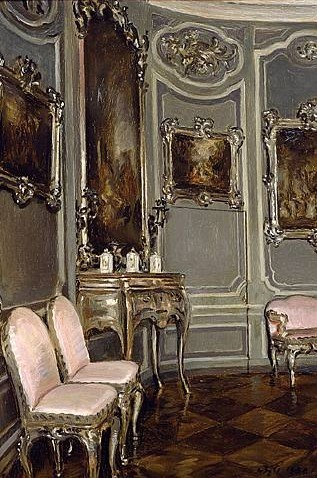
Tea Room, City Palace, Potsdam, 1930

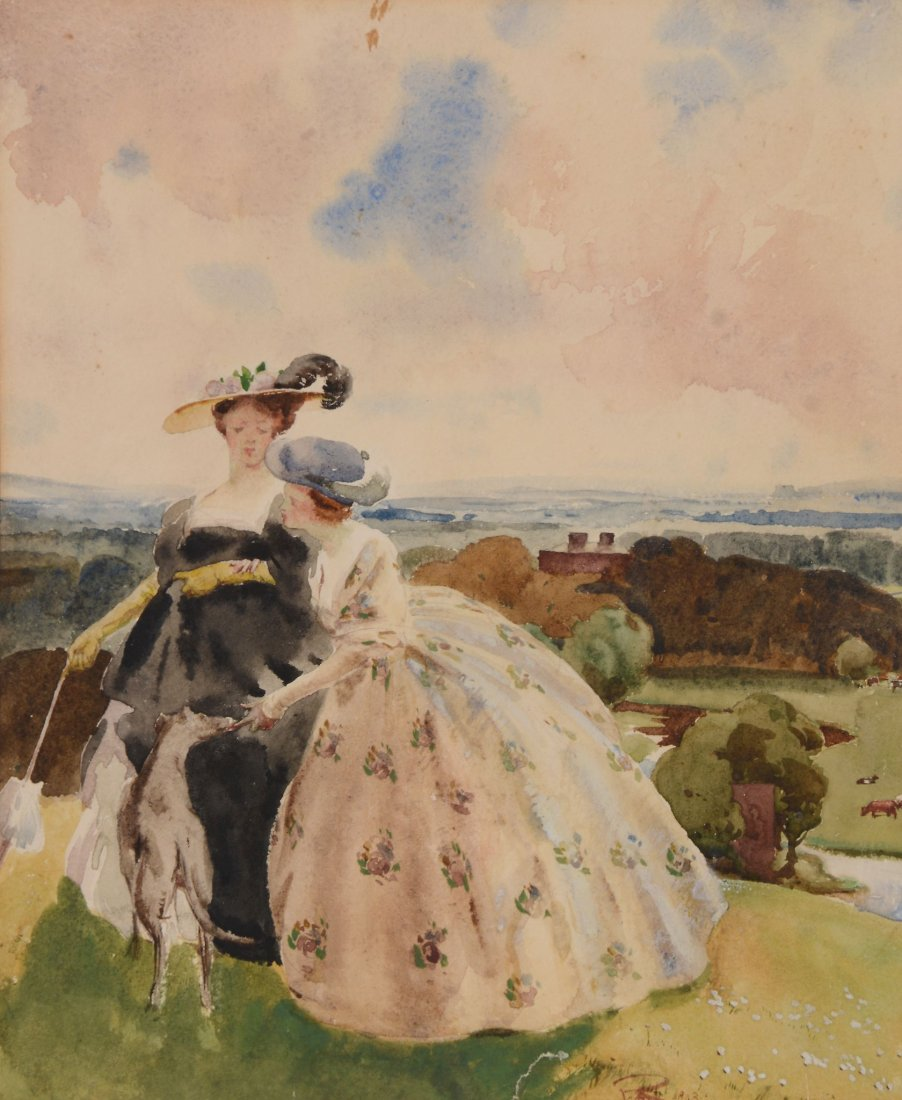
The Promenade, 1904

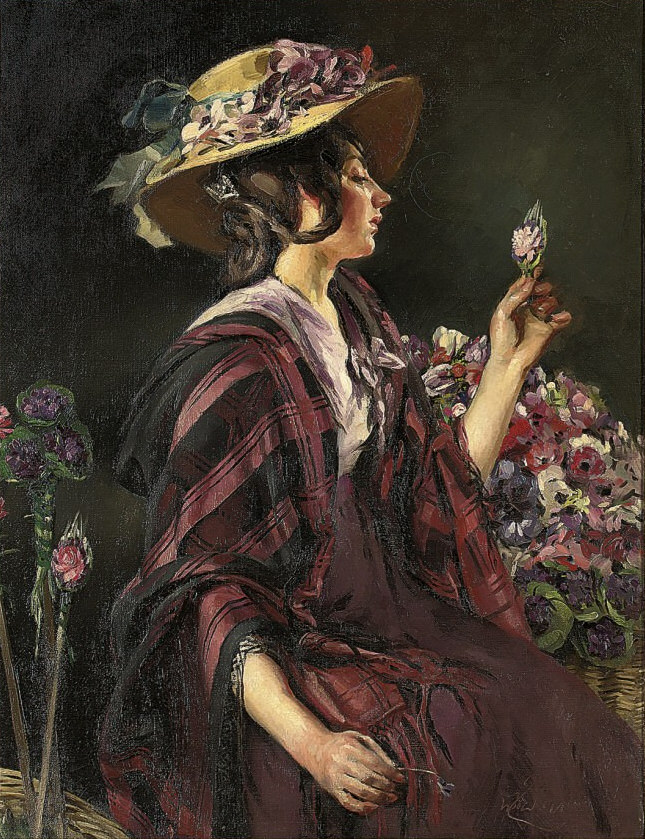
Pygmalion, 1914

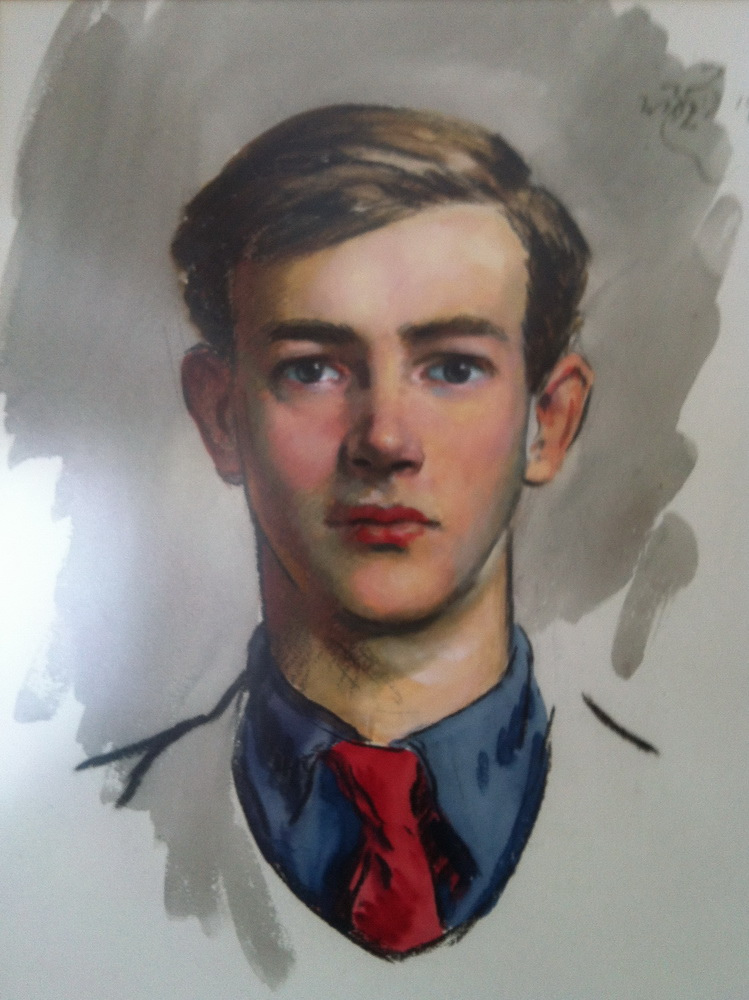
Robert Bruce, age 21, 1936

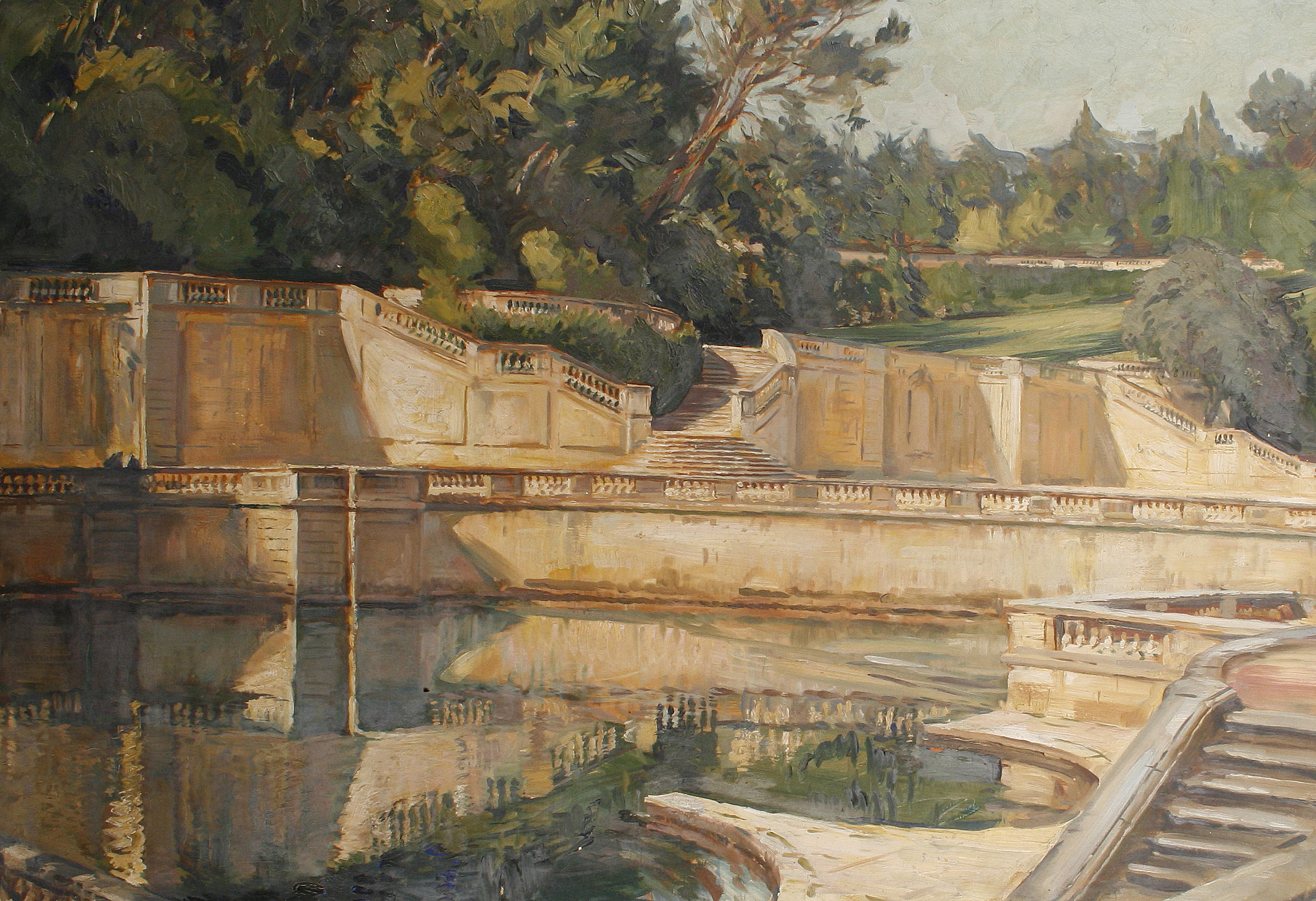
The Roman Gardens at Nîmes, ca 1912

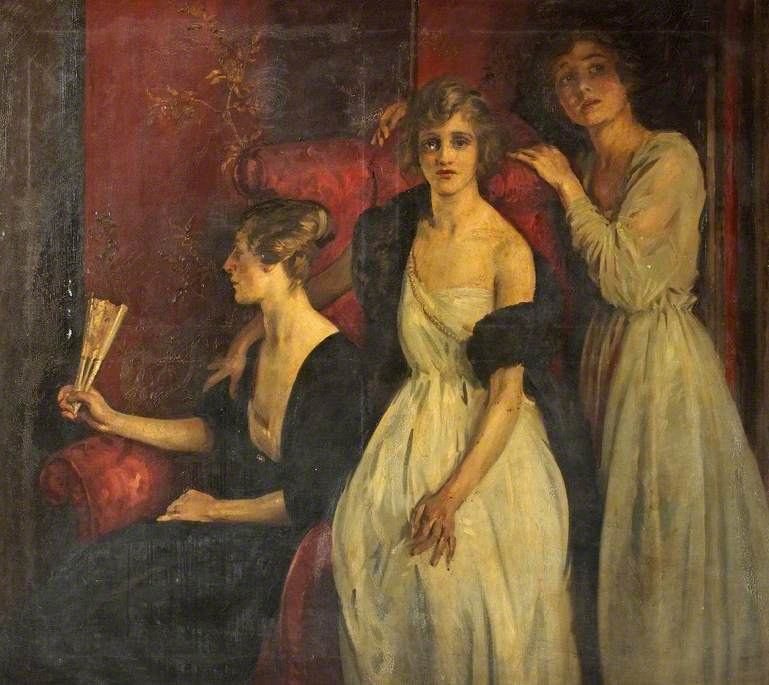
Rouge et noir, 1920

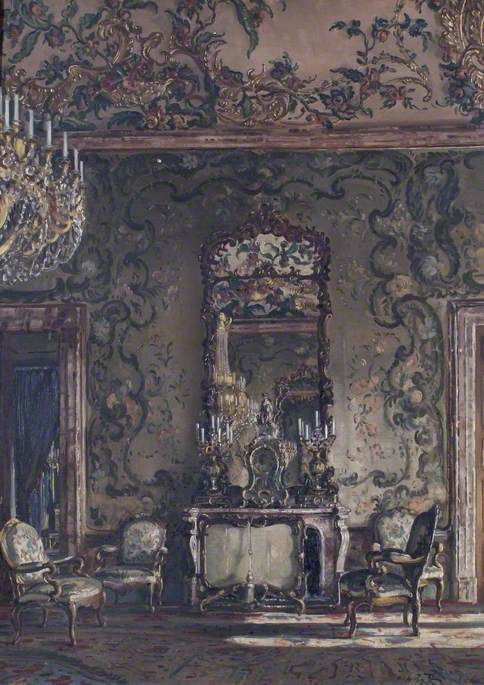
The Gasperini Room, Royal Palace of Madrid, Spain, 1927

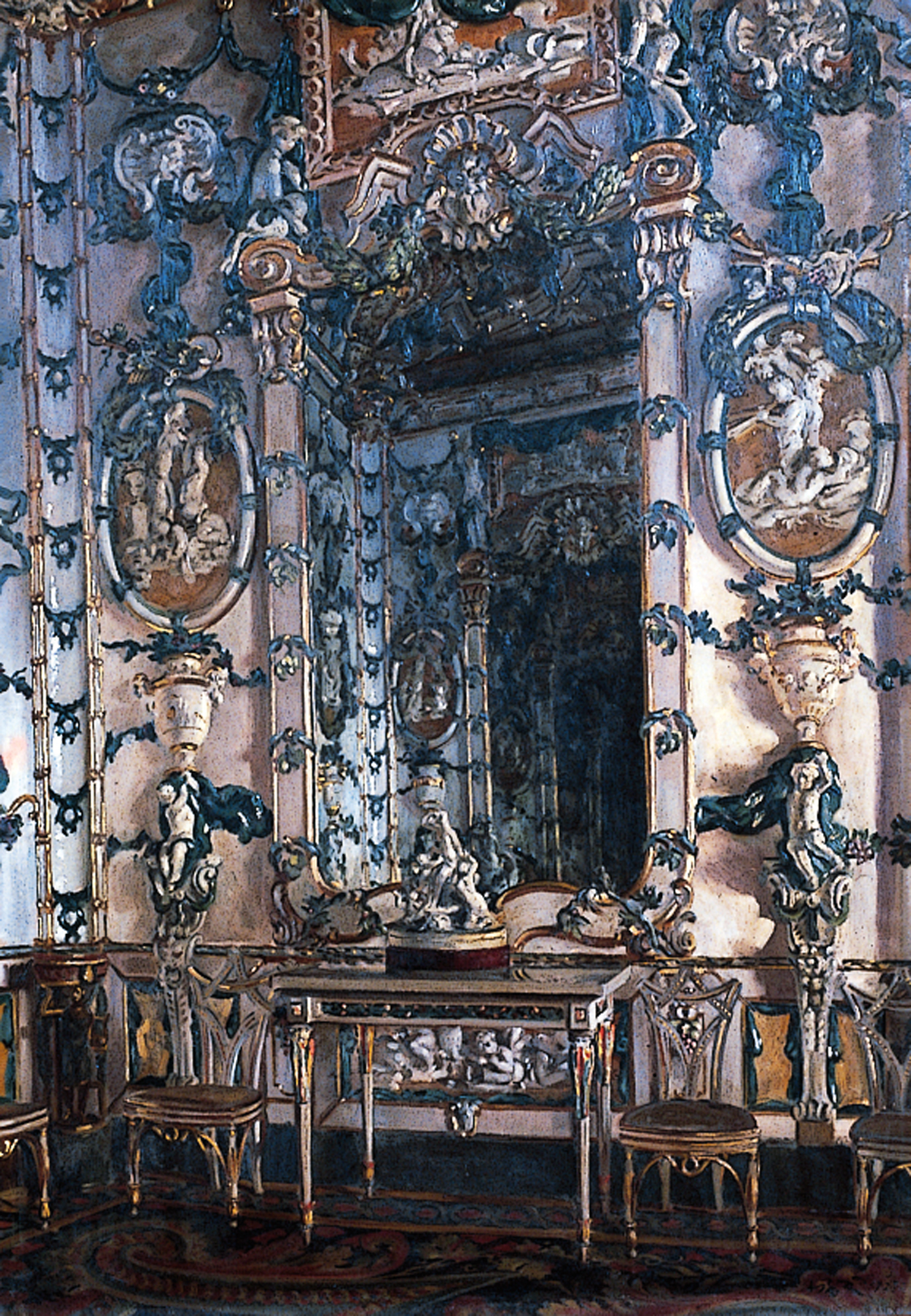
The Porcelain Room, Royal Palace of Madrid, 1927

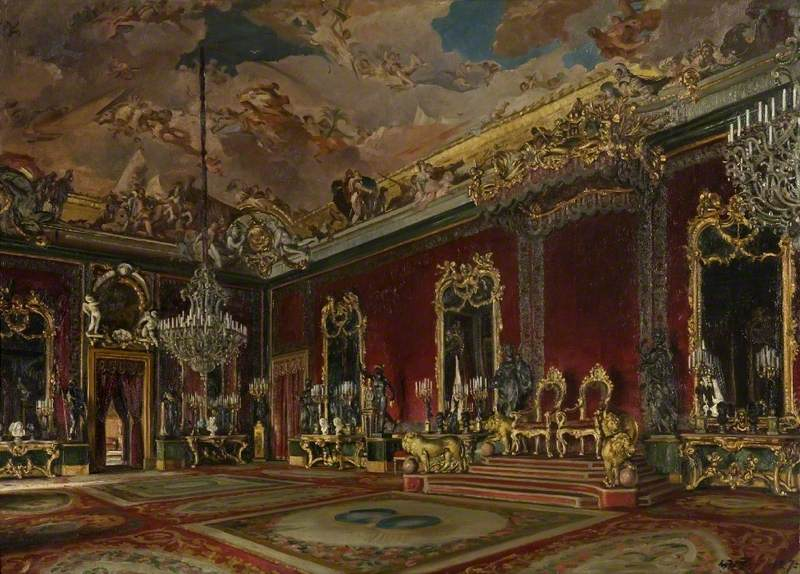
The Throne Room, Royal Palace of Madrid, 1927

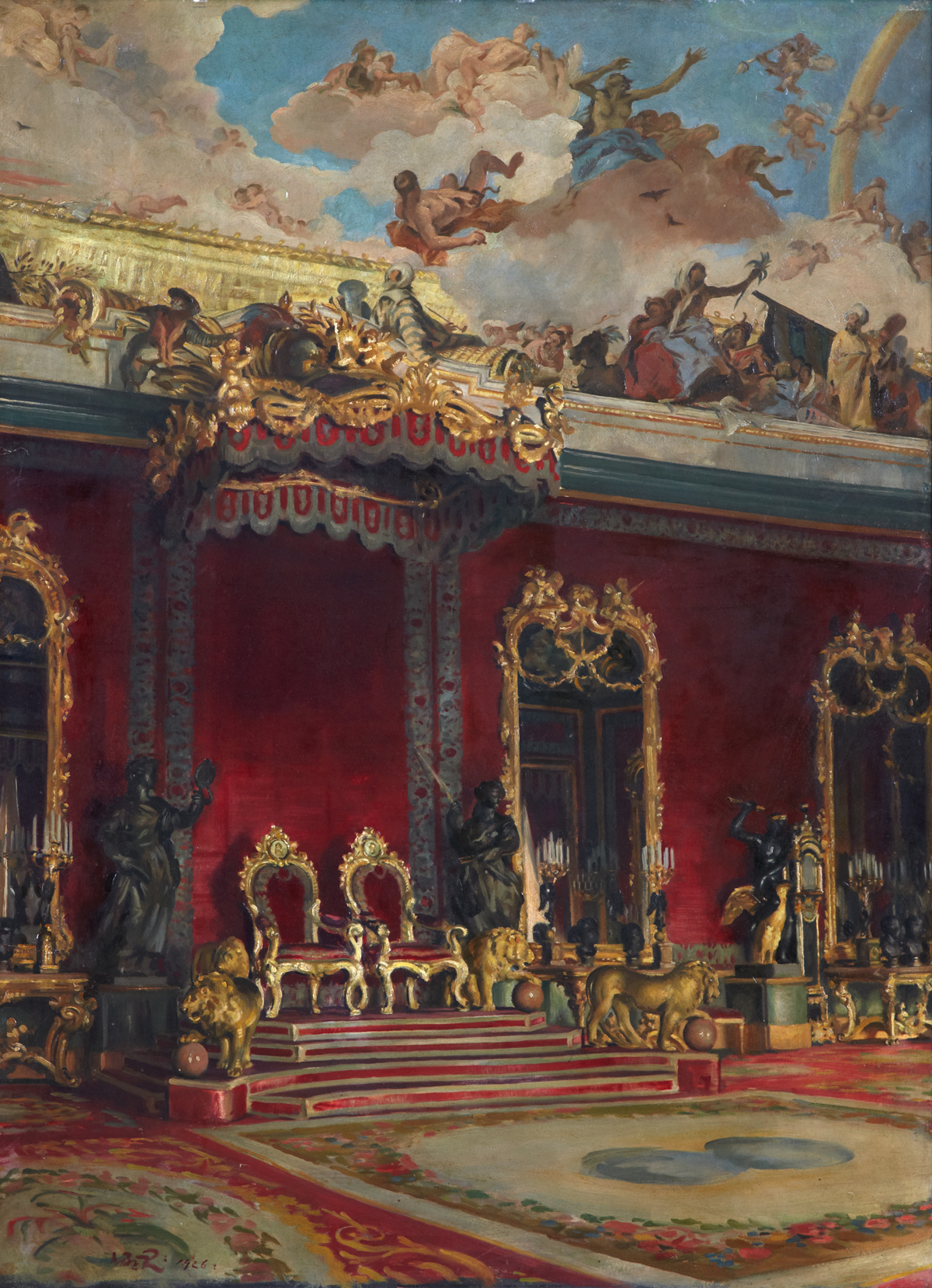
The Throne Room, Royal Palace of Madrid, 1927

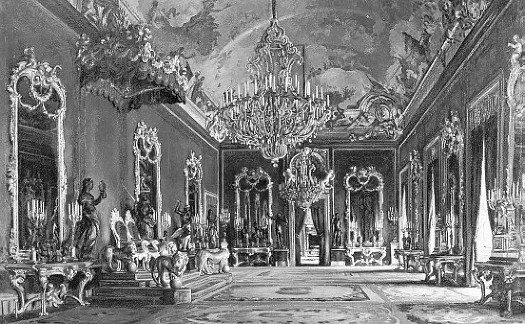
The Throne Room, Royal Palace of Madrid, 1927

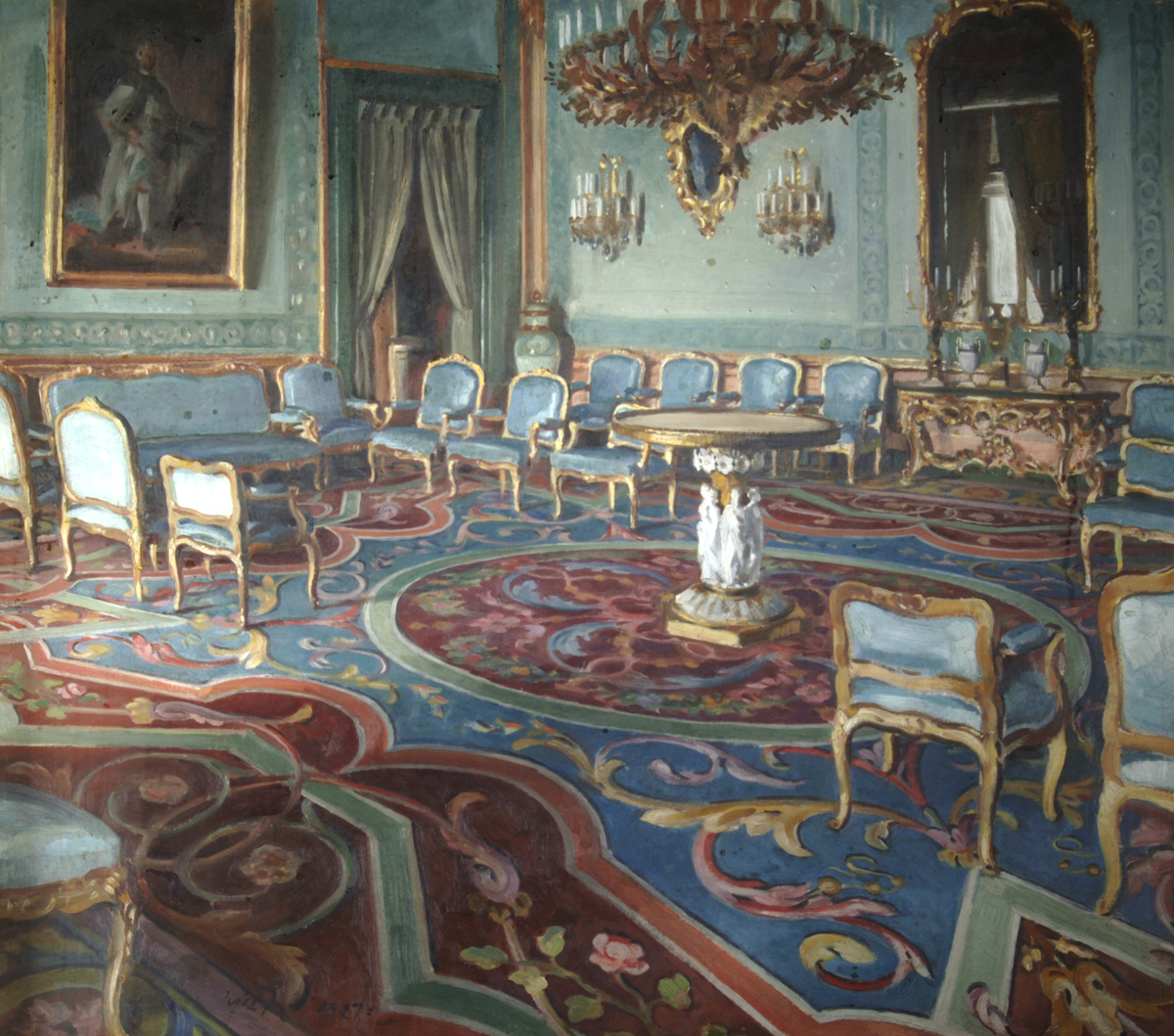
Salon of Charles III, Royal Palace of Madrid, 1927

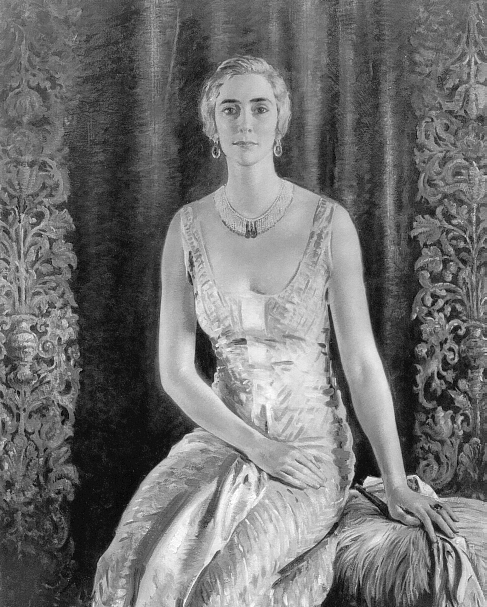
Mrs. Samuel L. M. Barlow II (decorator Ernesta Beaux), 1933

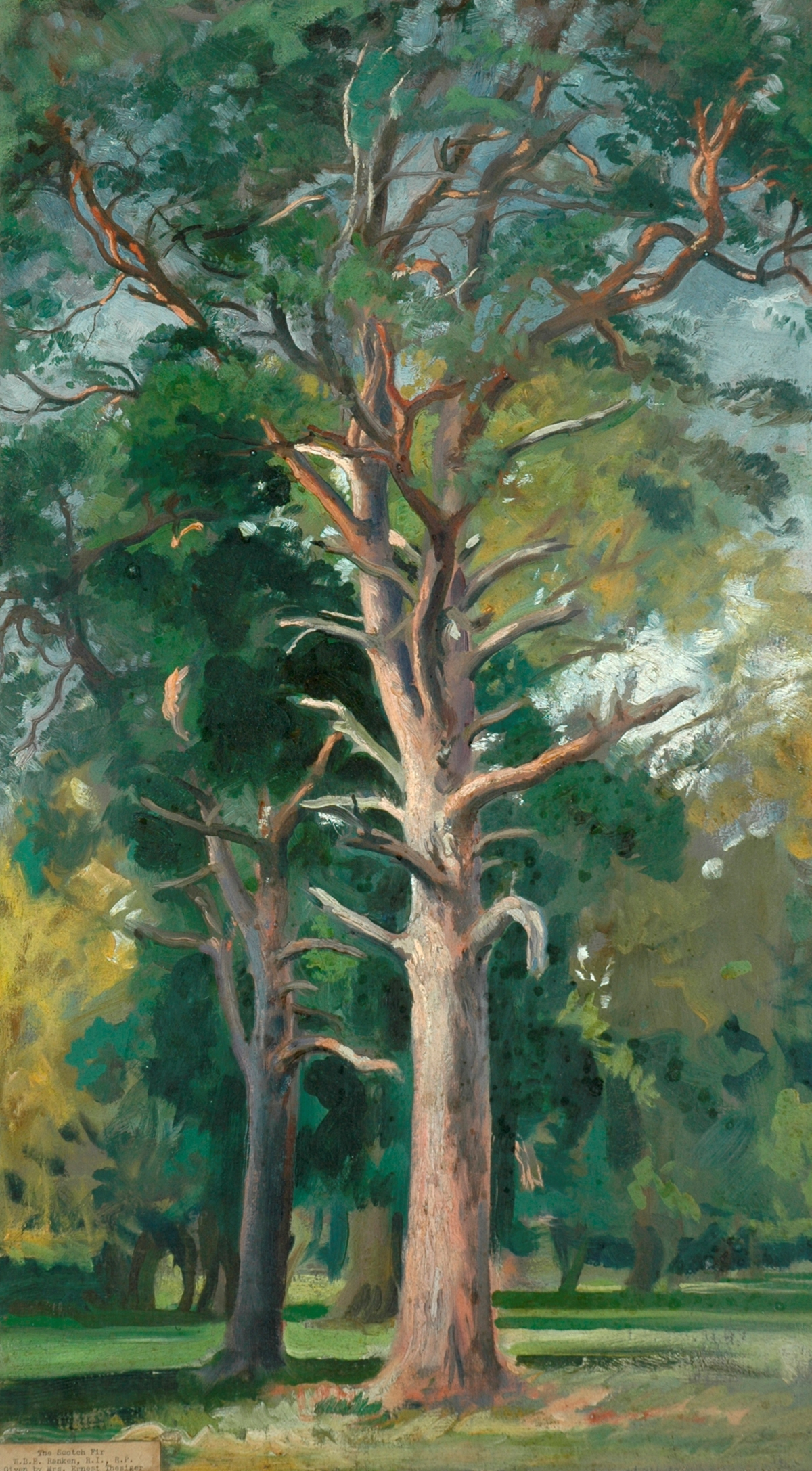
The Scotch Fir

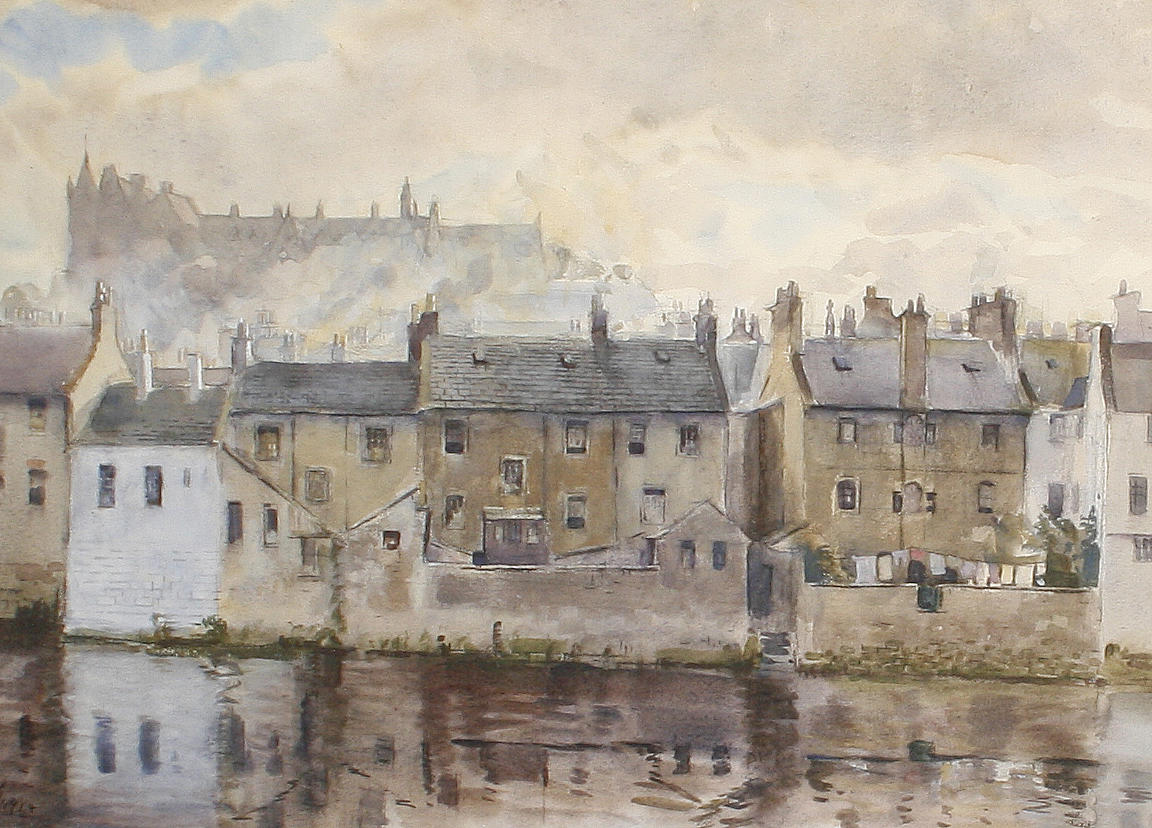
Scottish Town, 1914

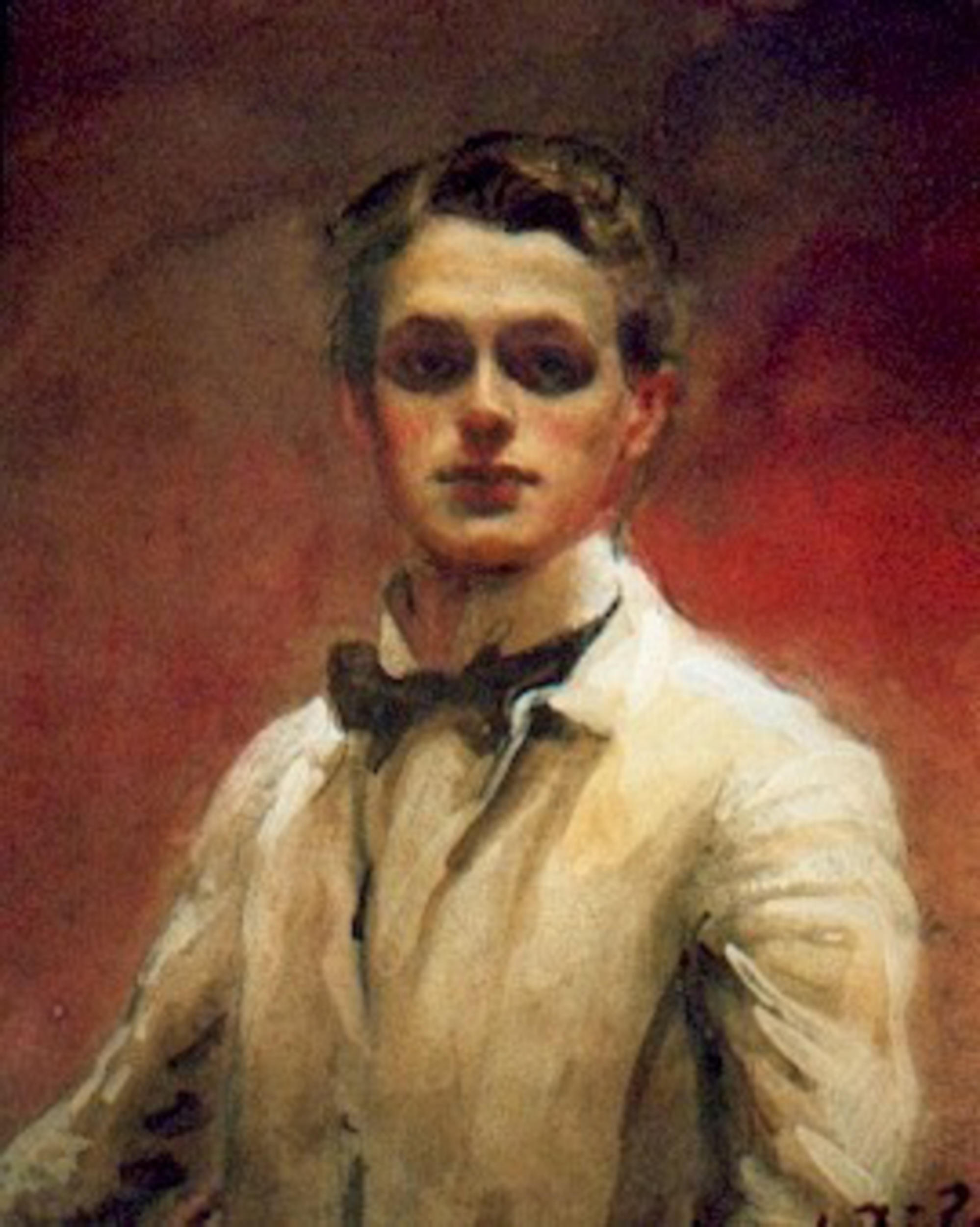
Self-Portrait, 1904

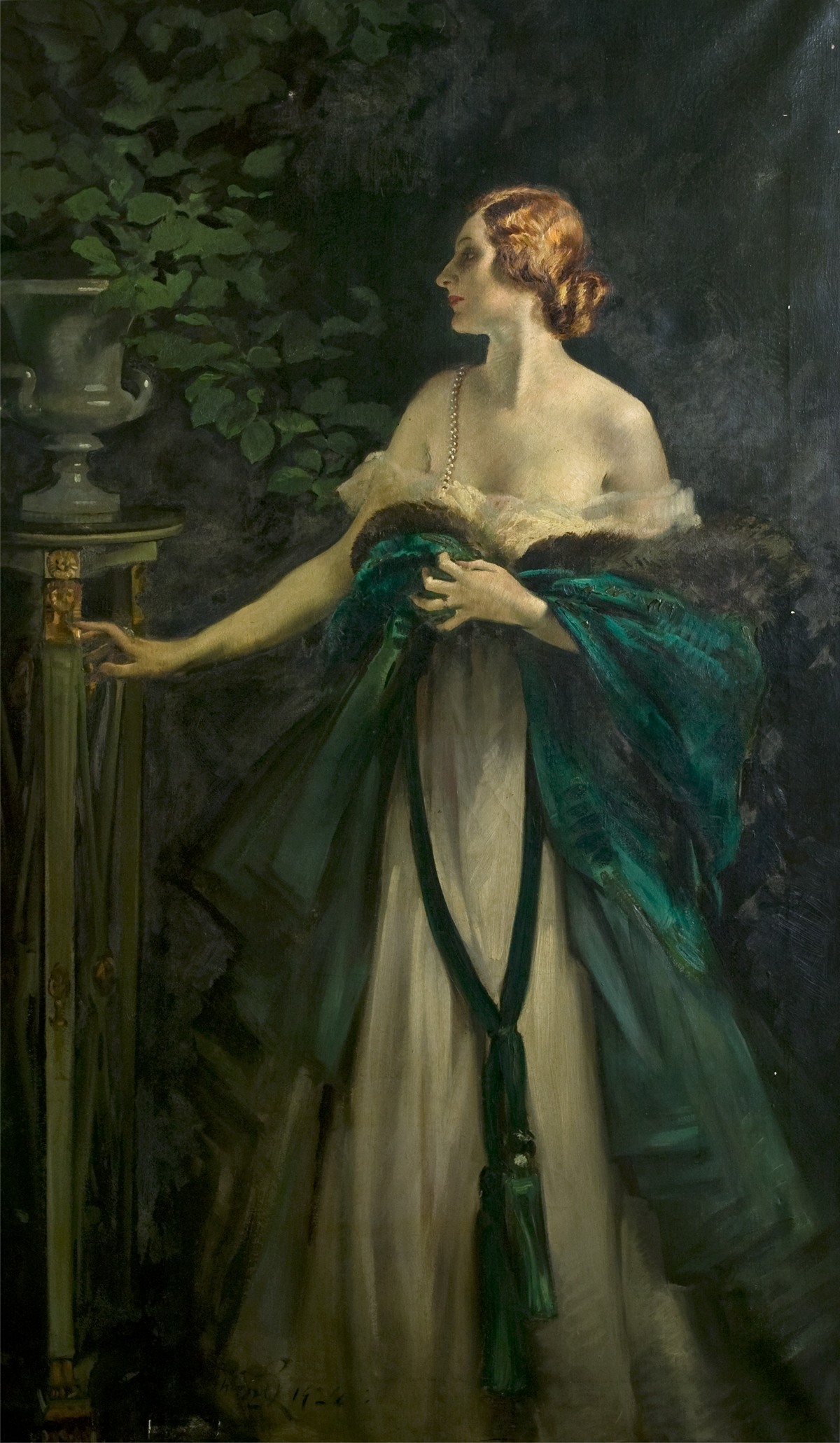
Silver and Green, 1928

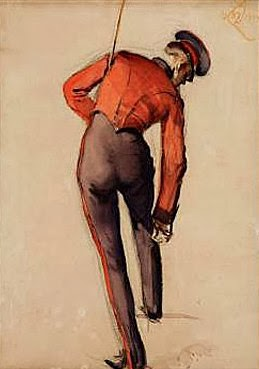
Soldier back, 1913

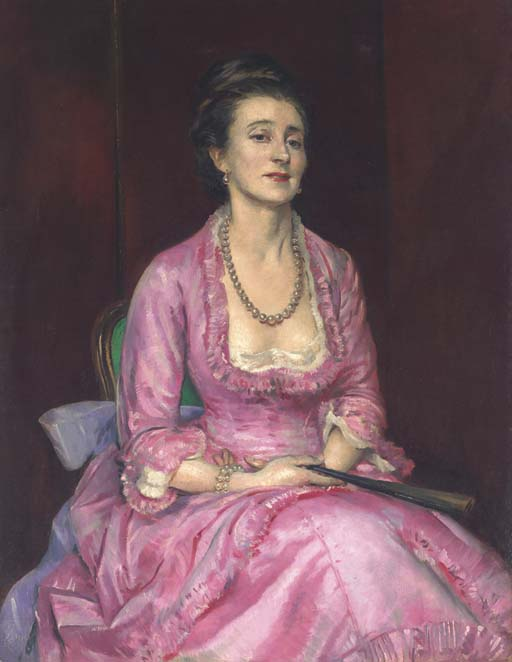
Souvenir of the Seventies (Portrait de Mrs Kesley), 1923

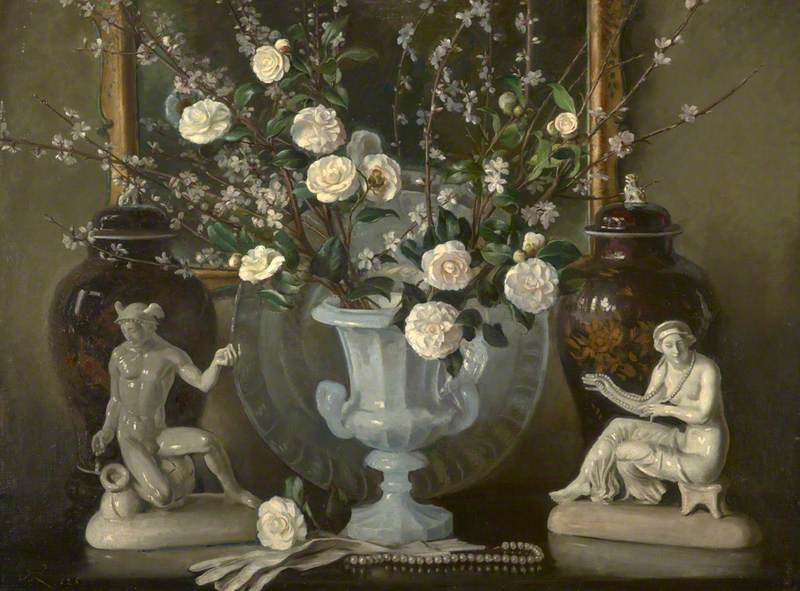
Still Life, Black and White, 1925

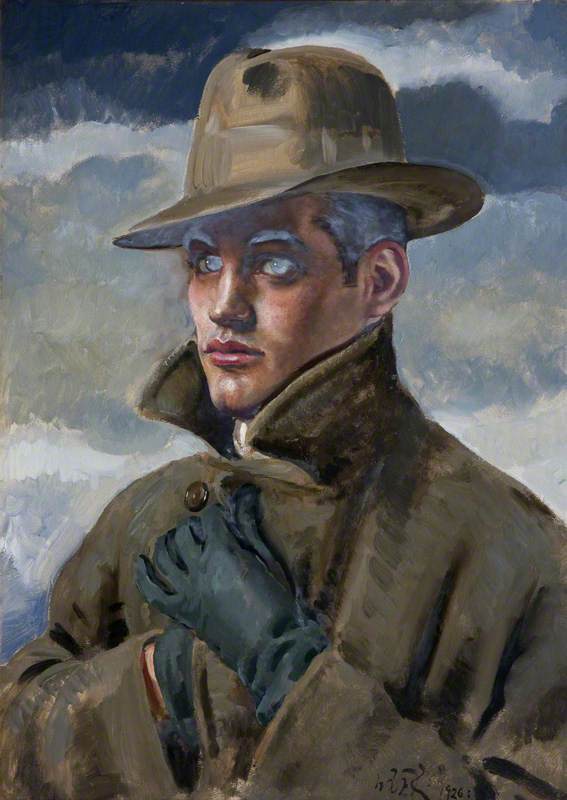
Stormy Day, 1926

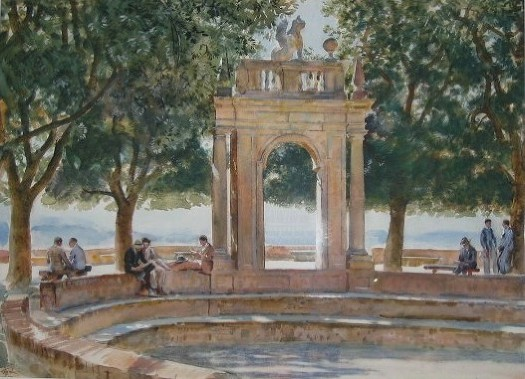
Students at Perugia

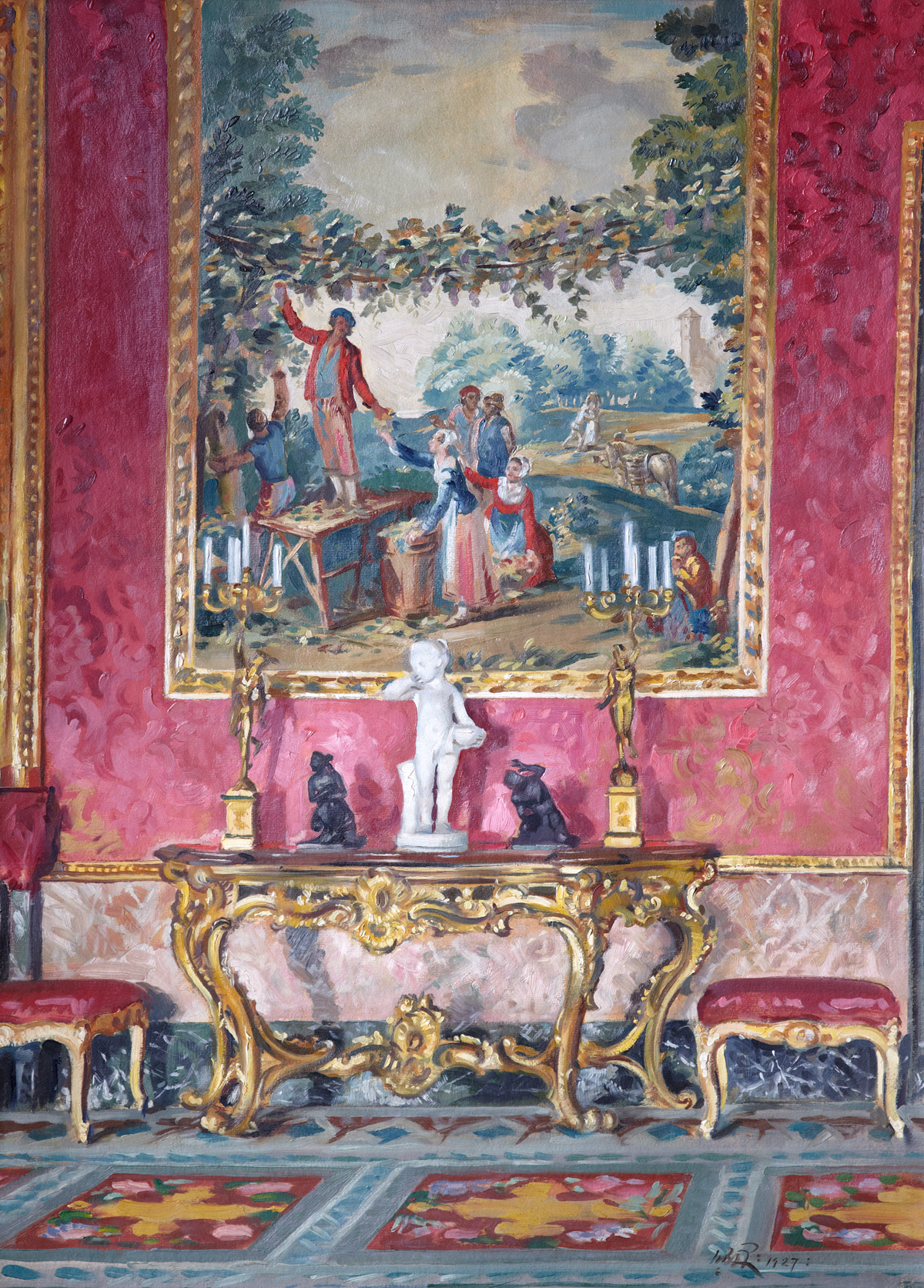
The Tapestry Panel

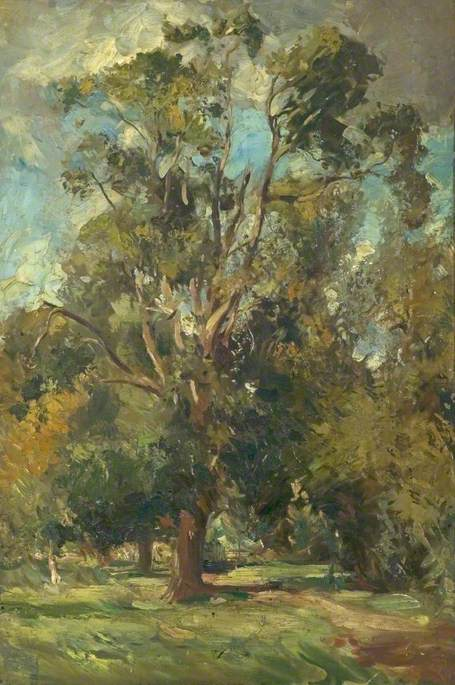
Trees

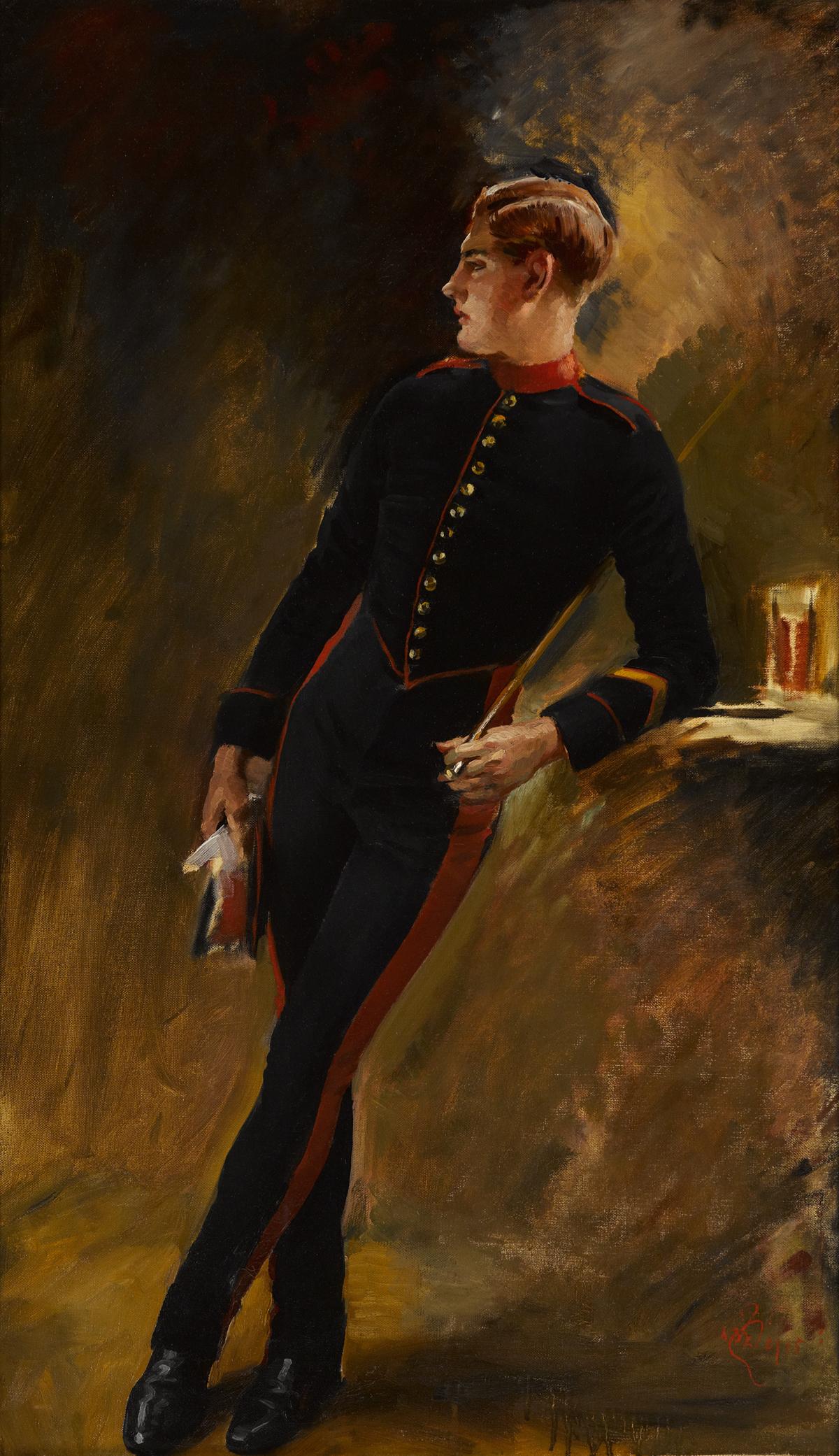
Trooper of Royal Horse Guards, in Walking-Out Dress, 1915

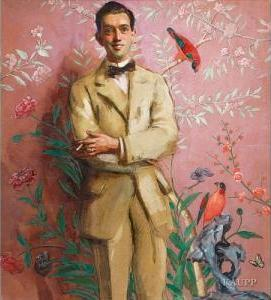
Unknown Man

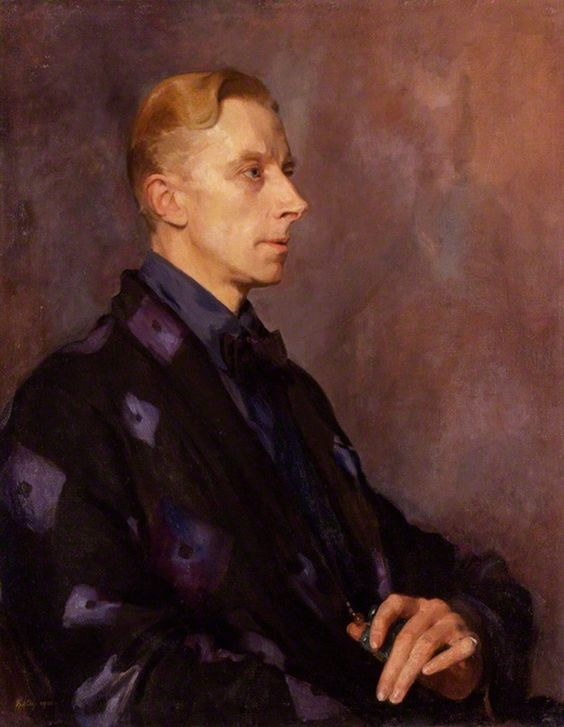
Unknown Man, 1919

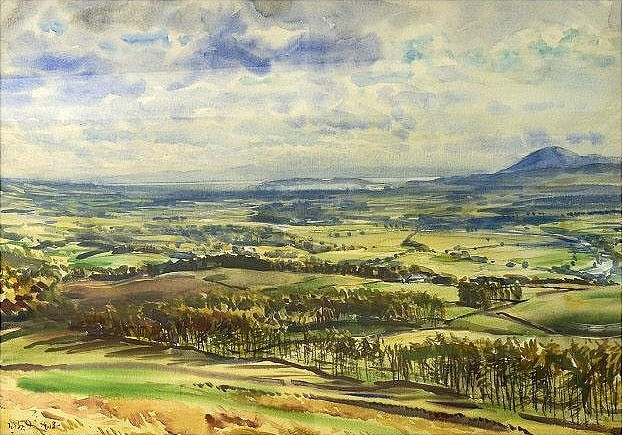
The Valley of the Nith, 1913

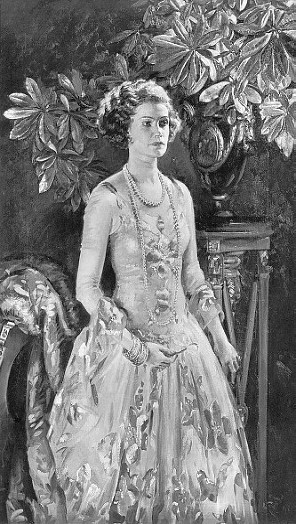
Venetia, ca 1928

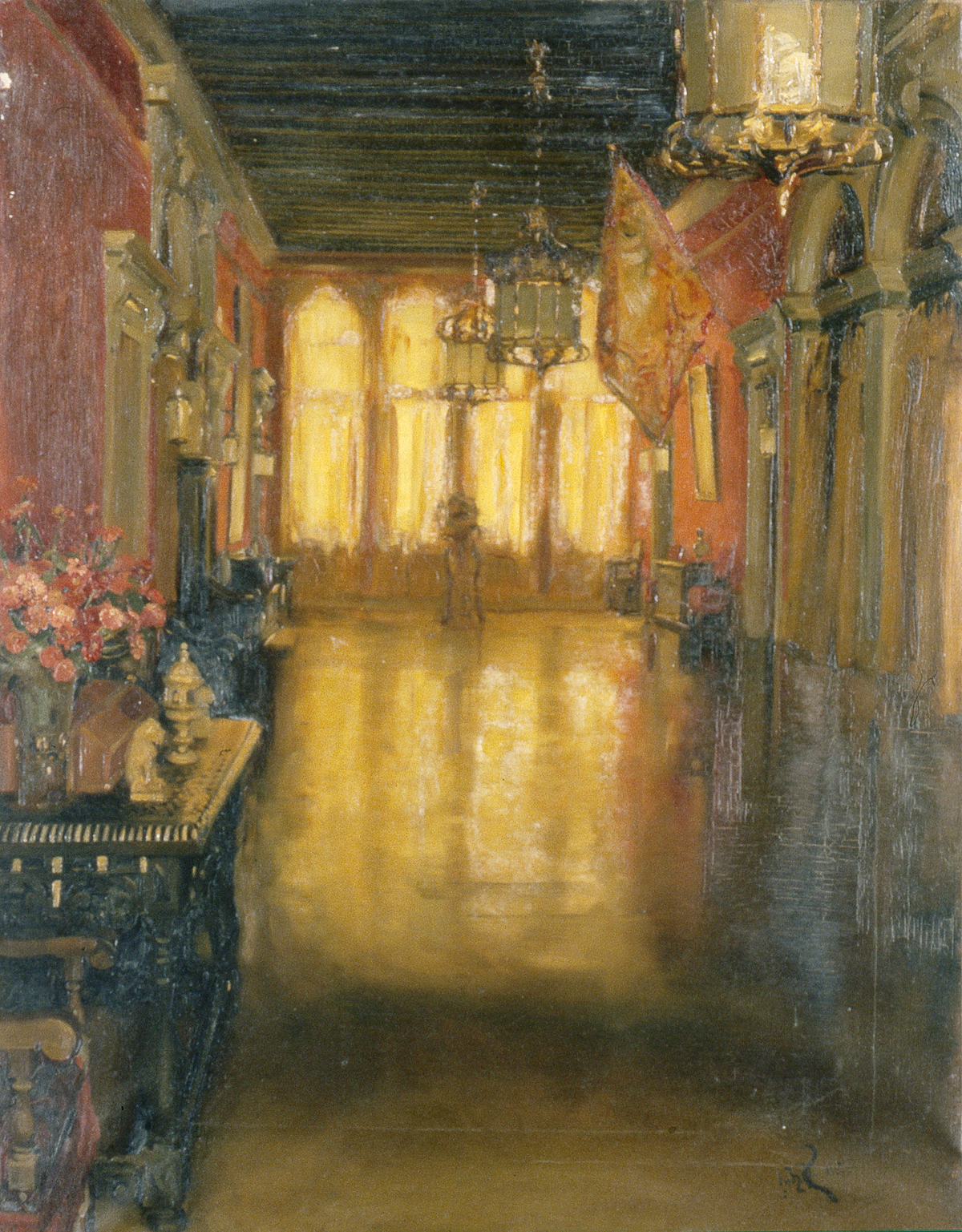
A Venetian Gala, 1907

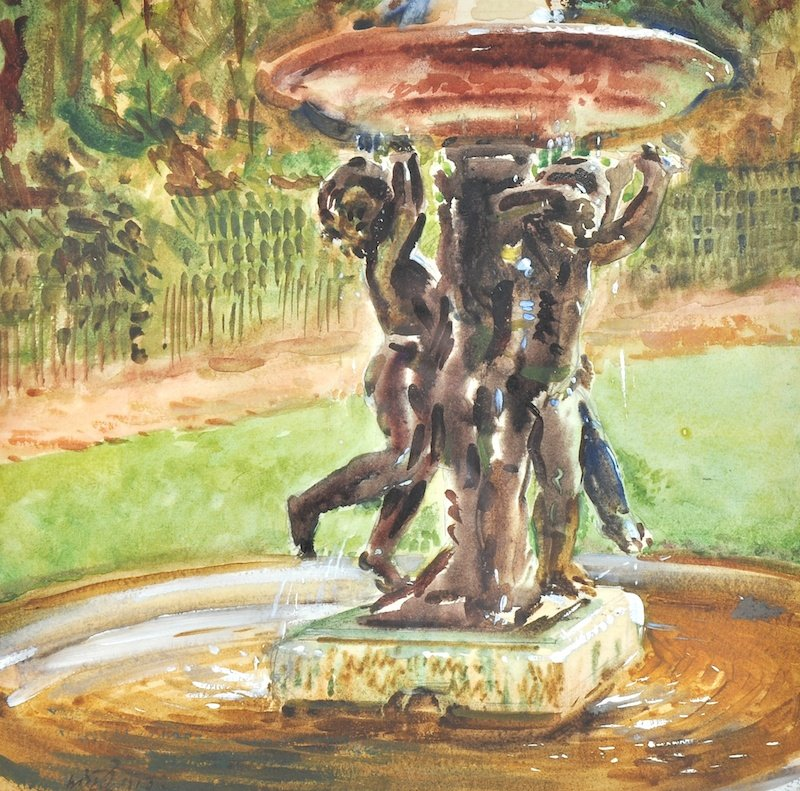
A Dripping Fountain, Palace of Versailles, 1927

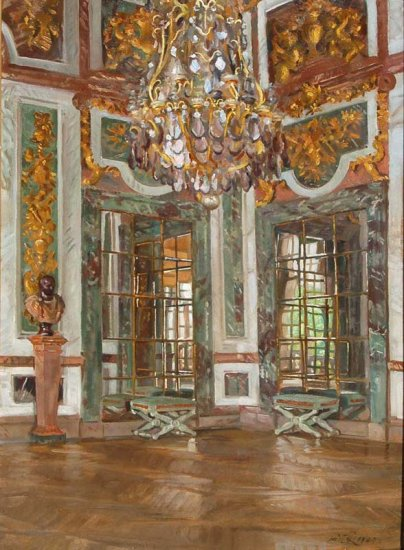
La Galerie des Glaces, Palace of Versailles, 1927

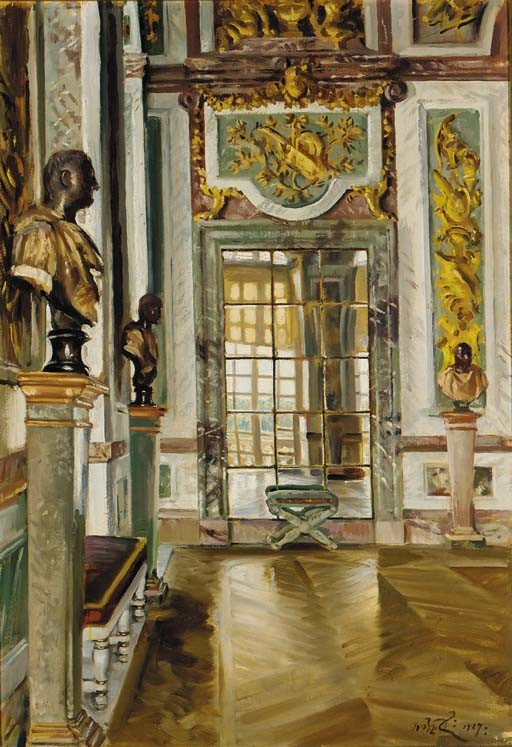
Salon de la Paix, Palace of Versailles, 1927

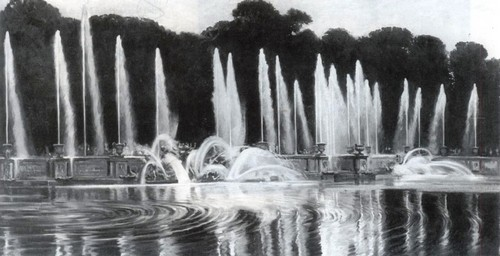
Fountains at Palace of Versailles, 1939

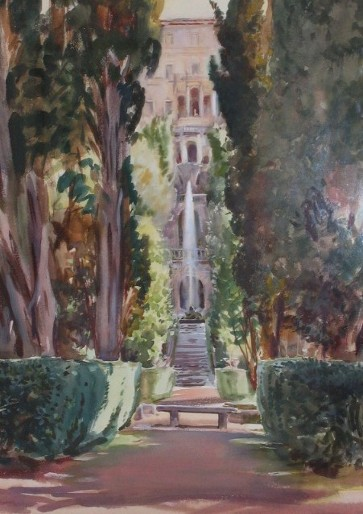
Villa d'Este, Tivoli

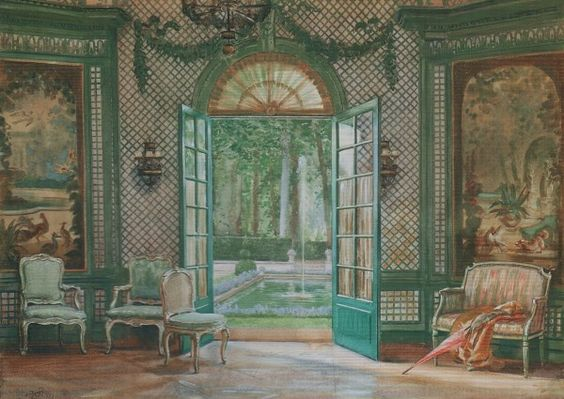
Interior of Elsie De Wolfe's music pavilion looking out on to the pool, The Villa Trianon, 1920-29

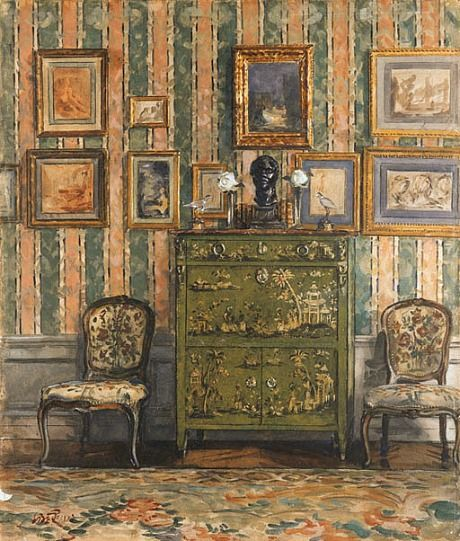
Elsie De Wolfe’s Green Lacquer Cabinet, The Villa Trianon, 1920-29

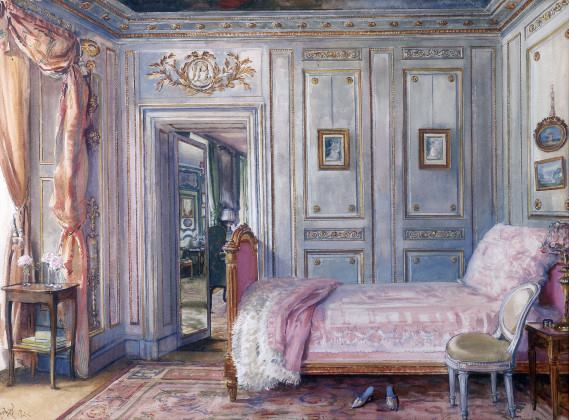
La Chambre de Elsie De Wolfe, The Villa Trianon, 1920-29

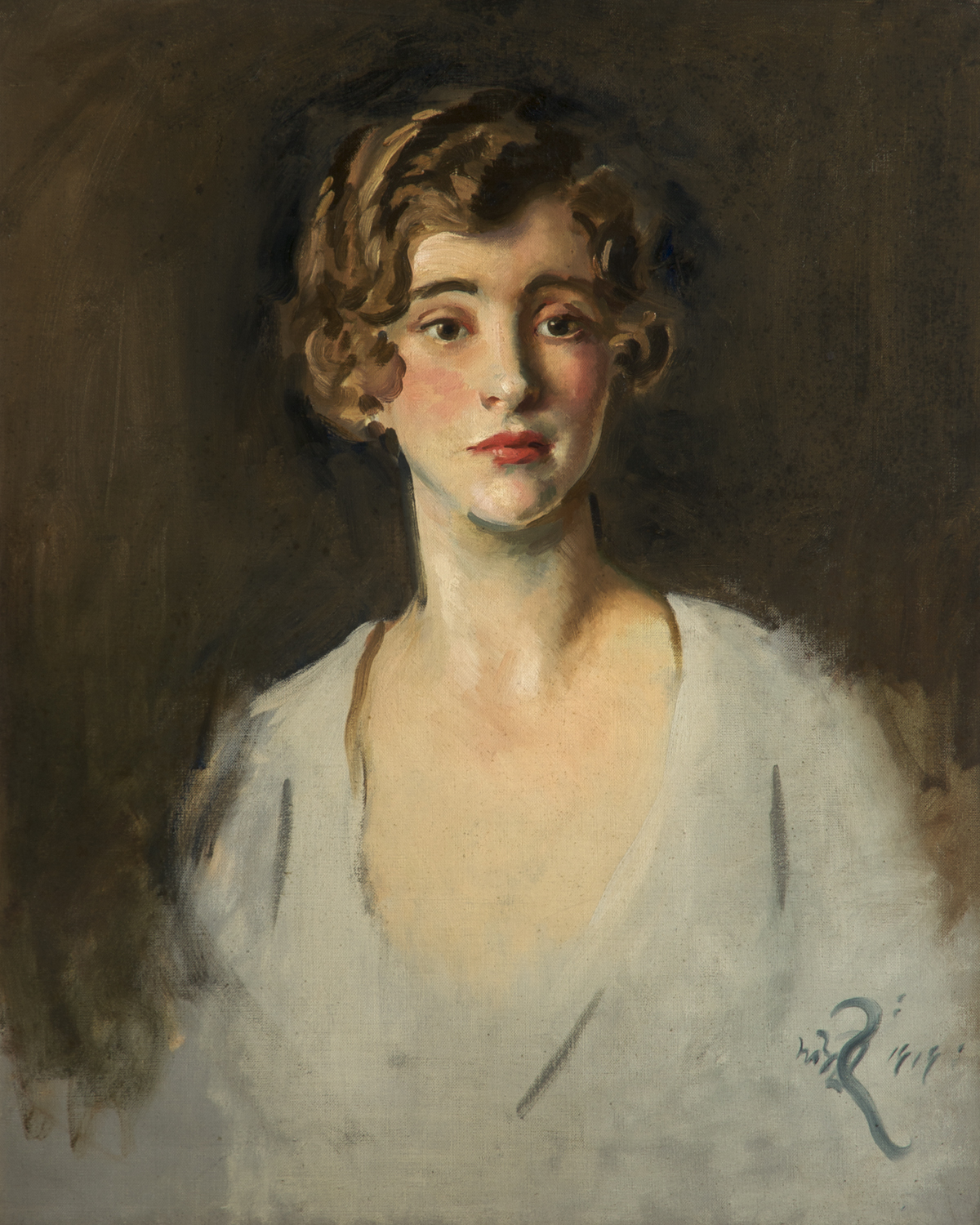
Violet Trefusis, 1919

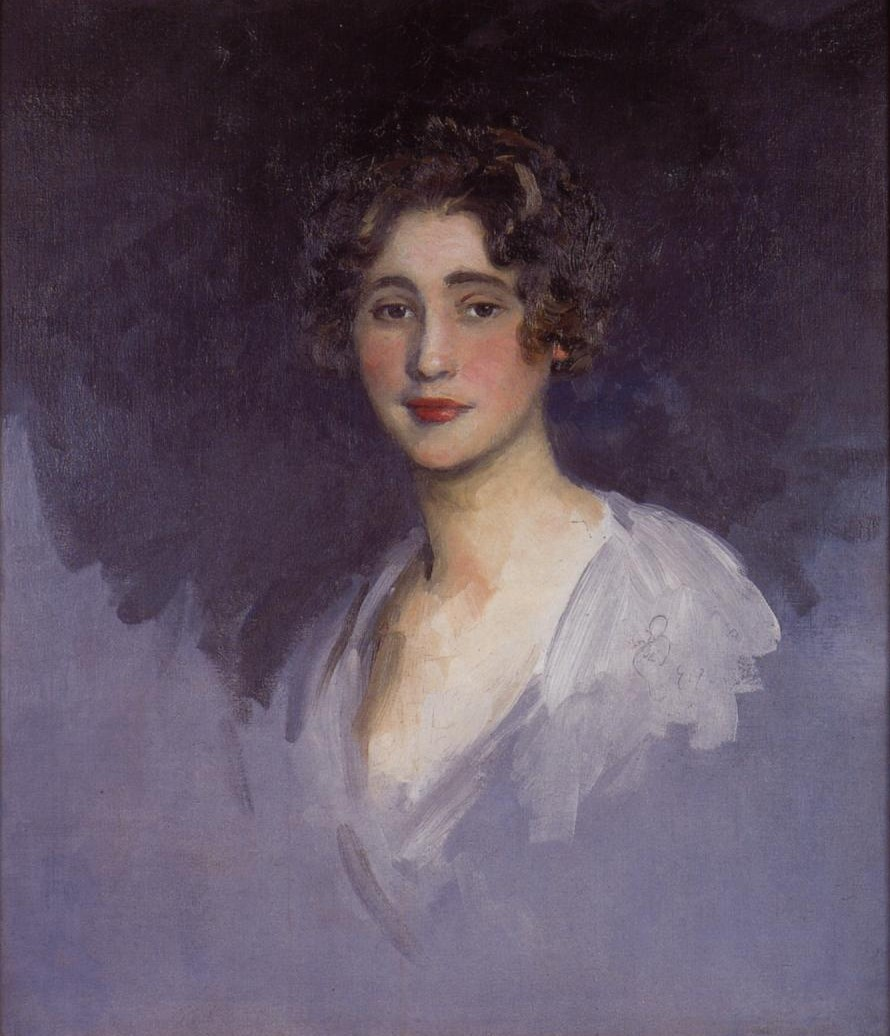
Violet Trefusis, 1919

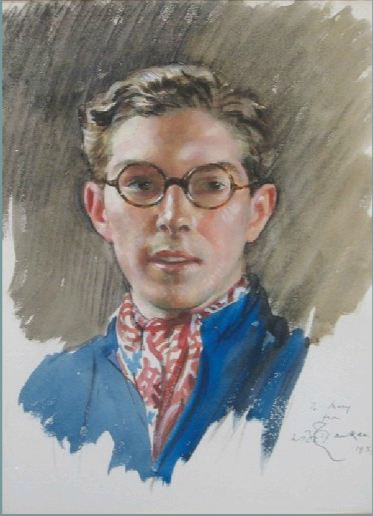
Prince Vsevolod Ivanovich of Russia, 1939

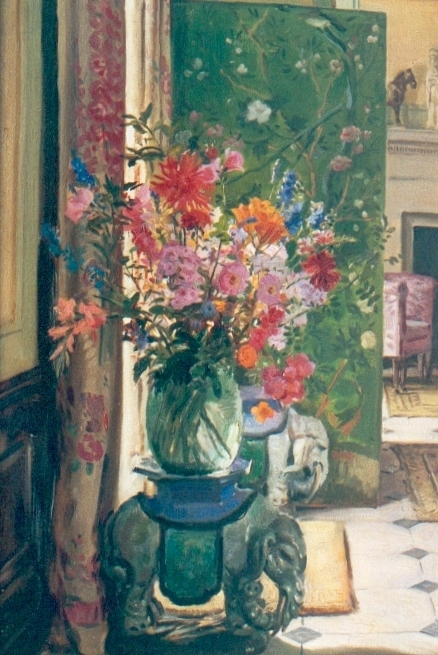
Elephants at Warbrook, 1930

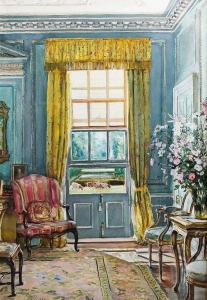
The Drawing Room at Warbrook, 1934

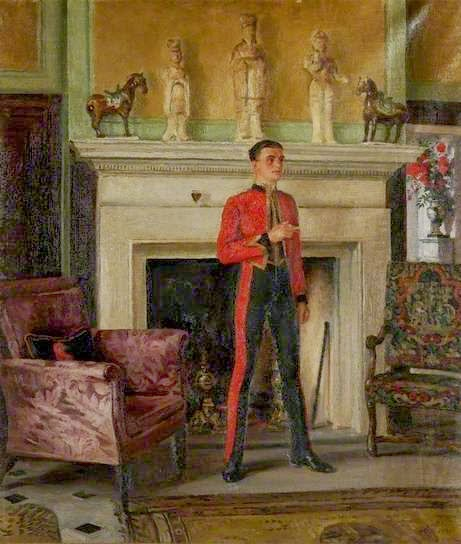
Hall at Warbrook, 1933

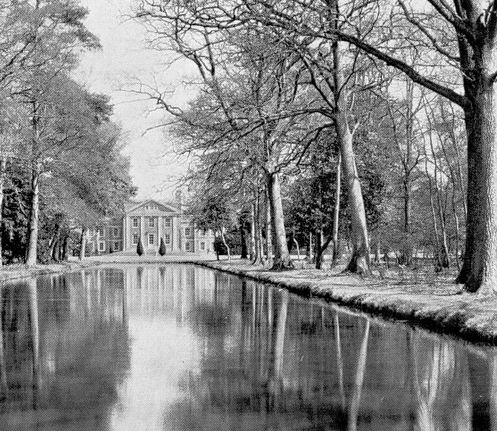
Warbrook House, Hampshire

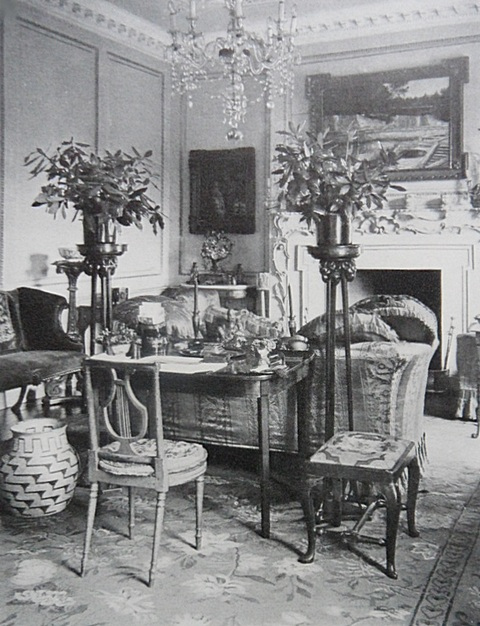
Drawing Room at Warbrook House

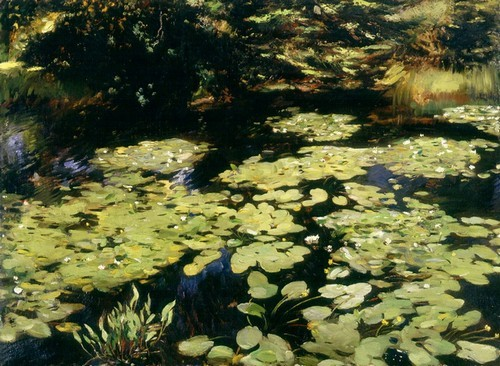
Water-lillies, 1910

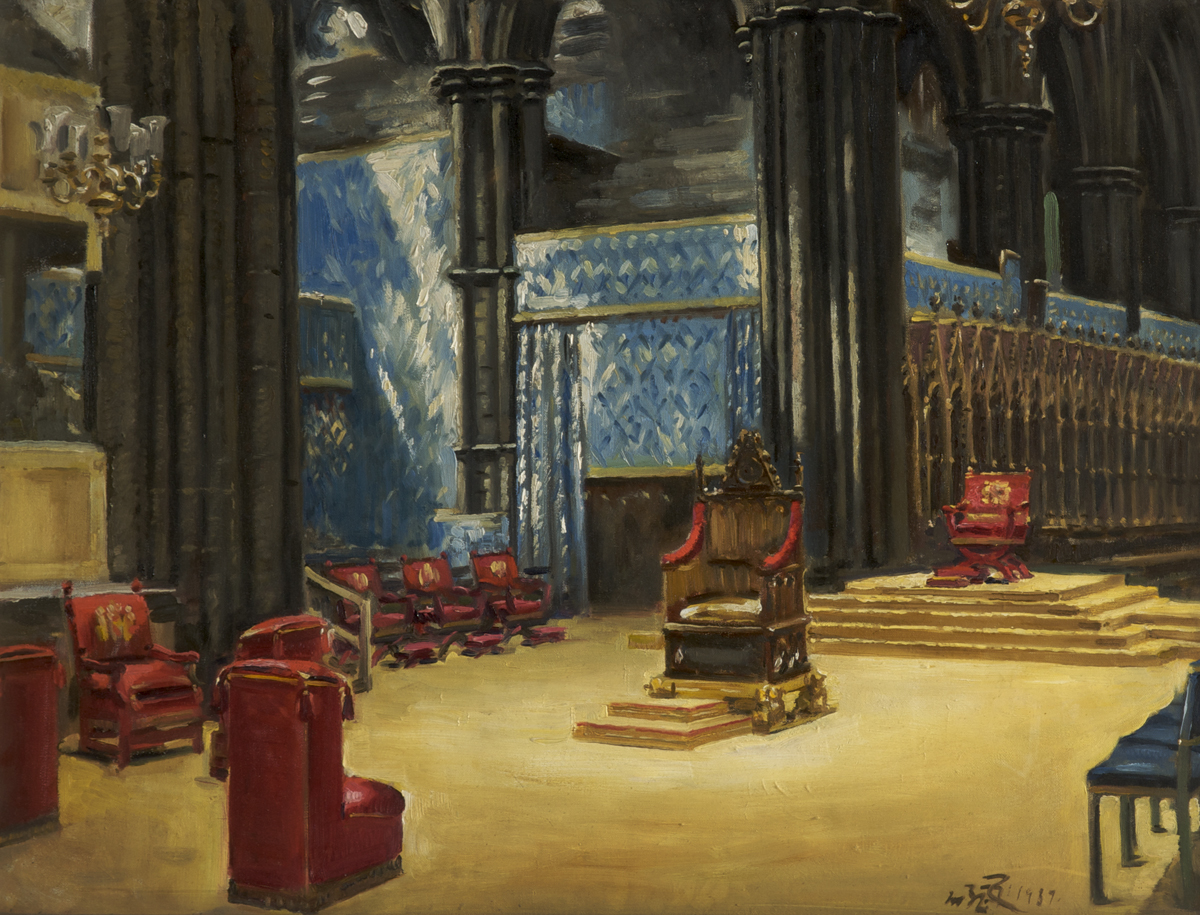
Interior of Westminster Abbey, Arranged for the Coronation, 1937

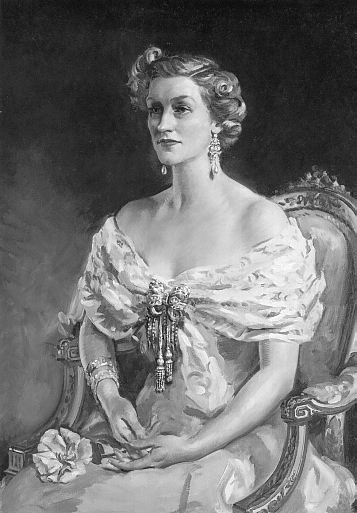
Countess William Lygon, 8th Earl Beauchamp (Else "Mona" Schiwe), ca 1938

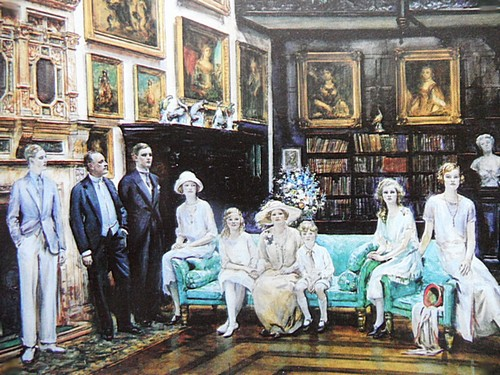
William Lygon, 7th Earl Beauchamp and Countess Beauchamp with their Family at Madresfield on the occasion of Viscount Elmley’s coming of agec. 1925

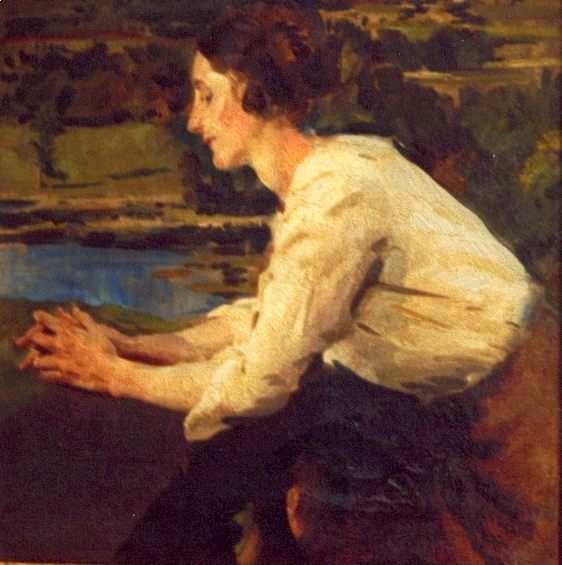
Woman on a Balcony, 1915

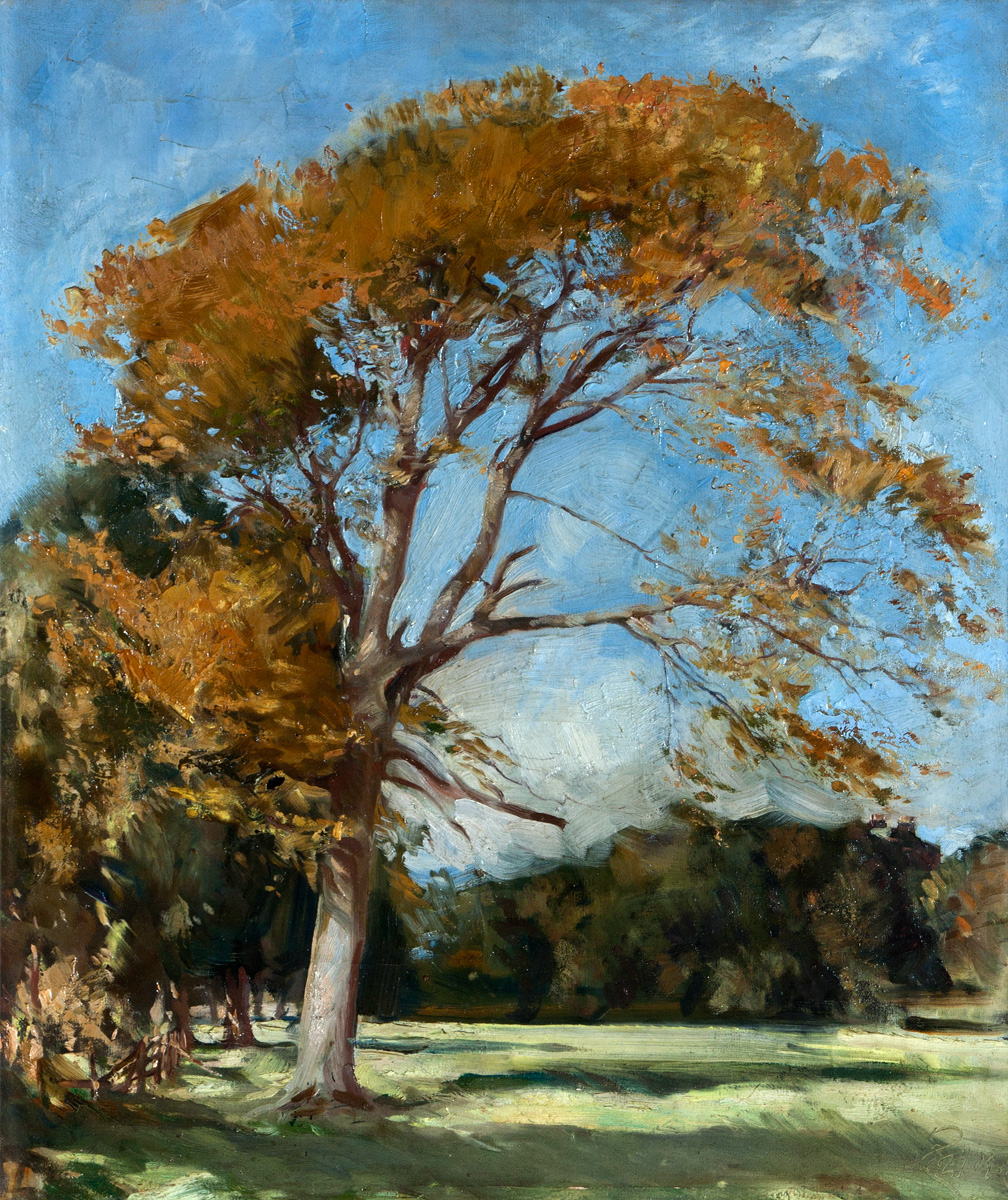
The Yellow Tree

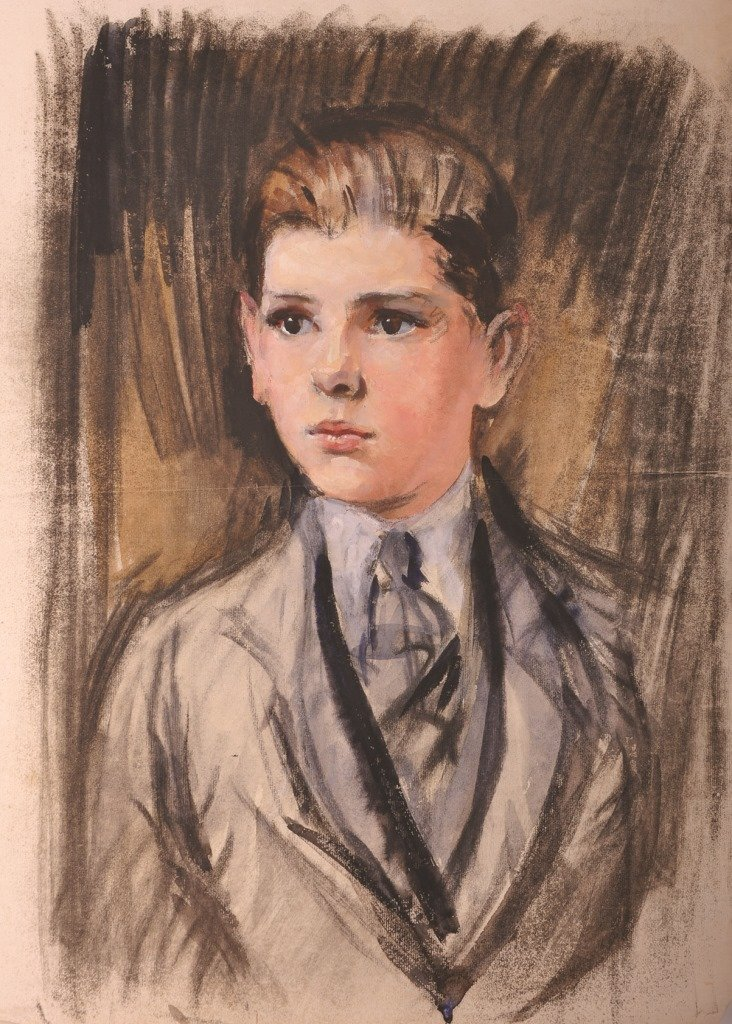
Portrait of a Young Boy

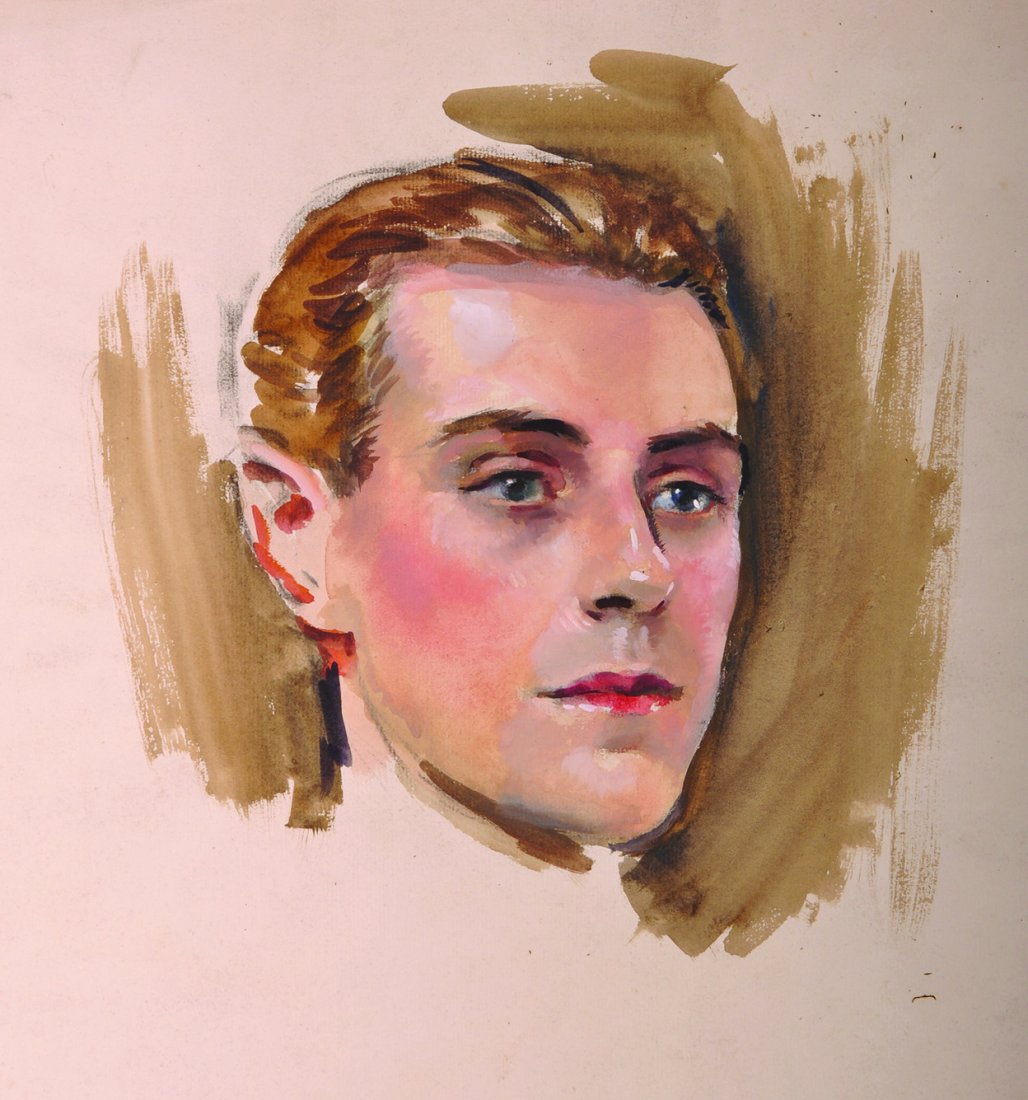
Portrait of a Young Boy

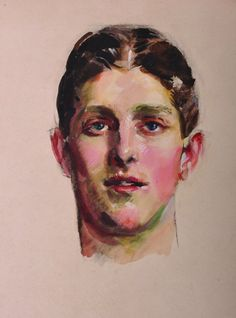
Portrait of a Young Boy

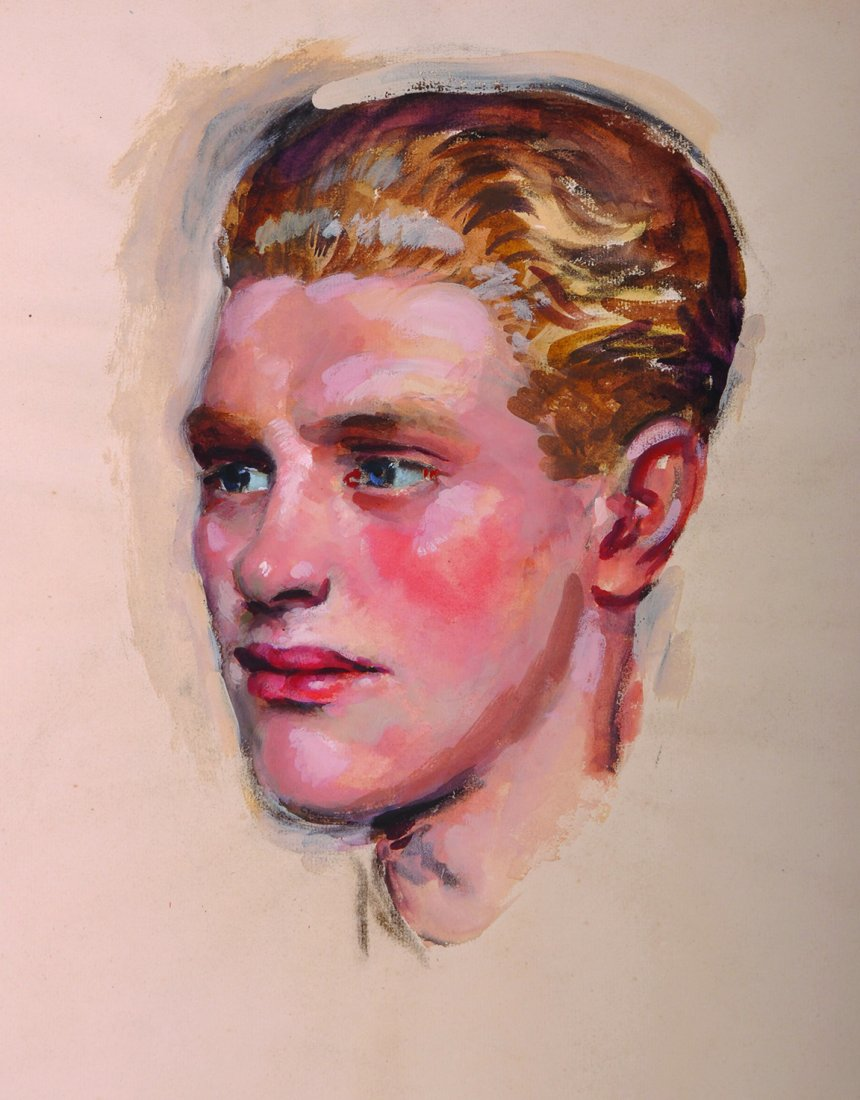
Portrait of a Young Boy

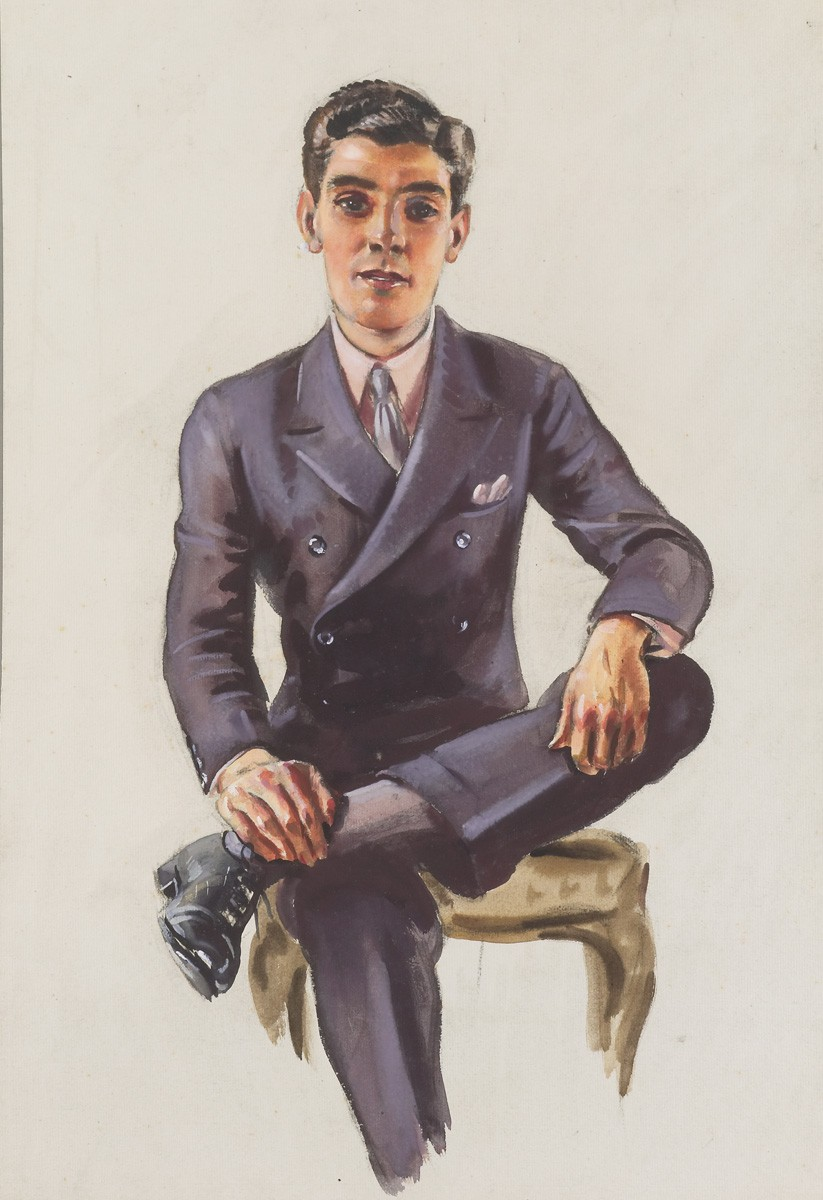
Portrait of a Young Man

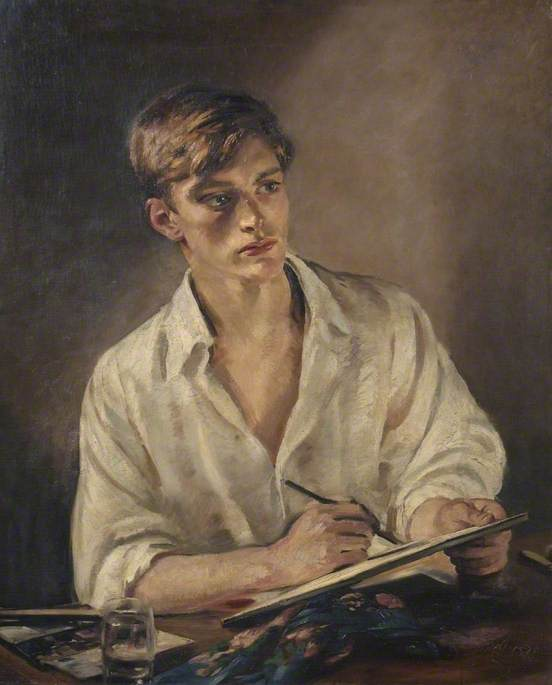
Young Man Sketching, 1920s

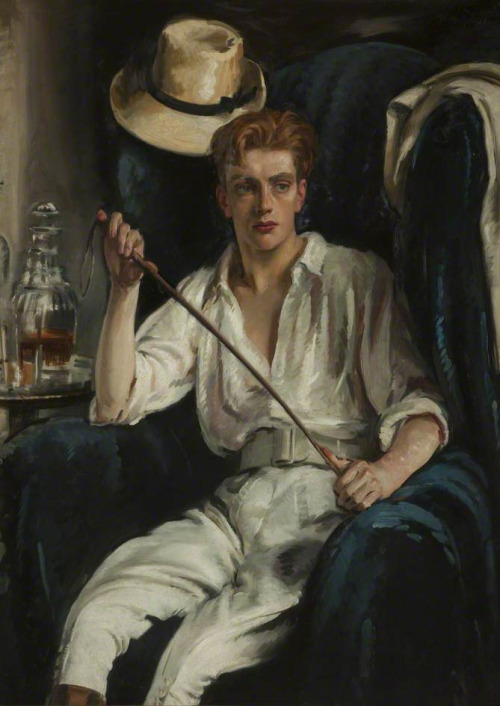
The Young Polo Player, 1920
