= Charles Mendl =

British diplomat

Sir Charles Mendl
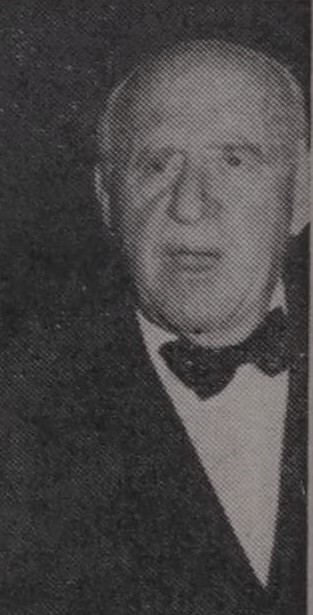
- Mendl in 1949
- Born: Charles Simon Mendl; 14 December 1871; London, England
- Died: 15 February 1958 (aged 86)
- Occupation: Diplomat
- Spouses: Elsie de Wolfe (m. 1926; died 1950); Yvonne Steinbach (m. 1951; died 1956)

Sir Charles Simon Mendl (14 December 1871 – 15 February 1958) was a British diplomat and actor who has been described as "one of the most colourful figures in the diplomatic and social life of Paris".

== Early life ==
Mendl was born in London in 1871, the second son of Jewish Czech-born Ferdinand Mendl and Jeanette Rachel; their firstborn son was Sigismund Mendl. He was educated at Harrow School, after which he started a branch of his father's grain importing business in Buenos Aires.

In 1912, he worked in Paris for a group of South American railway companies as a financial agent, having worked in South America as a railway director.

He served as an intelligence officer in the 25th Infantry Brigade during the First World War and left after he sustained serious injury due to a horse falling on him in 1915.

== Diplomatic career ==
He worked in Paris for Admiralty intelligence in 1918, when he was attached to the British embassy during the Paris Peace Conference.

Mendl was made a Knight Bachelor in the 1924 Birthday Honours for "services to HM Embassy in Paris", allegedly due to his retrieval of letters from a gigolo who had been blackmailing Prince George, Duke of Kent. The French believed that it was for services relating to spying. President of the Council of Ministers Pierre Laval believed Mendl was working for British intelligence, blaming him for leaking the Hoare–Laval Pact that would have given much of Ethiopia to fascist Italy. Mendl had received part of his 1922 salary from secret service funds.

His connections meant that he was able to invite the socialist Léon Blum to the embassy after his 1936 election, whilst the ambassador George Clerk hadn't met him. Mendl, along with then ambassador Eric Phipps, supported appeasement, playing down Winston Churchill's importance in March 1938 and trying to prevent Anthony Eden from speaking in Paris in June 1939.

== Personal life ==
Mendl married interior decorator Elsie de Wolfe in 1926, at which point he was head of the press section in the British embassy in Paris, with the wedding held at the British consulate in Paris. De Wolfe was living in a lesbian relationship with Elisabeth Marbury, and the marriage allowed her to use the title "Lady". De Wolfe paid Mendl a monthly allowance, and the two did not live together.

He was an amateur baritone singer, taught by Jean de Reszke.

At the Nazi occupation of France in 1940, Mendl was forced to leave for the United States, living in Beverly Hills. Mendl appeared in Alfred Hitchcock's 1946 film Notorious in the role of Commodore who meets Ingrid Bergman's character at a party. In 1947, Mendl hosted a television programme called The Sir Charles Mendl Show.

He returned to France after the end of the Second World War. After de Wolfe's death in 1950, Mendl married Yvonne Steinbach, who died in 1956.

== Filmography ==
Year	Title	Role	Notes
1946	Notorious	Commodore	
1947	Ivy	Sir Charles Gage	Uncredited, (final film role)
