= Thomas O'Donnell (Irish nationalist politician) =

Irish politician

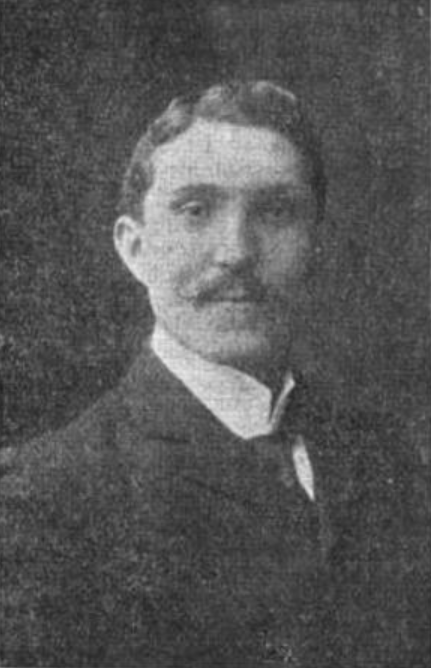

Member of Parliament for West Kerry
- In office 24 October 1900 – 14 December 1918
- Preceded by: Thomas Esmonde
- Succeeded by: Austin Stack

Personal details
- Born: 30 November 1871 Liscarney, Dingle, County Kerry, Ireland
- Died: 11 June 1943 (aged 71)
- Party: United Irish League
- Spouse: Nora Ryan (m. 1897)
- Children: 10
- Education: Marlborough Street Training College; Royal University of Ireland; King's Inns

Thomas O'Donnell (30 November 1871 – 11 June 1943) was an Irish nationalist politician of the Irish Parliamentary Party who served as member of parliament (MP) for West Kerry from 1900 to 1918 representing the constituency in the House of Commons of the United Kingdom of Great Britain and Ireland. He was an active promoter of agrarian reform, M.A. (R.U.I.), teacher, lawyer, chairman of the Tralee and Dingle Railway and later a prominent Irish Judge.

== Early life ==
He was the second eldest son of four sons and five daughters of Michael O'Donnell and Ellen Rohan, he came from an Irish-speaking family in Liscarney, Dingle, on the Dingle Peninsula, but his family were evicted during the Irish Land League's Land War in 1880, and lived in a small cabin for the next seven years. He became a national teacher after qualifying in Marlborough Street Training College, teaching in a boys' school in Killorglin from 1892 until 1900.

Early in life he allied himself with the Home Rule movement, while concerning himself with the land issue, and in 1898 formalised that commitment by joining with William O'Brien in the United Irish League. This organisation pursued the breaking up of large farms, and O'Donnell was to prove himself a tenacious fighter for tenant rights. Even at the end of the 20th century, his efforts at a local level are recalled.

== Political career ==
In the general election 1900, O'Donnell was returned as the MP for West Kerry. After he took his seat in Westminster, he rose on 19 February 1901 in the House and began his address in the Irish language, only to be ruled out of order. It was the first time that Irish was used in a speech in the House of Commons in London, and this rapidly made him a celebrity for the Gaelic Revival.

He was a close associate of Maurice Moynihan (died 1915), leader of the Irish Republican Brotherhood in Kerry, as well as founder of the Gaelic Athletic Association club in Kerry in 1885, father of Maurice Gerard Moynihan, and in 1900 chairman of O'Donnell's election campaign committee. O'Donnell was involved with the Gaelic League from 1893 and was instrumental in having the Irish Party force a debate in the House of Commons on the use of Irish in national schools. Despite his roots, he wasn't a fervent nationalist and shunned the Fenian tendencies of many of his more strident contemporaries.

O'Donnell studied in King's Inns and was called to the bar of Ireland in 1905, and practised as a barrister for many years. He became a staunch follower of John Redmond as well as his party's Home Rule movement, but despite some flirtations with separatism and with William O'Brien he was seen as one of the Irish Party's rising stars, and possible member of a home rule government. Even before the outbreak of World War I he was a passionate supporter of Redmond's Irish Volunteers, then to become a vigorous promoter of recruitment for Irish regiments. As a member of the Irish recruiting council during 1914–1918 he was criticised for not joining himself, but had a large family.

== Second career ==
He was bitterly opposed to Sinn Féin, later after the founding of the Irish Free State he attacked W. T. Cosgrave and his Cumann na nGaedheal government as well. O'Donnell then co-founded the National League Party with William Redmond, its aim to unite the country peacefully after the Civil War. Following the June 1927 Irish general election in which the party returned eight deputies (O'Donnell was not returned), the party along with the Fianna Fáil and Labour parties, planned to replace the Cumann na nGaedheal government, but were foiled by their deputy John Jinks being absent for the crucial vote. When the National League Party finally dissolved in 1931, O'Donnell joined Fianna Fáil and became one of their chief advisors and a tireless campaigner for the party (standing unsuccessfully as a candidate in the 1932 general election). Éamon de Valera frequently consulted him.

He was called to the inner bar in 1932, and was appointed judge in the Circuit Court for Counties Clare, Kerry and Limerick in 1941.

He married Nora Ryan on 26 January 1897. They had ten children. Dermot Kinlen was a grandson of O'Donnell.

Parliament of the United Kingdom
Preceded by Sir Thomas Esmonde	Member of Parliament for West Kerry; 1900 – 1918	Succeeded by Austin Stack
