= West Kerry =

West Kerry or Kerry West may refer to:

- The western part of County Kerry, in Ireland
- West Kerry GAA
- West Kerry (UK Parliament constituency)
