= Sir Osmond Esmonde, 12th Baronet =

Irish diplomat and politician (1896–1936)

Sir Osmond Esmonde
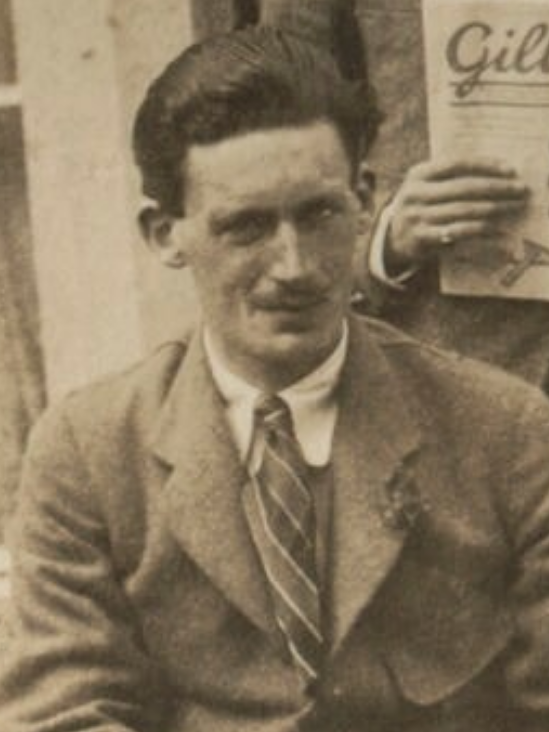
- Esmonde in 1919

Teachta Dála
- In office September 1927 – 22 July 1936
- In office August 1923 – June 1927
- Constituency: Wexford

Personal details
- Born: 4 April 1896 County Wexford, Ireland
- Died: 22 July 1936 (aged 40) County Wexford, Ireland
- Party: Sinn Féin; Cumann na nGaedheal; Fine Gael; National Group
- Relatives: Sir Thomas Esmonde (father)
- Education: Balliol College (attended); University College Dublin (attended)

Sir Osmond Thomas Grattan Esmonde, 12th Baronet (4 April 1896 – 22 July 1936) was an Irish diplomat and Cumann na nGaedheal (and later Fine Gael) politician.

== Early life ==
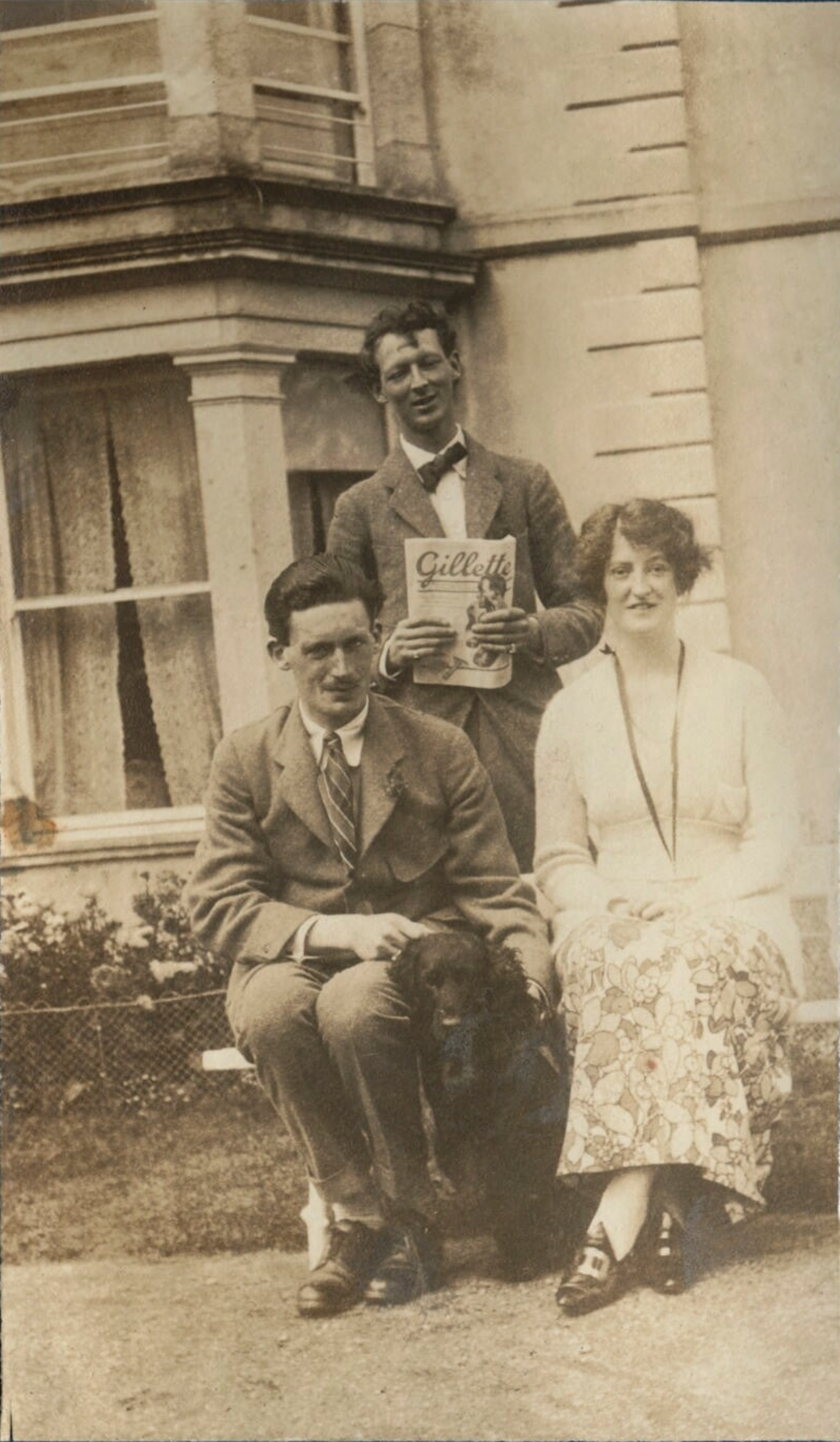
Esmonde alongside friends Lois Sturt and Evan Morgan, 2nd Viscount Tredegar in 1919

He was born in Ballynastragh, Gorey, County Wexford in 1896, the eldest son of Sir Thomas Esmonde. He was educated at Mount St Benedict School in Gorey; and the Downside School. He attended Balliol College, Oxford and University College Dublin, though he did not graduate from either.

== Politics ==
After the 1916 Easter Rising, he joined Sinn Féin and campaigned at the 1918 general election for Roger Sweetman in North Wexford, even though his father was the sitting MP and Irish Parliamentary Party candidate. Thereafter Esmonde contributed to the Irish War of Independence by acting a diplomat for the new Sinn Féin shadow government. After a period in London assisting Arthur O'Brien, Esmonde joined Éamon de Valera in the United States where they sought recognition for the Irish Republic and resources to fund it. In late 1920 Esmonde was dispatched to try and gain recognition for Ireland from members of the British Commonwealth.

=== Tour of the Commonwealth ===
First travelling from New York City to Vancouver, Esmonde departed for New Zealand and Australia abroad "the Makura". Following a brief shore leave in Hawaii where Esmonde met the Irish-American governor of the islands Charles J. McCarthy in Honolulu, the Makura arrived in New Zealand in January 1921. However, the British had made contact with New Zealand authorities and had ordered that Esmonde not be allowed to land in the country. Blocked from New Zealand, the Makura continued onwards towards Sydney, Australia. There also the British had made arrangements to block Esmonde; under the "War Precautions Repeal Act 1920" Australia was granted the power to block any British citizen from entering the country without first agreeing to swear an oath of allegiance to the British monarchy. Esmonde refused to swear the oath and was held to the Makura. The situation caused controversy in Australia and was reported on from as far away as New York. Compounding Esmonde's issues was a labour strike being held concurrently, one that would see Esmonde and the Makura held in Sydney's docks for over six weeks.

The Makura left Sydney in March 1921 and attempted to return to New Zealand, but initially was once again blocked. However, this time Esmonde was aided by Irish members of the New Zealand police force, and was able to leave the Makura and visit several locations in New Zealand.

Following an incident where he was deported from Fiji, Esmonde made his return to Vancouver, Canada on 29 March. He was detained for two days before being allowed entry, only to be arrested on 4 April on charges of sedition. Esmonde was placed on trial not once but twice in Canada, but in the second case the Judge, while finding him guilty, refused to sentence him. Esmonde returned to Ireland in the summer of 1921.

=== Further diplomatic work ===
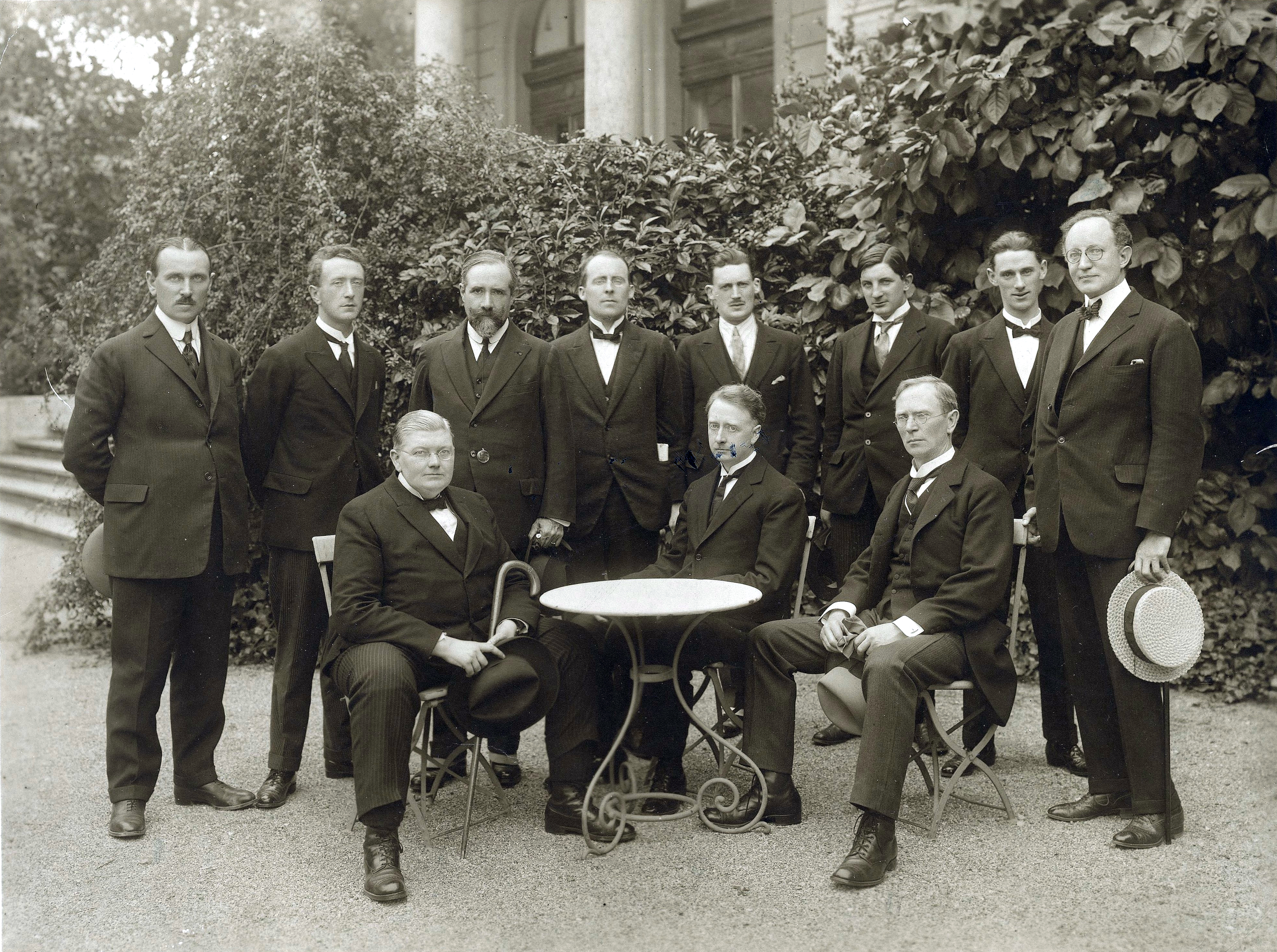
Esmonde as part of the Irish delegation to the League of Nations in Geneva. Esmonde is in the centre of the back row, behind W.T. Cosgrave

After the signing of the Anglo-Irish treaty in December 1921, Esmonde was sent to Paris, France to aid Seán T. O'Kelly. While there, Esmonde attended the Irish Race Convention of 1922. Later in 1922 he was deployed to Spain before being recalled to Dublin in 1923, where he became assistant secretary at the Department of External Affairs. On 26 August 1923, one day before the 1923 Irish general election, Esmonde departed for Geneva, Switzerland as part of the Irish delegation to the League of Nations.

=== As a TD ===
While abroad Esmonde was elected as a Cumann na nGaedheal TD for Wexford. However, just a year later he left Cumann na nGaedhael for the National Group. Unlike other National Group TDs, Esmonde did not resign his seat. Esmonde rejoined Cumann na nGaedhael in early 1927 but did not contest the June 1927 general election.

Esmonde time away from the Dáil was extremely brief however, as he was returned to the 6th Dáil in the September 1927 general election. He was re-elected at the 1932 general election, and again at the 1933 general election. During his time in the Dáil, Esmonde's speeches were not noted for their eloquence but for their wit and frankness.

By 1933 Esmonde had become part of the Army Comrades Association paramilitary organisation (better known as the Blueshirts), which had merged with Cumann na nGaedheal in September 1933 to become Fine Gael. Esmonde was amongst a small number of Fine Gael TDs who wore the Blueshirt uniform into the Seanad, a manoeuvre which resulted in the banning of political uniforms from the Oireachtas.

In November 1935, following the outbreak of the Second Italo-Ethiopian War, Esmonde proclaimed that he thought Benito Mussolini was the "Abraham Lincoln of Africa", whose mission was to "abolish the slave trade in spite of the sentimental sympathy of Great Britain".

== Personal life ==
Esmonde did not enjoy a good relationship with his father, Thomas Esmonde. His father died in 1935 and left his entire estate to his second wife Anna Frances Levins rather than Osmond, his only surviving son (a brother John had been killed in the Battle of Jutland during World War I). In 1936, just weeks before his own death, Osmond Esmonde attempted to have a court overturn the will, claiming that the deaths of his brother and mother as well as the burning of the family's traditional home of Ballynastragh House in 1923 by the Anti-Treaty IRA had driven his father insane. The court still found in favour of his stepmother, although Esmonde reportedly took the result in stride.

In his non-political life, Esmonde was interested in soccer, archery, and aviation. At one point Esmonde was both President of the Football Association of Ireland and the Leinster Football Association and highly involved in ensuring the Irish national team were able to play in international matches. Esmonde was also vice-president of the Irish Aero Club and flew his own plane. During the 1932 general election, Esmonde used his plane to drop election material to voters.

== Death ==
After his death aged 40 on 22 July 1936, the consequent by-election for his seat in Dáil Éireann was held on 17 August, and won by the Fianna Fáil candidate Denis Allen.

Esmonde never married and was succeeded in the baronetcy by his uncle Laurence Esmonde.

== See also ==
- Families in the Oireachtas

Baronetage of Ireland
Preceded by Thomas Esmonde	Baronet (of Ballynastragh); 1935–1936	Succeeded by Laurence Esmonde

Dáil	Election	Deputy (Party)	Deputy (Party)	Deputy (Party)	Deputy (Party)	Deputy (Party)
2nd	1921	Richard Corish (SF)	James Ryan (SF)	Séamus Doyle (SF)	Seán Etchingham (SF)	4 seats 1921–1923
3rd	1922	Richard Corish (Lab)	Daniel O'Callaghan (Lab)	Séamus Doyle (AT-SF)	Michael Doyle (FP)	4 seats 1921–1923
4th	1923	Richard Corish (Lab)	James Ryan (Rep)	Robert Lambert (Rep)	Michael Doyle (FP)	Osmond Esmonde (CnaG)
5th	1927 (Jun)	Richard Corish (Lab)	James Ryan (FF)	James Shannon (Lab)	Michael Doyle (FP)	John Keating (NL)
6th	1927 (Sep)	Richard Corish (Lab)	James Ryan (FF)	Denis Allen (FF)	Michael Jordan (FP)	Osmond Esmonde (CnaG)
7th	1932	Richard Corish (Lab)	James Ryan (FF)	Denis Allen (FF)	John Keating (CnaG)	Osmond Esmonde (CnaG)
8th	1933	Richard Corish (Lab)	James Ryan (FF)	Patrick Kehoe (FF)	John Keating (CnaG)	Osmond Esmonde (CnaG)
8th	1936 by-election	Richard Corish (Lab)	James Ryan (FF)	Patrick Kehoe (FF)	John Keating (CnaG)	Denis Allen (FF)
9th	1937	Richard Corish (Lab)	James Ryan (FF)	John Keating (FG)	John Esmonde (FG)	Denis Allen (FF)
10th	1938	Richard Corish (Lab)	James Ryan (FF)	John Keating (FG)	John Esmonde (FG)	Denis Allen (FF)
11th	1943	Richard Corish (Lab)	James Ryan (FF)	John O'Leary (Lab)	John Esmonde (FG)	Denis Allen (FF)
12th	1944	Richard Corish (Lab)	James Ryan (FF)	John O'Leary (NLP)	John Keating (FG)	Denis Allen (FF)
12th	1945 by-election	Brendan Corish (Lab)	James Ryan (FF)	John O'Leary (NLP)	John Keating (FG)	Denis Allen (FF)
13th	1948	Brendan Corish (Lab)	James Ryan (FF)	John O'Leary (NLP)	John Esmonde (FG)	Denis Allen (FF)
14th	1951	Brendan Corish (Lab)	James Ryan (FF)	John O'Leary (Lab)	Anthony Esmonde (FG)	Denis Allen (FF)
15th	1954	Brendan Corish (Lab)	James Ryan (FF)	John O'Leary (Lab)	Anthony Esmonde (FG)	Denis Allen (FF)
16th	1957	Brendan Corish (Lab)	James Ryan (FF)	Seán Browne (FF)	Anthony Esmonde (FG)	Denis Allen (FF)
17th	1961	Brendan Corish (Lab)	James Ryan (FF)	Lorcan Allen (FF)	Anthony Esmonde (FG)	4 seats 1961–1981
18th	1965	Brendan Corish (Lab)	James Kennedy (FF)	Lorcan Allen (FF)	Anthony Esmonde (FG)	4 seats 1961–1981
19th	1969	Brendan Corish (Lab)	Seán Browne (FF)	Lorcan Allen (FF)	Anthony Esmonde (FG)	4 seats 1961–1981
20th	1973	Brendan Corish (Lab)	Seán Browne (FF)	Lorcan Allen (FF)	John Esmonde (FG)	4 seats 1961–1981
21st	1977	Brendan Corish (Lab)	Seán Browne (FF)	Lorcan Allen (FF)	Michael D'Arcy (FG)	4 seats 1961–1981
22nd	1981	Brendan Corish (Lab)	Ivan Yates (FG)	Lorcan Allen (FF)	Michael D'Arcy (FG)	Hugh Byrne (FF)
23rd	1982 (Feb)	Seán Browne (FF)	Ivan Yates (FG)	Lorcan Allen (FF)	Michael D'Arcy (FG)	Hugh Byrne (FF)
24th	1982 (Nov)	Avril Doyle (FG)	Ivan Yates (FG)	John Browne (FF)	Michael D'Arcy (FG)	Hugh Byrne (FF)
25th	1987	Avril Doyle (FG)	Ivan Yates (FG)	John Browne (FF)	Brendan Howlin (Lab)	Hugh Byrne (FF)
26th	1989	Michael D'Arcy (FG)	Ivan Yates (FG)	John Browne (FF)	Brendan Howlin (Lab)	Séamus Cullimore (FF)
27th	1992	Avril Doyle (FG)	Ivan Yates (FG)	John Browne (FF)	Brendan Howlin (Lab)	Hugh Byrne (FF)
28th	1997	Michael D'Arcy (FG)	Ivan Yates (FG)	John Browne (FF)	Brendan Howlin (Lab)	Hugh Byrne (FF)
29th	2002	Paul Kehoe (FG)	Liam Twomey (Ind.)	John Browne (FF)	Brendan Howlin (Lab)	Tony Dempsey (FF)
30th	2007	Paul Kehoe (FG)	Michael W. D'Arcy (FG)	John Browne (FF)	Brendan Howlin (Lab)	Seán Connick (FF)
31st	2011	Paul Kehoe (FG)	Liam Twomey (FG)	John Browne (FF)	Brendan Howlin (Lab)	Mick Wallace (Ind.)
32nd	2016	Paul Kehoe (FG)	Michael W. D'Arcy (FG)	James Browne (FF)	Brendan Howlin (Lab)	Mick Wallace (I4C)
32nd	2019 by-election	Paul Kehoe (FG)	Michael W. D'Arcy (FG)	James Browne (FF)	Brendan Howlin (Lab)	Malcolm Byrne (FF)
33rd	2020	Paul Kehoe (FG)	Verona Murphy (Ind.)	James Browne (FF)	Brendan Howlin (Lab)	Johnny Mythen (SF)
34th	2024	4 seats since 2024	Verona Murphy (Ind.)	James Browne (FF)	George Lawlor (Lab)	Johnny Mythen (SF)
