= Elsie de Wolfe =

American interior decorator, author, and actress

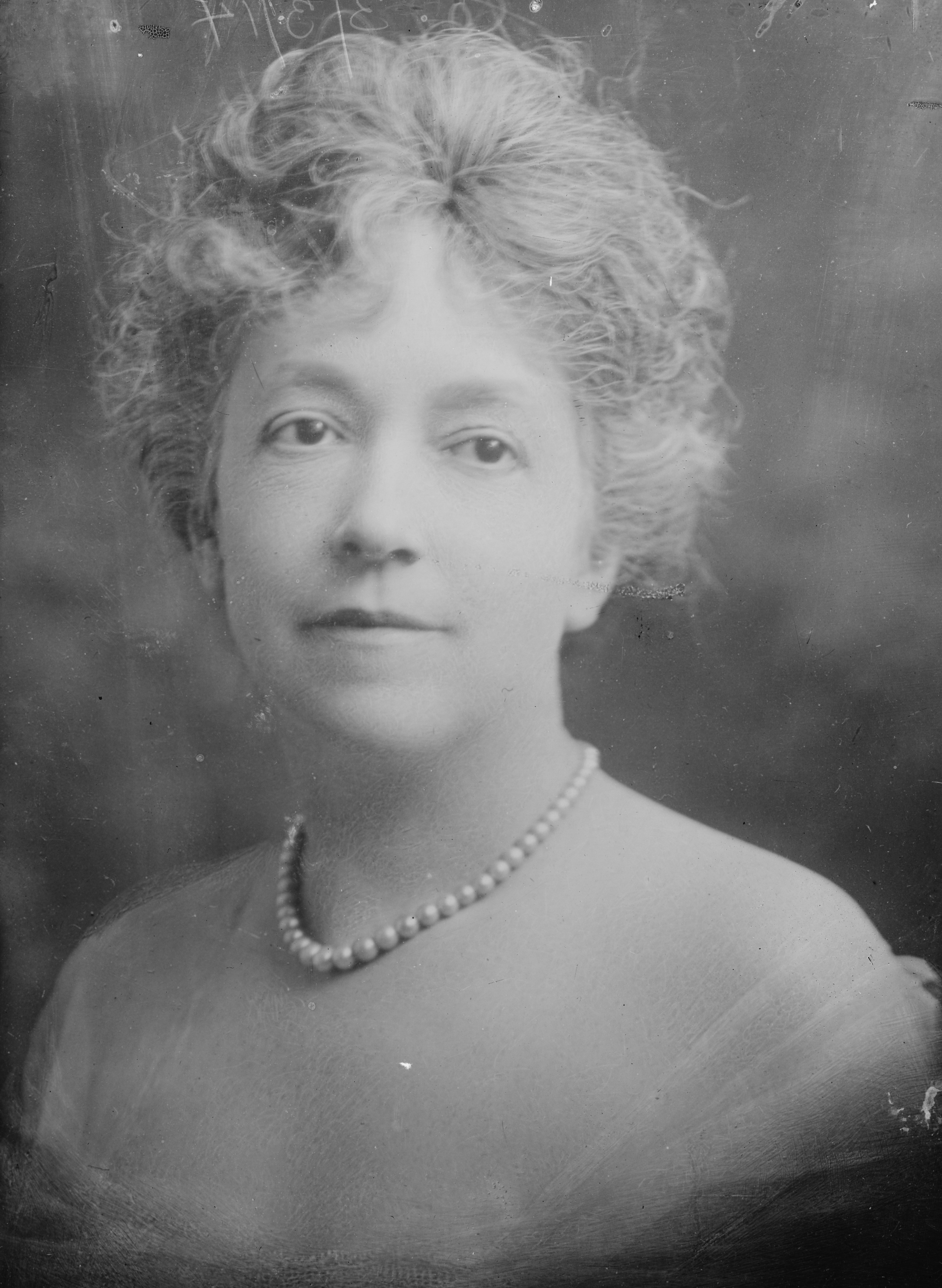
- Elsie de Wolfe, 1914
- Born: Ella Anderson de Wolfe; December 20, c. 1859; New York City, U.S.
- Died: July 12, 1950 (aged 90); Versailles, France
- Occupations: Actress; interior decorator; author
- Title: Lady Mendl
- Spouse: Sir Charles Mendl (m. 1926)
- Partner: Elisabeth Marbury

Signature
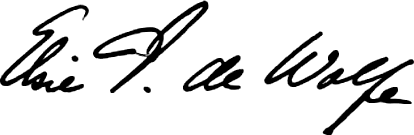

Elsie de Wolfe, Lady Mendl (born Ella Anderson de Wolfe; December 20, 1865 – July 12, 1950) was an American actress who became a prominent interior designer and author. Born in New York City, de Wolfe was acutely sensitive to her surroundings from her earliest years and became one of the first female interior decorators, replacing dark and ornate Victorian decor with lighter, simpler styles and uncluttered room layouts.

Her 1926 marriage to English diplomat Sir Charles Mendl was seen as a marriage of convenience, although she was proud to be called Lady Mendl. Since 1892, de Wolfe had been living openly in a lesbian relationship with Elisabeth Marbury, with whom she lived in New York and Paris. Lady Mendl was a prominent social figure, and she entertained in the most distinguished circles.

== Career ==
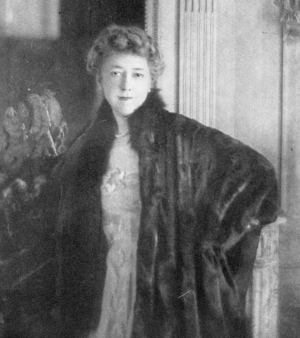
Elsie de Wolfe, photograph from The House in Good Taste, 1913

According to The New Yorker, "Interior design as a profession was invented by Elsie de Wolfe". She was certainly the most famous name in the field until the 1930s, but the profession of interior decorator/designer was recognized as a promising one as early as 1900, five years before she received her first official commission, the Colony Club in New York. During her married life (from 1926 until her death in 1950), the press often referred to her as Lady Mendl.

Among de Wolfe's distinguished clients were Anne Harriman Vanderbilt, Anne Morgan, the Duke and Duchess of Windsor, and Henry Clay and Adelaide Frick. She transformed the interiors of wealthy clients' homes from dark wood, heavily curtained palaces into light, intimate spaces featuring fresh colors and a reliance on 18th-century French furniture and accessories. She was nominal author of the influential 1913 book The House in Good Taste.

A room designed by Elsie de Wolfe (color photograph from The House in Good Taste, 1913)

In her autobiography, de Wolfe – born Ella Anderson de Wolfe and the only daughter of a Canadian-born doctor – called herself a "rebel in an ugly world." Her sensitivity to style and color was acute from childhood. Arriving home from school one day, she found her parents had redecorated the drawing room:

"She ran [in] ... and looked at the walls, which had been papered in a [William] Morris design of gray palm-leaves and splotches of bright red and green on a background of dull tan. Something terrible that cut like a knife came up inside her. She threw herself on the floor, kicking with stiffened legs, as she beat her hands on the carpet.... She cried out, over and over: ‘It's so ugly! It's so ugly.’"

Hutton Wilkinson, president of the Elsie de Wolfe Foundation, clarified that many things de Wolfe hated, such as "pickle and plum Morris furniture," are prized today by museums and designers. "De Wolfe simply didn't like Victorian, the high style of her sad childhood," Wilkinson wrote, "and chose to banish it from her design vocabulary."

De Wolfe's first career choice was that of actress. She originally appeared with the Amateur Comedy Club in New York City as Lady Clara Seymour in A Cup of Tea (April 1886) and as Maude Ashley in Sunshine (December 1886), a one-act comedy by Fred W. Broughton. Her success led to a full-time theatrical career, making her professional debut in Sardou's Thermidor in 1891, in which she played the role of Fabienne with Forbes-Robertson.

In 1894, she joined the Empire Stock Company under Charles Frohman. In 1901 she brought out The Way of the World under her own management at the Victoria Theatre, and later toured the United States in the role. On stage, she was neither a total failure nor a great success; one critic called her "the leading exponent of the peculiar art of wearing good clothes well." She became interested in interior decorating as a result of staging plays, and in 1903 she left the theater to launch a career as a decorator.

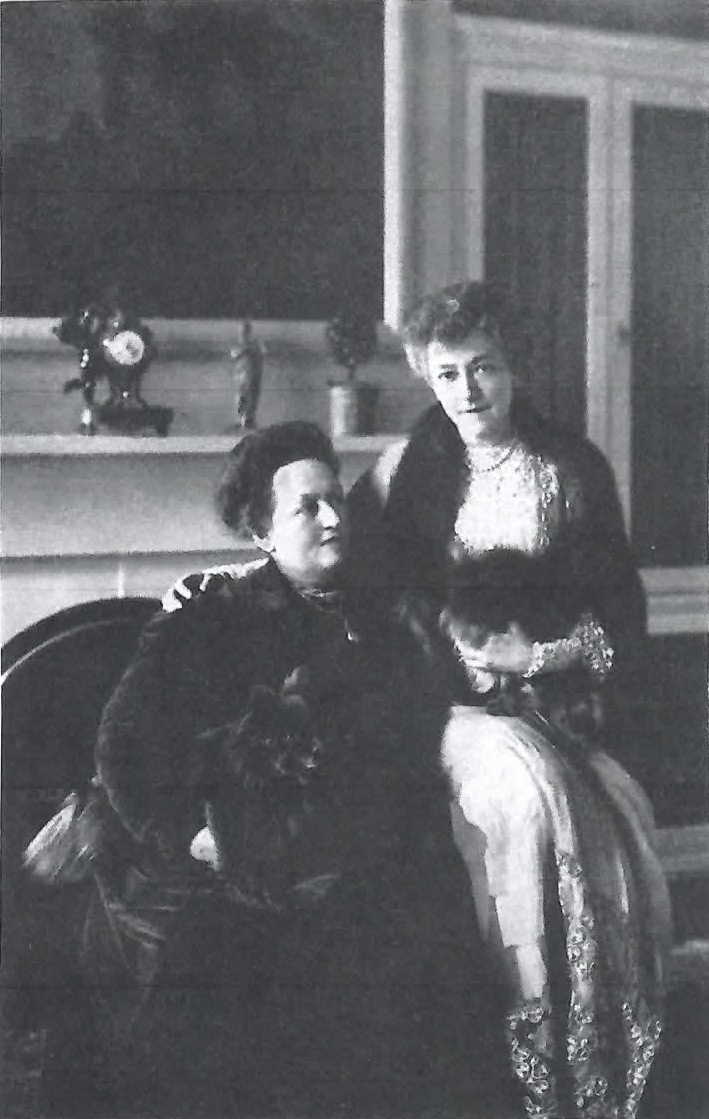
Bessie Marbury and Elsie de Wolfe (from My Crystal Ball, 1923)

Many elements aided her in becoming such an influential figure in the emerging field — her social connections, her reputation as an actress and her success in decorating the interior of the Irving House, the residence she shared with her close friend and lover, Elisabeth "Bessie" Marbury.

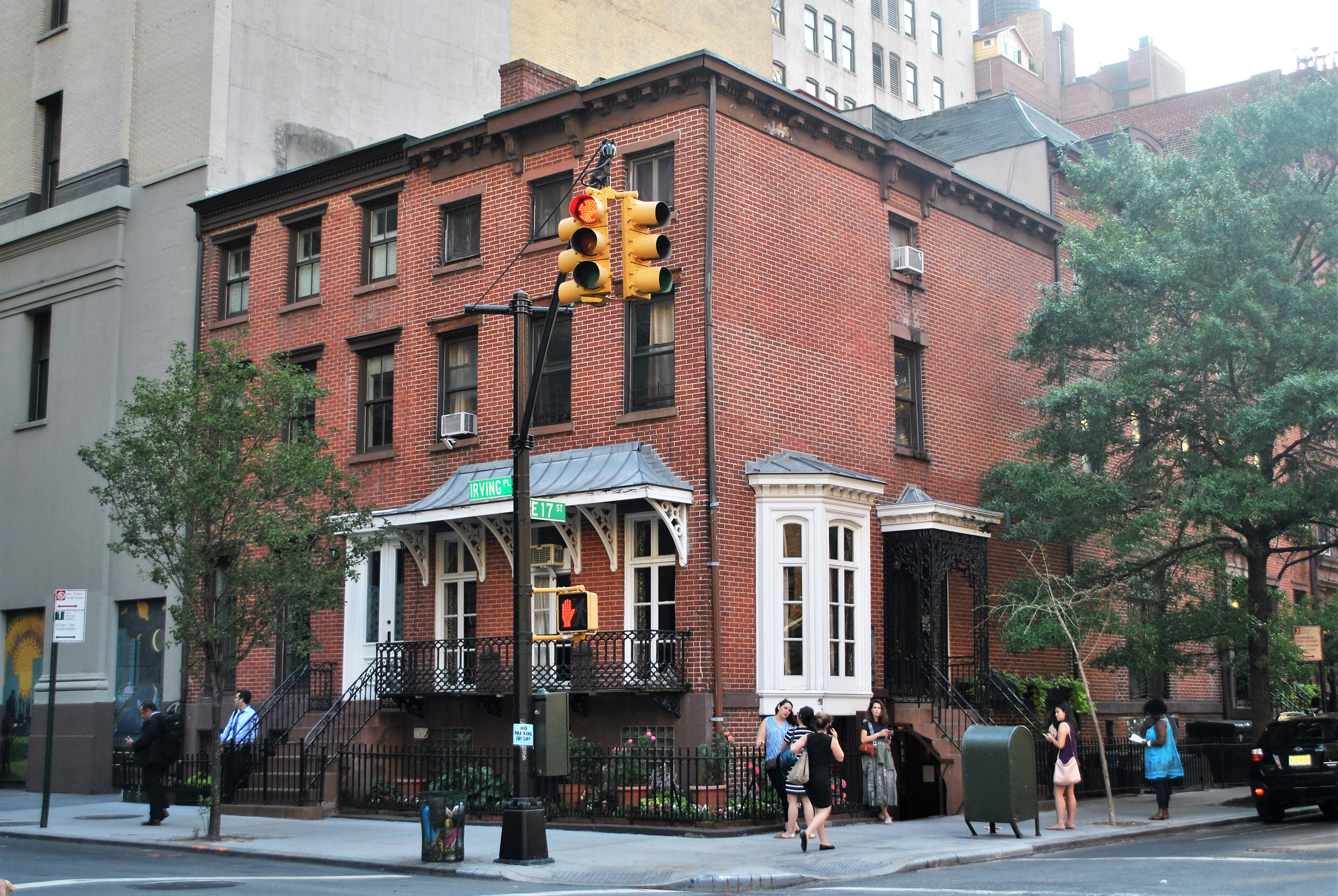
Irving House, New York City, New York

Preferring a brighter scheme of decorating than was fashionable in Victorian times, she helped convert interiors featuring dark, heavy draperies and overly ornate furnishings into light, soft, more feminine rooms. She made a feature of mirrors, which both illuminated and expanded living spaces, brought back into fashion furniture painted in white or pale colors, and indulged her taste for chinoiserie, chintz, green and white stripes, wicker, trompe-l'œil effects in wallpaper, and trelliswork motifs, suggesting the allure of the garden. As de Wolfe claimed: "I opened the doors and windows of America, and let the air and sunshine in." Her inspiration came from 18th-century French and English art, literature, theater, and fashion.

In 1905, Stanford White, the architect for the Colony Club and a longtime friend, helped de Wolfe secure the commission for its interior design. The building, located at 120 Madison Avenue (near 30th Street), would become the premier women's social club on its opening two years later, much of its appeal owing to the interiors de Wolfe arranged. Instead of the heavy, masculine overtones then pervasive in fashionable interiors, de Wolfe used light fabric for window coverings, painted walls pale colors, tiled the floors, and added wicker chairs and settees. The effect centered on the illusion of an outdoor garden pavilion. (The building is now occupied by the American Academy of Dramatic Arts.) The success of the Colony Club proved a turning point in her own life and career, launching her fame as the most sought-after interior decorator of the day.

Over the course of the next six years, de Wolfe designed interiors for many prestigious private homes, clubs, and businesses on both the East and West coasts. By 1913, her reputation had grown so that her studio took up an entire floor of offices on 5th Avenue. That year she received her greatest commission – from coal magnate Henry Clay Frick, one of the richest men in America at the time.

== Marriage and family ==
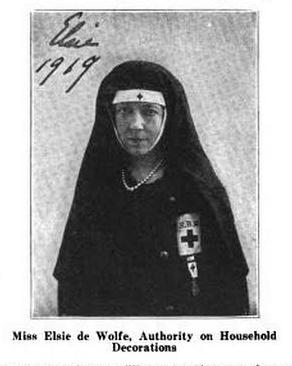
Elsie de Wolfe in Red Cross volunteer uniform, from a 1919 publication.

De Wolfe's 1926 marriage to diplomat Sir Charles Mendl, the British press attache in Paris, was page-one news in the New York Times. The marriage was platonic and one of convenience. The pair appeared to have married primarily for social amenities, entertaining together but keeping separate residences. In 1935, when de Wolfe published her autobiography, she didn't mention her husband in it. Although his career had been of no great distinction, Mendl's knighthood was allegedly bestowed due to his retrieval of letters from a gigolo who had been blackmailing Prince George, Duke of Kent.

The Times reported "the intended marriage comes as a great surprise to her friends" a veiled reference to the fact that since 1892, de Wolfe had been living with Bessie Marbury. First, the two lived at 49 Irving Place in Union Square, Manhattan, and then, 13 Sutton Place. As the paper put it: "When in New York she makes her home with Miss Elisabeth Marbury at 13 Sutton Place."

The daughter of a prosperous New York lawyer, Elisabeth ("Bessie") Marbury, like de Wolfe, was also a pioneer career woman. She was one of the first female theater agents and one of the first woman Broadway producers. Her clients included Oscar Wilde and George Bernard Shaw. During their nearly 40 years together, Marbury was initially the main support of the couple. In a 2003 book, David Von Drehle wrote of "the willowy De Wolfe and the masculine Marbury ... cutting a wide path through Manhattan society. Gossips called them "the Bachelors." Expecting nothing to change in their relationship due to her marriage to Mendl, de Wolfe remained Marbury's lover until the latter's death in 1933.

== Personal celebrity ==
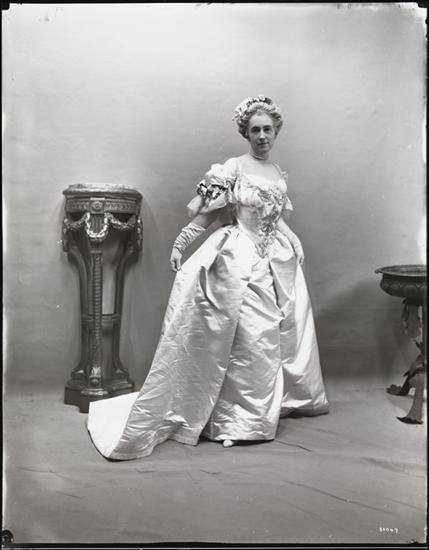
Elsie de Wolfe, James Hazen Hyde Ball, January 31, 1905

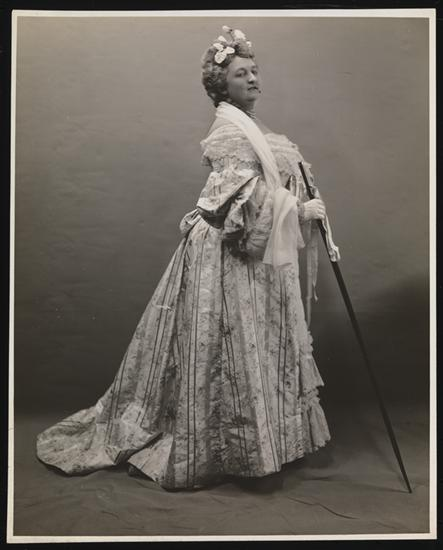
Bessie Marbury, James Hazen Hyde Ball, January 31, 1905

In 1924 de Wolfe took up an invention of her hairstylist, Monsieur Antoine (Antoni Cierplikowski), and dyed her hair blue, thus starting a new high society fad.

In 1926 The New York Times described de Wolfe as "one of the most widely known women in New York social life," and in 1935 as "prominent in Paris society."

In 1935, Paris experts named her the best-dressed woman in the world, noting that she wore what suited her best, regardless of fashion. Two days later, November 28, the Times reported that Lady Mendl, just arriving in Paris, said she did not agree and that Mrs. Reginald Fellowes (a.k.a. Daisy Fellowes) of Paris and London was the best-dressed woman anywhere. The Times reported Lady Mendl as "scoffing at the report that she spent $40,000 a year for clothes. She spends around $10,000 annually — certainly no more than $15,000 — she declared." $10,000 in 1935 dollars is roughly equivalent to $138,000 in 2005 dollars.

De Wolfe had embroidered taffeta pillows bearing the motto "Never complain, never explain." On first seeing the Parthenon, De Wolfe exclaimed "It's beige — my color!"

At her house in France, the Villa Trianon, she had a dog cemetery in which each tombstone read, "The one I loved the best."

=== Diet ===
In the early 1900s, de Wolfe promoted a semi-vegetarian diet that consisted of fresh fish, oysters, shellfish and vegetables. She described herself as an "antisarcophagist", neither a red meat eater nor wholly vegetarian. De Wolfe advocated gardening and consuming homegrown vegetables and organic food.

In her later years, de Wolfe embraced a vegetarian diet and was supervised by nutritionist Gayelord Hauser. In 1974, Hauser commented that the "fabulous Lady Mendl Elsie de Wolfe Mendl was a good friend and faithful student of nutrition, of whom I am very proud."

=== Exercise ===
Her morning exercises were famous. In her memoir, de Wolfe wrote that her daily regimen at age 70 included yoga, standing on her head, and walking on her hands. "I have a regular exercise routine founded on the Yogi method," Elsie said, "introduced to me by Anne Vanderbilt and her daughter, Princess Murat. I stand on my head [and] I can turn cart wheels. Or I walk upside-down on my hands." This facet of her life was immortalized in the title song of Cole Porter's 1934 musical, Anything Goes: "When you hear that Lady Mendl standing up/Now does a handspring landing up/on her toes/anything goes."

De Wolfe died in Versailles, France. Cremated, her ashes were placed in a common grave at Père Lachaise Cemetery in Paris.

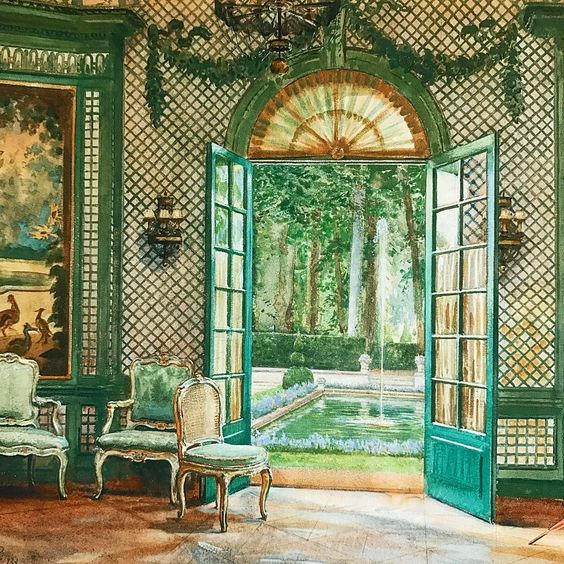
Interior of Elsie De Wolfe' music pavilion looking out on to the pool, The Villa Trianon, William Bruce Ellis Ranken

== In popular culture ==
- In Irving Berlin's "Harlem on My Mind", the singer Ethel Waters professes to prefer the "low-down" Harlem ambience to her "high-falutin' flat that Lady Mendl designed."
- One of the color schemes she popularized was the inspiration for the Cole Porter song "That Black and White Baby of Mine" (whose lyrics include the lines "All she thinks black and white/She even drinks Black & White").
- In Cole Porter's "Anything Goes," a song about modern scandals, he observes "When you hear that Lady Mendl, standing up/Now turns a handspring landing up-/On her toes/Anything goes!"
- Cole Porter also refers to her in the song Farming from the musical Let's Face It!. The lyric describes the celebrities who have gone back to nature: "Kit Cornell is shelling peas, Lady Mendl's climbing trees, Farming is so charming they all say!"
- Elsie de Wolfe is referred to as "Maid Mendl" in Osbert Sitwell's satirical and poem "Rat Week": "That gay, courageous pirate crew, With sweet Maid Mendl at the Prow, Who upon royal wings oft flew, To paint the Palace white – (and how!).
- At the opening of the novel Stella Dallas, teenage Laurel, when "dressed in one of her violet ginghams, smocked in seal-brown, with seal-brown stockings, and seal-brown shoes, and a seal-brown hat," is said to be "like an Elsie DeWolfe room in the perfection of her color scheme."

== Tributes ==
In 2015, she was named by Equality Forum as one of its 31 Icons of the 2015 LGBT History Month.

== Books ==
- The House in Good Taste. New York: The Century Company. 1913.
- Hutton Wilkinson, ed. (2004) [1913]. The House in Good Taste. Rizzoli. ISBN 0-8478-2631-7. (Reprint)
- Elsie de Wolfe's Recipes for Successful Dining. New York: D. Appleton-Century Company. 1934.
- After All. New York: Harper and Brothers. 1935.
- Charlie Scheips (2014). Elsie de Wolfe's Paris: Frivolity Before the Storm. New York: Harry N Abrams. ISBN 978-1419713897.

== See also ==
- The Decoration of Houses, a manual of interior design by Edith Wharton and Ogden Codman
- Victorian decorative arts
- Ludwig Bemelmans,To the One I Love the Best (New York: The Viking Press, 1955)
- The Great Lady Decorators: The Women Who Defined Interior Design, 1870–1955 by Adam Lewis (2010), Rizzoli, New York. ISBN 978-0-8478-3336-8
