= Edward Harrington (politician) =

Irish nationalist politician

Edward Harrington (c. 1852 – 29 May 1902) was an Irish nationalist politician, who served as the Member of Parliament (MP) for West Kerry from 1885 to 1892, taking his seat in the House of Commons of what was then the United Kingdom of Great Britain and Ireland

He was born in County Kerry, the youngest son of Dennis Harrington of Castletownbere, County Cork, and younger brother of the more prominent Timothy Harrington, also an Irish Nationalist MP. His mother was Ellen O'Sullivan. He was a barrister, though not a member of the Irish bar. He was editor and proprietor of the Kerry Sentinel, and in this role came into conflict with the authorities. In 1883 he was found guilty of posting unlawful notices, and in 1887 was sentenced to one month's imprisonment for publishing the proceedings of the Tralee branch of the National League, which had been 'proclaimed' (banned). In 1888 he was charged with publishing reports of meetings of the National League and inciting people to take part in the Plan of Campaign, and was sentenced to six months with hard labour.

He was first elected at the 1885 general election as an Irish Parliamentary Party candidate, when he won nearly 90% of the votes to defeat his only opponent, the Conservative Lt. Col. William Rowan. Harrington was returned unopposed in 1886, and when the Irish Party split in 1891, he sided with the minority Parnellite faction. At the 1892 general election, he was defeated by the Anti-Parnellite Irish National Federation candidate, Sir Thomas Esmonde. Esmonde was the outgoing MP for South Dublin, and had stood in 1892 in both constituencies; he lost his Dublin seat to a Unionist, but won in Kerry.

Parliament of the United Kingdom
New constituency	Member of Parliament for West Kerry; 1885 – 1892	Succeeded by Sir Thomas Esmonde
