= 1936 Wexford by-election =

By-election to the 8th Dáil

- 17 August 1936
- Turnout: 45,574 (79.0%)
| | Allen | Esmonde | Murphy |
| Nominee | Denis Allen | John Esmonde | Michael Murphy |
| Party | Fianna Fáil | Fine Gael | Labour |
| First preferences | 23,263 | 16,734 | 4,276 |
| Percentage | 51.0% | 36.7% | 9.4% |
| Final count | – | 16,930 | 5,100 |
TD before election
Osmond Esmonde
Fine Gael
TD after election
Denis Allen
Fianna Fáil

A Dáil by-election was held in the constituency of Wexford in the Irish Free State on Monday, 17 August 1936, to fill a vacancy in the 8th Dáil. It followed the death of Fine Gael TD Osmond Esmonde on 22 July 1936.

In 1936, Wexford was a five seat constituency comprising County Wexford. The writ of election to fill the vacancy was agreed by the Dáil on 30 July 1936. The by-election was won by the Fianna Fáil candidate Denis Allen.

The surplus votes of the elected candidate Denis Allen, were distributed after being declared elected. This was because there was a possibility another candidate could have reached the threshold of a third of a quota which would have meant their election deposit was returned to them.

It was the last by-election held in the Irish Free state, as the Constitution of Ireland came into force on 29 December 1937, and the state became Ireland. The runner-up John Esmonde of Fine Gael was elected for Wexford at the 1937 general election.

== Result ==
1936 Wexford by-election
| Party | Candidate | FPv% | Count | | |
| Party | Candidate | FPv% | 1 | 2 | 3 |
|---|---|---|---|---|---|
| Fianna Fáil | Denis Allen | 51.0 | 23,263 | | |
| Fine Gael | John Esmonde | 36.7 | 16,734 | 16,801 | 16,930 |
| Labour | Michael Murphy | 9.4 | 4,276 | 4,577 | 5,100 |
| Cumann Poblachta na hÉireann | Stephen Hayes | 2.9 | 1,301 | 1,408 | |
Electorate: 57,688 Valid: 45,574 Quota: 22,788 Turnout: 79.0%
