= Martin McDonogh =

Irish politician (1858–1934)

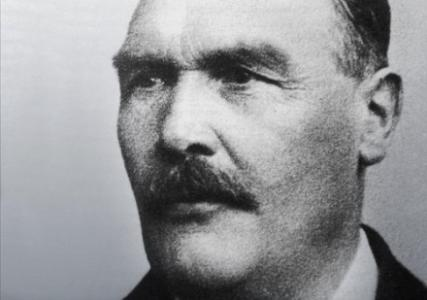
- McDonogh, c. 1927

Teachta Dála
- In office January 1933 – 24 November 1934
- In office June 1927 – February 1932
- Constituency: Galway

Personal details
- Born: 1858 Connemara, County Galway, Ireland
- Died: 24 November 1934 (aged 75–76) Galway, Ireland
- Party: Cumann na nGaedheal; Fine Gael
- Education: Coláiste Iognáid; St Stanislaus College

Martin McDonogh (1858 – 24 November 1934) was an Irish politician.

== Early life ==
Born in Gorumna, Connemara, to Thomas McDonogh and Honoria Hernon, McDonogh was the second son of six children who survived to adulthood. He was a cousin of the writer and journalist, Pádraic Ó Conaire. He was educated by the Jesuits at Coláiste Iognáid and later at St Stanislaus College in Tullabeg, County Offaly. He briefly studied law at University College Galway.

== Business career ==
McDonogh inherited his father's company, Thomas McDonogh & Sons, and expanded it to become one of the biggest employers in the province of Connacht. At its height, the company employed 700 people in an array of business ventures from a fertilizer factory to farming and electricity generation. A strict teetotaller, he never married.

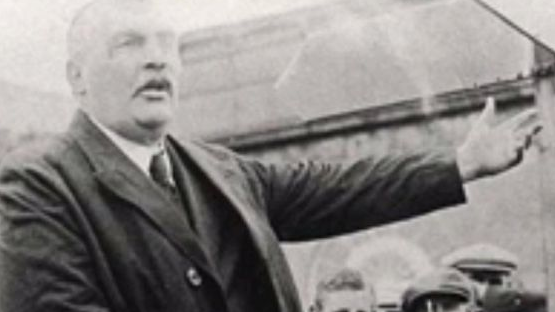
McDonogh was the leader of the Galway merchants during the lockout of 1912

McDonogh was known for being violently opposed to trade unions. He was the leader of the Galway Employers' Federation during the lockout of 1912 and the five-week general workers strike of 1913.

== Political career ==
McDonogh was first elected to Dáil Éireann as a Cumann na nGaedheal Teachta Dála (TD) for the Galway constituency at the June 1927 general election. He was re-elected at the September 1927 general election but lost his seat at the 1932 general election. He re-gained his seat at the 1933 general election, but died during the 8th Dáil in 1934. The by-election caused by his death was held on 19 June 1935 and was won by Eamon Corbett of Fianna Fáil.

He never married, and lived at Belmore, Salthill, County Galway, where he died on 24 November 1934. He was buried at Fonthill cemetery, Galway.

Dáil	Election	Deputy (Party)	Deputy (Party)	Deputy (Party)	Deputy (Party)	Deputy (Party)	Deputy (Party)	Deputy (Party)	Deputy (Party)	Deputy (Party)
2nd	1921	Liam Mellows (SF)	Bryan Cusack (SF)	Frank Fahy (SF)	Joseph Whelehan (SF)	Pádraic Ó Máille (SF)	George Nicolls (SF)	Patrick Hogan (SF)	7 seats 1921–1923	
3rd	1922	Thomas O'Connell (Lab)	Bryan Cusack (AT-SF)	Frank Fahy (AT-SF)	Joseph Whelehan (PT-SF)	Pádraic Ó Máille (PT-SF)	George Nicolls (PT-SF)	Patrick Hogan (PT-SF)	7 seats 1921–1923	
4th	1923	Thomas O'Connell (Lab)	Barney Mellows (Rep)	Frank Fahy (Rep)	Louis O'Dea (Rep)	Pádraic Ó Máille (CnaG)	George Nicolls (CnaG)	Patrick Hogan (CnaG)	Seán Broderick (CnaG)	James Cosgrave (Ind.)
5th	1927 (Jun)	Gilbert Lynch (Lab)	Thomas Powell (FF)	Frank Fahy (Note: Frank Fahy served as Ceann Comhairle from 9 March 1932.) (FF)	Seán Tubridy (FF)	Mark Killilea Snr (FF)	Martin McDonogh (CnaG)	Patrick Hogan (CnaG)	Seán Broderick (CnaG)	William Duffy (NL)
6th	1927 (Sep)	Stephen Jordan (FF)	Thomas Powell (FF)	Frank Fahy (FF)	Seán Tubridy (FF)	Mark Killilea Snr (FF)	Martin McDonogh (CnaG)	Patrick Hogan (CnaG)	Seán Broderick (CnaG)	Joseph Mongan (CnaG)
7th	1932	Stephen Jordan (FF)	Thomas Powell (FF)	Frank Fahy (FF)	Patrick Beegan (FF)	Gerald Bartley (FF)	Fred McDonogh (CnaG)	Patrick Hogan (CnaG)	Seán Broderick (CnaG)	Joseph Mongan (CnaG)
8th	1933	Stephen Jordan (FF)	Mark Killilea Snr (FF)	Frank Fahy (FF)	Patrick Beegan (FF)	Gerald Bartley (FF)	Séamus Keely (FF)	Patrick Hogan (CnaG)	Seán Broderick (CnaG)	Martin McDonogh (CnaG)
8th	1935 by-election	Stephen Jordan (FF)	Mark Killilea Snr (FF)	Frank Fahy (FF)	Patrick Beegan (FF)	Gerald Bartley (FF)	Séamus Keely (FF)	Patrick Hogan (CnaG)	Seán Broderick (CnaG)	Eamon Corbett (FF)
8th	1936 by-election	Stephen Jordan (FF)	Mark Killilea Snr (FF)	Frank Fahy (FF)	Patrick Beegan (FF)	Gerald Bartley (FF)	Séamus Keely (FF)	Martin Neilan (FF)	Seán Broderick (CnaG)	Eamon Corbett (FF)
9th	1937	Constituency abolished. See Galway East and Galway West								
