= 1936 Galway by-election =

By-election to the 8th Dáil

- 13 August 1936
- Turnout: 65,942 (67.5%)
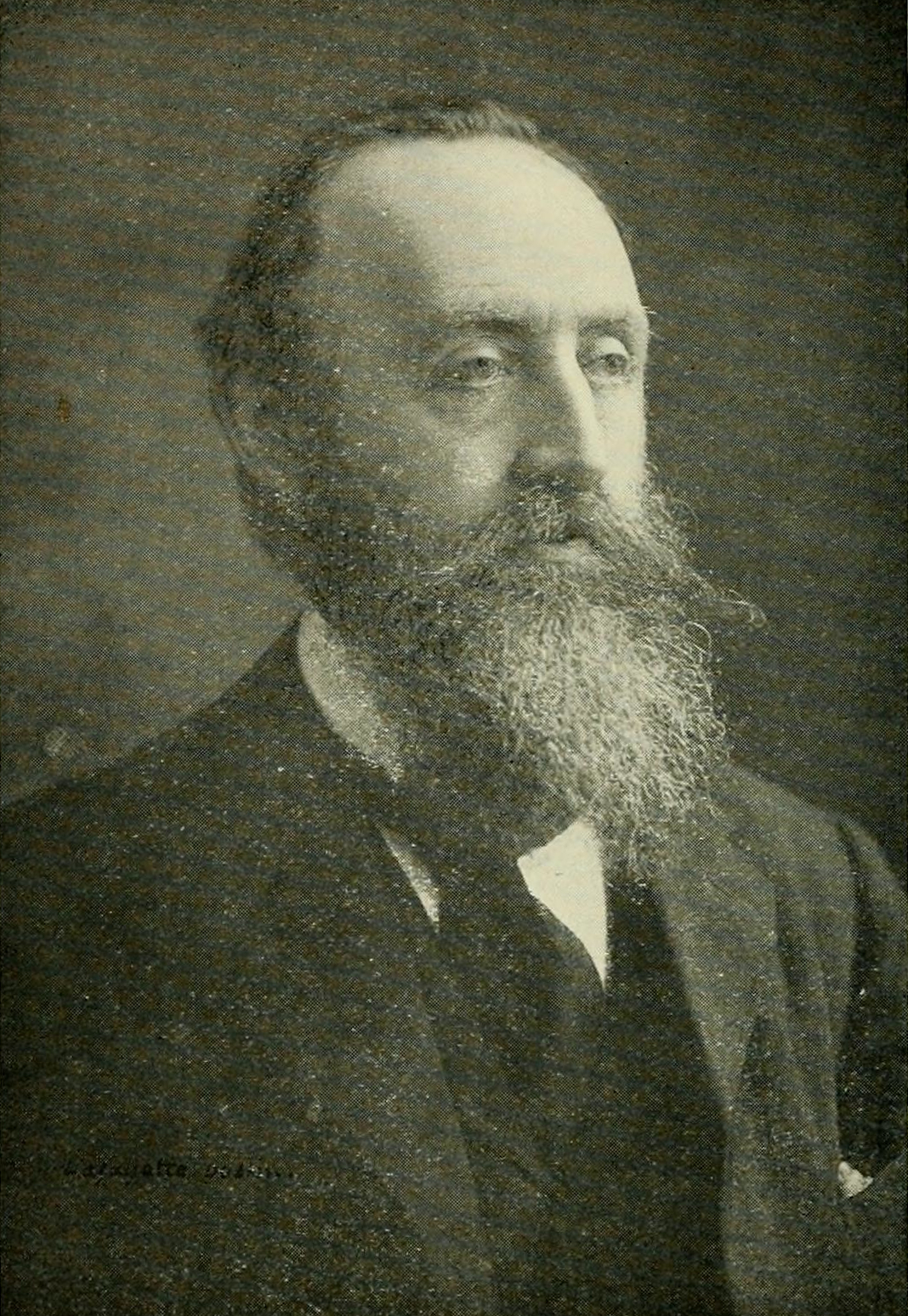
	Neilan	Hogan
Nominee	Martin Neilan	James Hogan	George Noble Plunkett (Note: George Noble Plunkett stood as a joint Cumann Poblachta na hÉireann/Sinn Féin candidate.)
Party	Fianna Fáil	Fine Gael	Cumann Poblachta na hÉireann
First preferences	39,982	16,734	4,276
Percentage	60.6%	36.7%	9.4%
Final count	–	16,930	5,100
TD before election
Patrick Hogan
Fine Gael
TD after election
Martin Neilan
Fianna Fáil

A Dáil by-election was held in the constituency of Galway in the Irish Free State on Thursday, 13 August 1936, to fill a vacancy in the 8th Dáil. It followed the death of Fine Gael TD Patrick Hogan on 14 July 1936.

In 1936, Galway was a nine seat constituency comprising County Galway. The writ of election to fill the vacancy was agreed by the Dáil on 23 July 1936. The by-election was won by the Fianna Fáil candidate Martin Neilan.

The surplus votes of the elected candidate Martin Neilan, were distributed after being declared elected. This was because there was a possibility another candidate could have reached the threshold of a third of a quota which would have meant their election deposit was returned to them.

Neilan did not contest the 1937 general election and retired from politics. This was the second by-election in Galway during the 8th Dáil.

== Result ==
1936 Galway by-election
Party	Candidate	FPv%	Count	
Party	Candidate	FPv%	1	2
Fianna Fáil	Martin Neilan	60.6	39,982	
Fine Gael	James Hogan	35.3	23,264	25,073
Cumann Poblachta na hÉireann	George Noble Plunkett	4.1	2,696	5,711
Electorate: 97,736 Valid: 65,942 Quota: 32,972 Turnout: 67.5%
