= Margaret Berry =

Australian educationist (1832–1918)

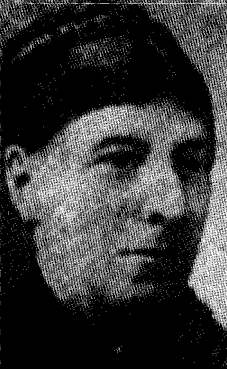
- Born: 24 August 1832; Naas, Kildare
- Died: 3 November 1918 (aged 86); New Farm, Brisbane
- Education: Marlborough Street Training College
- Occupation: headteacher
- Known for: founding head of Brisbane Girls' Normal School
- Successor: Elizabeth Large

Margaret Berry (24 August 1832 – 3 November 1918) was an Irish Australian headteacher and educationist. She was the head teacher at Brisbane Girls' Normal School for 43 years.

== Life ==
Berry was born in Ireland at Kildare's county town of Naas. Her mother was Margaret (born Allen) and her father Terence Berry was a clerk. Marlborough Street Training College in Dublin had begun training women to be teachers in 1844 and in 1851 Berry was there for six months to become a teacher. She taught in Ireland and she then migrated to Australia. Her younger sister, Ellen, also migrated at some time.

== Australia ==
In 1857 she was teaching at a Catholic school in Bathurst and in the following year she was in Sydney at the National School. The new state of Queensland was establishing its own schools. She was in Sydney until 1860 when she moved to Queensland. Brisbane Normal School opened in 1860 when it was co-educational. A separate building for boys was complete in 1862 and she was the head of the Girls' School. She was to lead the school for 43 years until she was succeeded by Elizabeth Large in 1905. In 1874 there was royal commission into education and Berry went to give evidence. Some had refused, but she spoke out boldly against the Queensland school inspector Randal MacDonnell. MacDonnell had been instrumental in getting her the job of head but she complained about his interference in her school. MacDonnell had appointed an assistant teacher and he interfered with the school's music curriculum. Berry spoke out. She also complained about salary levels. In the following year new legislation made education up to the age of twelve compulsory and it was to funded by the government if the school was not associated with a church.

Berry died in the Brisbane suburb of New Farm. There is a plaque in the school she led for so long that celebrates her and her successor's contribution.
