= Dermot Kinlen =

Judge of the High Court
- In office 14 March 1993 – 3 July 2002
- Nominated by: Government of Ireland
- Appointed by: Mary Robinson

Personal details
- Born: Dermot Patrick Kinlen; 24 April 1930 Dublin, Ireland
- Died: 18 July 2007 (aged 77) Fenit, County Kerry, Ireland
- Education: University College Dublin; King's Inns

Dermot Patrick Kinlen (24 April 1930 – 18 July 2007) was an Irish judge and barrister who served as a Judge of the High Court from 1993 to 2002. He was best known for being the first inspector of prisons, after many years of there being none, in Ireland. In his reports he was very critical of the way the prison service was being run and in particular of the lack of any focus on rehabilitation.

He was appointed a High Court judge in 1993, having been nominated by the government of Taoiseach Albert Reynolds, particularly on the advice of Tánaiste Dick Spring of the Labour Party, in spite of his links to Fianna Fáil.

He practiced as a barrister on the South Western Circuit. Speaking after his death, a spokesperson for the legal profession in Kerry described him as "pleasant and friendly."

He was involved in the setting up of diplomatic relations between the People's Republic of China and Ireland. From 1977 onwards, he was a frequent visitor to China. The University of Limerick awarded him an honorary Doctorate of Law.

In 1997, Pope John Paul II bestowed the Order of St. Gregory on Kinlen.

Kinlen's maternal grandfather, Thomas O'Donnell, had been an MP for West Kerry for 18 years, at the beginning of the 20th century.

Kinlen died at his home in Fenit, County Kerry, on 18 July 2007 and was buried in Dublin on 21 July 2007.
