= Love O' Mike =

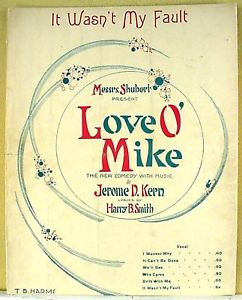
- Sheet music cover
- Music: Jerome Kern
- Lyrics: Harry B. Smith
- Book: Thomas Sydney

Love O' Mike is a musical comedy in two acts and a prologue with book by Thomas Sydney, lyrics by Harry B. Smith, and music by Jerome Kern. The show, produced by Elisabeth Marbury and Lee Shubert, had performances in Philadelphia, Pittsburgh, and Detroit before heading to New York's Shubert Theatre, where it opened January 15, 1917.

The musical director was Frank Tours and the music was orchestrated by Frank Saddler. The show was staged by J. H. Benrimo; scenic design by Robert McQuinn; and costume design by Faibsey. It had three runs. The first run ran until March 17 or 18, 1917. It played at the Maxine Elliott Theatre from March 19, 1917, until June 30, 1917, and then at the Casino Theatre from August 27, 1917, until September 29, 1917. It is considered to have run for 233 performances.

Although the opening night leading actors were George Baldwin, Jack Bohn, Helen Clarke, Lillian Devere, Alan Edwards, Gloria Goodwin, and Rollin Grimes, Jr., Gerald Boardman says “Playgoers glancing at the program probably paid little attention to the names of several bit players – names like Luella Gear, Peggy Wood, and Clifton Webb, that would soon command their own glamour.”

== Plot ==
Setting: Bronxville, New York

The plot follows a boy meets girl, boy loses girl, boy gets girl back formula which critics found boringly predictable.

== Songs ==
Prologue
- "Drift with Me"

Act 1

- "Tell Me"
- "It Wasn't Your Fault (It Wasn't My Fault)" (lyrics by Herbert Reynolds)
- "Don't Tempt Me"
- "We'll See"
- "I Wonder Why"

Act 2

- "Moo Cow"
- "Life's a Dance"
- "A Lonesome Little Tune (Simple Little Tune)"
- "Hoot Mon"
- "It's in the Book (Look in the Book)"
- "LuLu"
