= Sir Thomas Esmonde, 11th Baronet =

Irish politician (1862–1935)

Sir Thomas Esmonde KHS
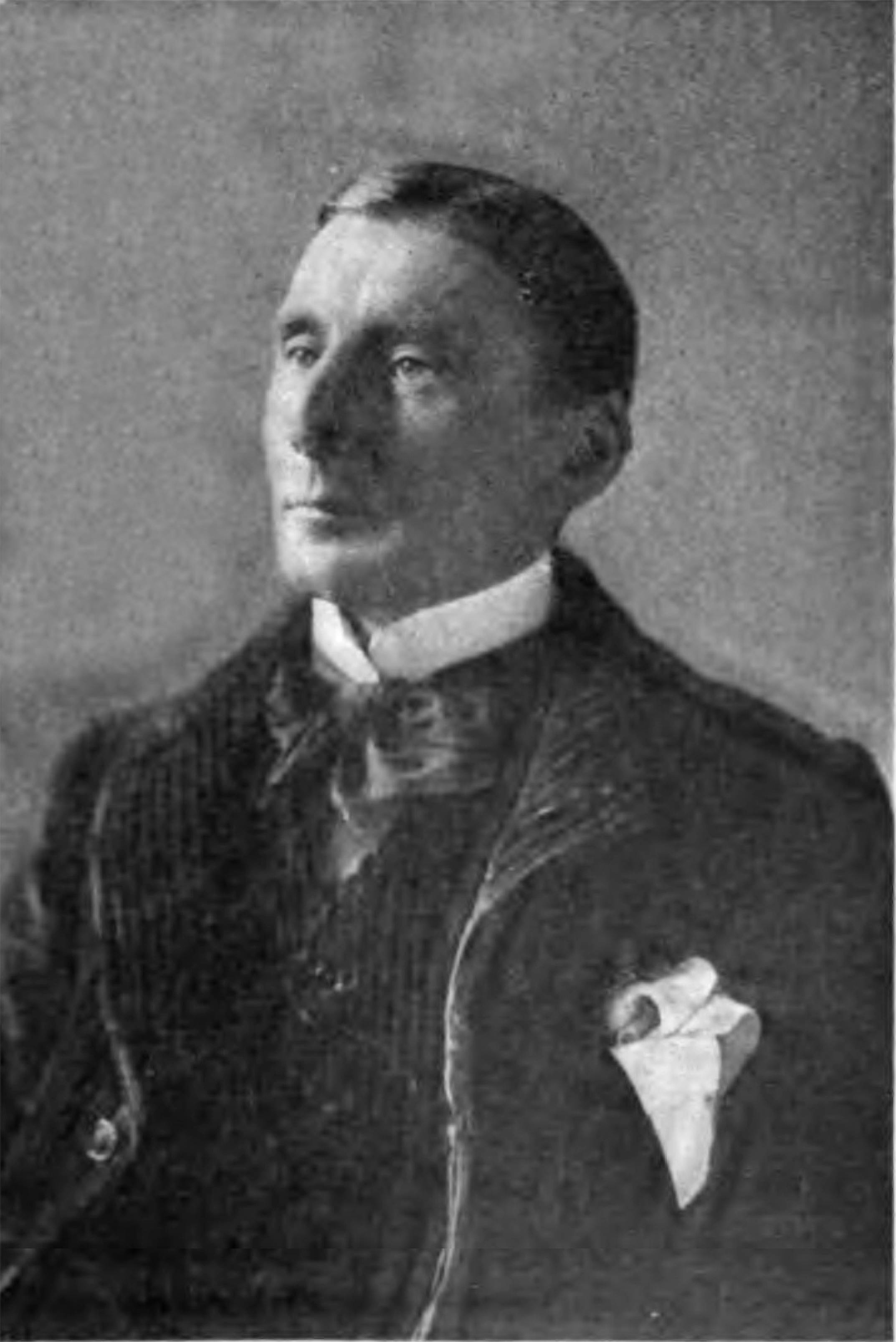
- Esmonde in 1907

Senator
- In office 11 December 1922 – 12 December 1934

Member of Parliament for North Wexford
- In office October 1900 – December 1918
- Preceded by: Thomas Joseph Healy
- Succeeded by: Roger Sweetman

Member of Parliament for West Kerry
- In office July 1892 – October 1900
- Preceded by: Edward Harrington
- Succeeded by: Thomas O'Donnell

Member of Parliament for South Dublin
- In office December 1885 – July 1892
- Preceded by: New constituency
- Succeeded by: Horace Plunkett

Personal details
- Born: 21 September 1862 County Wexford, Ireland
- Died: 15 September 1935 (aged 72) County Wexford, Ireland
- Party: Irish Parliamentary Party (1885–1918); Independent (after 1918)
- Spouses: Alice Donovan (m. 1891; died 1922); Anna Frances Levins (m. 1924)
- Parent: John Esmonde (father)

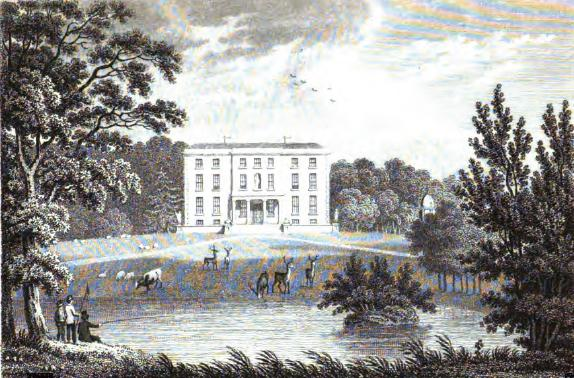
Ballynastragh House, County Wexford, home of the Esmonde family – from a drawing published 1826.

Sir Thomas Henry Grattan Esmonde, 11th Baronet, KHS (21 September 1862 – 15 September 1935) was an Irish Home Rule nationalist politician and author.

== Politics ==
Esmonde represented the Irish Parliamentary Party as an MP for the constituencies of South Dublin from 1885 to 1892; West Kerry from 1892 to 1900; and North Wexford from 1900 to 1918. He also sat as an independent Senator in the Oireachtas from 1922 to 1934. He was High Sheriff of County Waterford in 1887.

== Personal life ==
He was the son of Sir John Esmonde, 10th Baronet and his wife Louisa, daughter of the younger Henry Grattan (making him a great-grandson of the pre-Union Irish statesman Henry Grattan).

In July 1891, he married Alice Donovan of Tralee. Alice and Esmonde had five children:

- Alngelda Barbara Mary Grattan Esmonde
- Eithne Moira Grattan Esmonde; married her second cousin Sir Anthony Esmonde, 15th Baronet
- Patricia Alison Louisa Grattan Esmonde
- Sir Osmond Esmonde, 12th Baronet (1896–1936)
- John Henry Grattan Esmonde (1899–1916); killed in the Battle of Jutland

Alice died in December 1922, and in September 1924 Esmonde married Anna Frances Levins.

Esmonde's home, Ballynastragh House, located near Gorey, County Wexford, and dating from the 17th century, was burned down on 9 March 1923 by members of the anti-Treaty Irish Republican Army. The house was rebuilt on a much smaller scale in 1937.

Esmonde was a frequent traveller and author of articles on Irish folklore and antiquities, as well as a memoir, Hunting Memories of Many Lands (1920). He died in Dublin, six days before his 73rd birthday.

Sir Thomas Esmonde, 11th Baronet
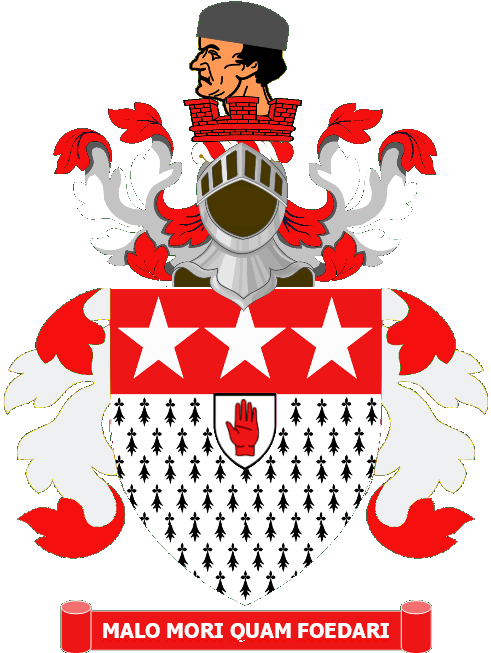
- Crest: Out of a mural crown Gules a head in profile wearing a helmet all Proper.
- Shield: Ermine on a chief Gules three mullets Argent.
- Motto: Malo Mori Quam Foedari (Had Rather Die Than Be Dishonoured)

In 1902 he founded the Enniscorthy Echo in co-operation with William Sears.

== Honours ==
Knight of the Order of the Holy Sepulchre.

== See also ==
- Families in the Oireachtas

Parliament of the United Kingdom
New creation	Member of Parliament for South Dublin; 1885–1892	Succeeded by Horace Plunkett
Preceded by Edward Harrington	Member of Parliament for West Kerry; 1892–1900	Succeeded by Thomas O'Donnell
Preceded by Thomas Joseph Healy	Member of Parliament for North Wexford; 1900–1918	Succeeded by Roger Sweetman
Baronetage of Ireland
Preceded by John Esmonde	Baronet (of Clonegall); 1876–1935	Succeeded by Osmond Esmonde
