= Anna Frances Levins =

Irish American artist, publisher, author, and activist (1876–1941)

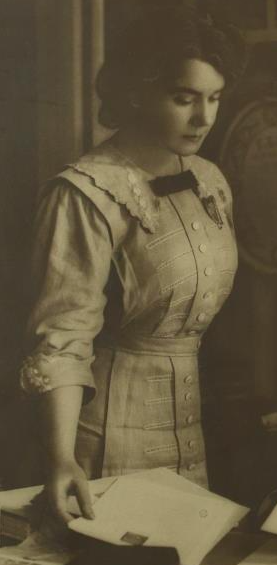
Anna Frances Levins in 1915

Anna Frances Levins (March 21, 1876 – July 15, 1941) was an Irish American photographer, publisher, author, painter and activist whose works appeared in publications including The New York Times, Vogue and The Boston Globe. She was lauded as “a pioneer woman photographer and a leader in Irish cultural pursuits.” Her portrait sitters included Pope Pius X, William Henry O’Connell, Eamon de Valera, Elisabeth Marbury and John McCormack. The Levins Press, a company she founded and ran in New York and Dublin, published illustrated books about Irish history, literature, culture and independence battles by authors including her husband, Sir Thomas Henry Grattan Esmonde (1862-1935), an Irish baronet. She turned part of her Manhattan office into “a gallery of Irish heroes,” exhibiting her photos and paintings of Irish leaders and martyrs, including Kevin Barry, who were executed after the 1916 Easter Rising.

== Biography ==
Levins was one of six surviving children of the builder Peter Levins (1815-September 26, 1894) and Nanno Hale (March 25, 1836 – May 13, 1929), Irish immigrants who settled on the Lower East Side and then the Bronx. Peter's brother Thomas C. Levins was an early pastor at St. Patrick's Old Cathedral whose library became a foundational core of Georgetown University's library. Anna Frances and her sisters Clare, Elizabeth (a clerk for the Board of Education), and Julia (a schoolteacher) long lived with their widowed mother Nanno. Anna Frances attended St. Brigid's school on the Lower East Side, where she studied portrait painting. By the early 1900s she had apprenticed with photographer George G. Rockwood and then traveled in Europe, taking photographs of celebrated figures including Edward VII. By 1909 she was deemed “one of the few women to have a real success of photography in all its phases.”

From 1909 until her marriage in 1924, she maintained a studio and gallery in midtown Manhattan. Her longtime address was 5 East 35th Street, where she used Irish turf as fireplace fuel and welcomed anyone interested in Irish culture, industry, history and independence campaigns. Her office was also the headquarters of the Levins Press. She hosted lectures and concerts at her office and at the Waldorf-Astoria for a group she founded, the American Daughters of Ireland, and for the Gaelic League. Performers, authors, politicians and religious leaders gathered at her office and posed for her paintings and photos. Known as “the Irish-American Image-Maker,” she developed “the reputation of having photographed more celebrities than any other woman in the business.” She had her clothing made from Irish textiles and urged Americans to support Irish independence, battling against “the whole machinery of English tyranny.” She served as the American Irish Historical Society's official photographer and its executive council's only woman. She traveled to photograph in Newfoundland and remote parts of Ireland, and on the lecture circuit for her work she was known as “the most Irish travelled woman in the world."

On September 15, 1924, she married the baronet. Participants in the ceremony included Thomas Joseph Shahan, John W. Goff and Patrick Hayes. She and Sir Thomas had homes in County Wexford and in Dublin, where the Levins Press published her husband's writings on art, history and hunting. The couple made regular trips to Rome (where he served as a papal chamberlain) and Canada, where they fished and hunted. They donated objects and artworks to American and European institutions, including the American Irish Historical Society, the Vatican Library and National Museum of Ireland. Her stepchildren unsuccessfully battled her in court for control over Sir Thomas's estate. Levins died on July 15, 1941, while visiting friends in upstate New York. Her funeral drew hundreds of people. She is buried in the Levins family plot at Calvary Cemetery in Queens. An obituary in The New York Times described her as “long prominent in church and Irish-American circles.”

== Works ==
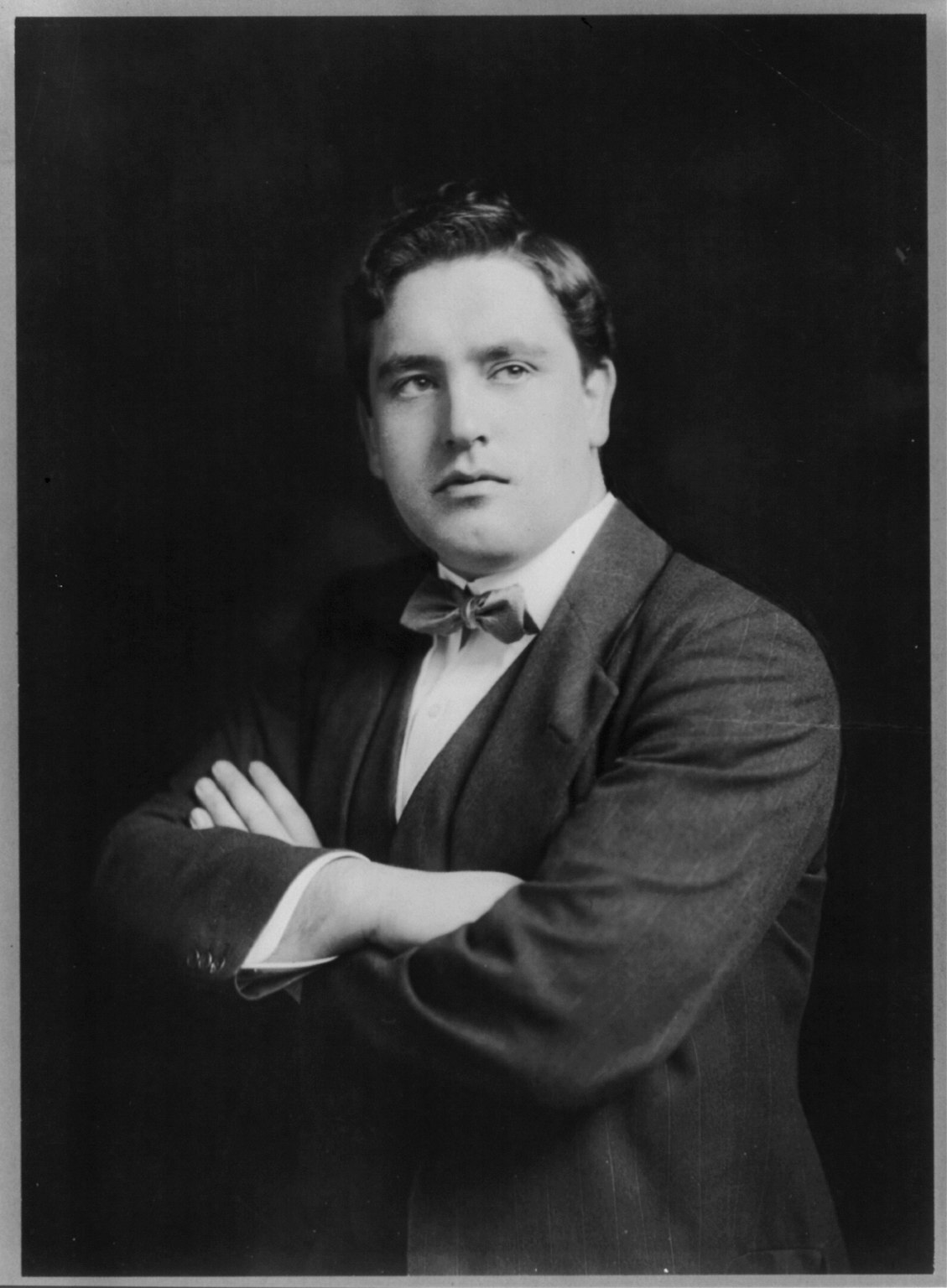
Anna Frances Levins's photo of singer John McCormack

She portrayed Catholic leaders including Pope Pius X, Giovanni Bonzano, Catherine Caouette, Daniel Joseph Curley, Diomede Falconio, John Farley, James Gibbons, Patrick Hayes, John Healy, Michael Logue, Daniel Mannix, George Mundelein, William O’Connell, and Edward P. Tivnan. Among the politicians, judges and activists who posed for her were Daniel F. Cohalan, Michael Collins, William J. Corcoran, Joseph Devlin, John W. Goff, Shane Leslie, Joseph McGarrity, T. P. O’Connor, Kathleen O’Connell, Patrick Pearse, Eugene A. Philbin, John P. Redmond, Grace Strachan, Timothy Daniel Sullivan, and Eamon de Valera. Writers, scholars, artists and performers who posed for her included John J. Boyle, Joseph I. C. Clarke, Dr. Thomas Addis Emmet (descendant of Thomas Addis Emmet), Adeline Genee, Peter Golden, George Wharton James, Florence Foster Jenkins, John McCormack, Adelaide Wallerstein McConnell, and W. B. Yeats. Newspapers and periodicals that published her photos include the Brooklyn Daily Eagle, Catholic Union and Times, Daily News, Detroit Free Press, Ireland, Irish American, The Journal of the American Irish Historical Society, Moving Picture News, New York Times, Out West, The Spur, Theatre and Vogue. Photos that she copyrighted include portraits of Strachan (copyright J 167620), Farley (J 174559), McCormack (J 181400), Boyle (J 192402), Hayes (J 193197), Logue, Bonzano (J 218020), Gibbons (J 218018), O'Connor (J 218014), Mundelein (J 210871 and 210872), Barry (J 250598 and 250599) and Collins (J 251592). Her hand-colored views of the Irish countryside were considered America's “finest collection of Irish photographs.” She also offered photo restoration services and printed poems on greeting cards. Her paintings of Irish martyrs of uprisings including Kevin Barry drew "admiring spectators" at her studio.

She photographed historical documents, paintings and prints for books including Dr. Emmet's Memoir of Thomas Addis and Robert Emmet (New York: Emmet Press, 1915), Maurice Joy's The Irish Rebellion of 1916 and Its Martyrs: Erin’s Tragic Easter (New York: Devin-Adair Co., 1916), and Michael J. O’Brien's A Hidden Phase of American History: Ireland’s Part in America’s Struggle for Liberty (New York: Dodd, Mead, 1919). Her images for the Emmet memoir were described as "judiciously selected and sumptuously produced." Levins Press in New York published A Little Irish Gift Book (1916), Freedom! The Battle Cry of Ireland, Patriotic Poems Collected by Anna Frances Levins (1917), and Reverend John Cavanaugh's Thomas Addis Emmet, M.D. A personal tribute (1919). Freedom! was deemed “a delight to Irish eyes, a joy to Irish hearts.” In Dublin, Levins Press issued three volumes written by Sir Thomas: Gentlemen! The Queen!: An Irish Reverie (1926), which chronicles the family's history and 1923 torching of their mansion, Ballynastragh; An Irish Picture Gallery (1927), about the Esmonde art collection that was saved from the fire; and More Hunting Memories (1930).

== Legacy ==
Institutions owning Levins's donations, photos and papers include the American Irish Historical Society (artifacts, brochures, books, photos, correspondence), Belfast Public Library (her gift of books to Francis Joseph Bigger), Vatican Library (Sir Thomas's hunting books), National Museum of Ireland (paintings, photographs, artifacts, ephemera), Library of Congress, Archdiocese of Boston and New York archives, Catholic University's Thomas Joseph Shahan papers, Notre Dame's John Cavanaugh papers, Georgetown University's Quigley Archive, and University College Dublin's collections of de Valera and O'Connell papers.
