= Cumann Poblachta na hÉireann =

Irish political party

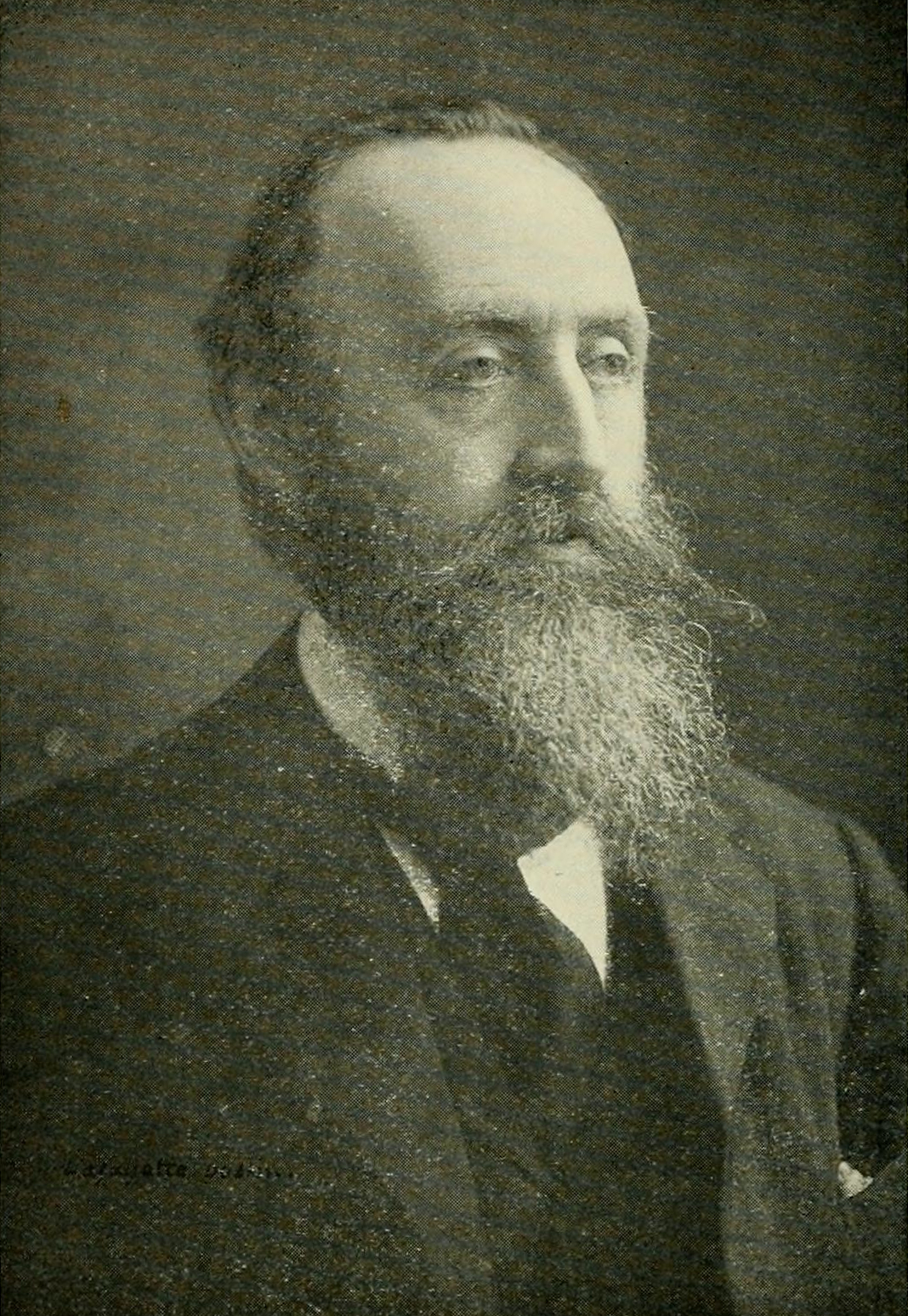
George Noble Plunkett stood on behalf of the party, albeit also simultaneously on behalf of Sinn Féin

Cumann Poblachta na hÉireann (Irish pronunciation: [ˈkʊmˠən̪ˠ ˈpˠɔbˠlˠəxt̪ˠə n̪ˠə ˈheːɾʲən̪ˠ]; English: "Republican Society of Ireland") was a political party established by the Irish Republican Army in 1936. It existed until 1937.

It was founded in Barry's Hotel, Dublin, on 7 March 1936, and decided to adopt a policy of abstentionism with regard to any seats it might win in elections to the Free State Oireachtas and the Parliament of Northern Ireland.

The party was led by prominent IRA members. Paddy McLogan served as party chairman; former IRA chief of staff Andy Cooney was another leading member. Madge Daly (sister of Ned Daly and Kathleen Clarke), Fionna Plunkett (sister of Joseph Plunkett), Seán MacBride, Joseph P. Brennan, Peadar O'Donnell and Moss Twomey were also members. General Eoin O'Duffy attended the founding meeting but never became a member.

In 1936, the party ran two candidates in by-elections to the 8th Dáil:

- At the 1936 Galway by-election, on 13 August, George Noble Plunkett ran as a joint Cumann Poblachta na hÉireann/Sinn Féin candidate. Losing his deposit, he polled 2,696 votes (4.1%).
- At the 1936 Wexford by-election, held on 17 August, Stephen Hayes polled 1,301 votes (2.9%) and lost his deposit.
