= 1935 Galway by-election =

By-election to the 8th Dáil

- 19 June 1935
- Turnout: 61,503 (63.0%)
	Corbett	McDonogh
Nominee	Eamon Corbett	Thomas McDonogh
Party	Fianna Fáil	Fine Gael
First preferences	37,415	24,088
Percentage	60.8%	39.2%
TD before election
Martin McDonogh
Fine Gael
TD after election
Eamon Corbett
Fianna Fáil

A Dáil by-election was held in the constituency of Galway in the Irish Free State on Wednesday, 19 June 1935, to fill a vacancy in the 8th Dáil. It followed the death of Fine Gael TD Martin McDonogh on 24 November 1934. In 1935, Galway was a nine seat constituency comprising County Galway.

The writ of election to fill the vacancy was agreed by the Dáil on 29 May 1935. The by-election was won by the Fianna Fáil candidate Eamon Corbett.

This was the first by-election in Galway during the 8th Dáil.

== Result ==
1935 Galway by-election
Party	Candidate	FPv%	Count
Party	Candidate	FPv%	1
Fianna Fáil	Eamon Corbett	60.8	37,415
Fine Gael	Thomas McDonogh	39.2	24,088
Electorate: 97,650 Valid: 61,503 Quota: 30,752 Turnout: 63.0%
