= Marlborough Street Training College =

Irish teacher training college (1837–1922)

Marlborough Street Training College was a tertiary educational facility in Marlborough Street, Dublin, Ireland. It was established in 1837 by the Commissioners of National Education, for the training of male national school teachers. In 1844, female teachers began to be trained in Marlborough Street too. Margaret Berry, who was a leading headteacher in Australia, was trained here in 1851.

Marlborough Street was a non-denominational institution, however, since the Church of Ireland had Kildare Place, and the Catholic Church had its own colleges, it was predominantly working with students of Presbyterian background.

Some buildings of the former training college form part of the Department of Education complex in Marlborough Street. Talbot House housed female students. Marlborough Hall in Glasnevin housed male teacher trainees; it closed in 1917.

Marlborough Street College was closed by Minister of Education Eoin MacNeill in 1922, following Irish independence.
