= West Kerry (UK Parliament constituency) =

Former UK county constituency (1885–1922)

- Former county constituency for the House of Commons

1885–1922
- Seats: 1
- Created from: County Kerry and Tralee
- Replaced by: Kerry–Limerick West

West Kerry was a parliamentary constituency in Ireland, represented in the Parliament of the United Kingdom. From 1885 to 1922 it returned one Member of Parliament (MP) to the House of Commons of the United Kingdom of Great Britain and Ireland.

Prior to the 1885 general election the area was part of the County Kerry constituency. Representation in this constituency ceased at the 1922 United Kingdom general election, which took place on 15 November, shortly before the establishment of the Irish Free State on 6 December 1922. The successor constituency in the new Dáil Éireann was Kerry–Limerick West, first established under the Government of Ireland Act 1920 to elect members to the House of Commons of Southern Ireland in 1921.

== Boundaries ==
This constituency comprised the western part of County Kerry.

1885–1922: The barony of Corkaguiny and that part of the barony of Trughanacmy contained within the parishes of Annagh, Ardfert, Ballynahaglish, Ballyseedy, Clogherbrien, Fenit, Kilcolman, Kilgarrylander, Kiltallagh, Ratass and Tralee.

== Members of Parliament ==
Years	Member	Party
1885–1890	Edward Harrington	Irish Parliamentary Party
1891–1892	Edward Harrington	Parnellite
1892–1900	Sir Thomas Esmonde Bt	Irish National Federation
1900–1918	Thomas O'Donnell	Irish Parliamentary Party
1918–1922	Austin Stack	Sinn Féin

== Elections ==
=== Elections in the 1880s ===
1885 general election: West Kerry
Party	Candidate	Votes	%	±%
Irish Parliamentary	Edward Harrington	2,607	90.9	
Irish Conservative	William Rowan	262	9.1	
Majority		2,345	81.8	
Turnout		2,869	50.6	
Registered electors		5,668		
Irish Parliamentary win (new seat)				

1886 general election: West Kerry
Party	Candidate	Votes	%	±%
Irish Parliamentary	Edward Harrington	Unopposed		
Irish Parliamentary hold				

=== Elections in the 1890s ===
1892 general election: West Kerry
Party	Candidate	Votes	%	±%
Irish National Federation	Thomas Esmonde	2,490	67.7	N/A
Irish National League	Edward Harrington	1,143	31.1	N/A
Irish Unionist	Richard Elliott Palmer	43	1.2	New
Majority		1,347	36.6	N/A
Turnout		3,676	58.0	N/A
Registered electors		6,336		
Irish National Federation gain from Irish Parliamentary		Swing	N/A	

1895 general election: West Kerry
Party	Candidate	Votes	%	±%
Irish National Federation	Thomas Esmonde	Unopposed		
Irish National Federation hold				

=== Elections in the 1900s ===
1900 general election: West Kerry
Party	Candidate	Votes	%	±%
Irish Parliamentary	Thomas O'Donnell	2,464	69.8	N/A
Healyite Nationalist	James Edward John Julian	1,065	30.2	N/A
Majority		1,399	39.6	N/A
Turnout		3,529	60.4	N/A
Registered electors		5,845		
Irish Parliamentary hold		Swing	N/A	

1906 general election: West Kerry
Party	Candidate	Votes	%	±%
Irish Parliamentary	Thomas O'Donnell	Unopposed		
Irish Parliamentary hold				

=== Elections in the 1910s ===
January 1910 general election: West Kerry
Party	Candidate	Votes	%	±%
Irish Parliamentary	Thomas O'Donnell	Unopposed		
Irish Parliamentary hold				

December 1910 general election: West Kerry
Party	Candidate	Votes	%	±%
Irish Parliamentary	Thomas O'Donnell	Unopposed		
Irish Parliamentary hold				

1918 general election: West Kerry
Party	Candidate	Votes	%	±%
Sinn Féin	Austin Stack	Unopposed		
Sinn Féin gain from Irish Parliamentary				
