= Elisabeth Marbury =

American literary and talent agent; translator

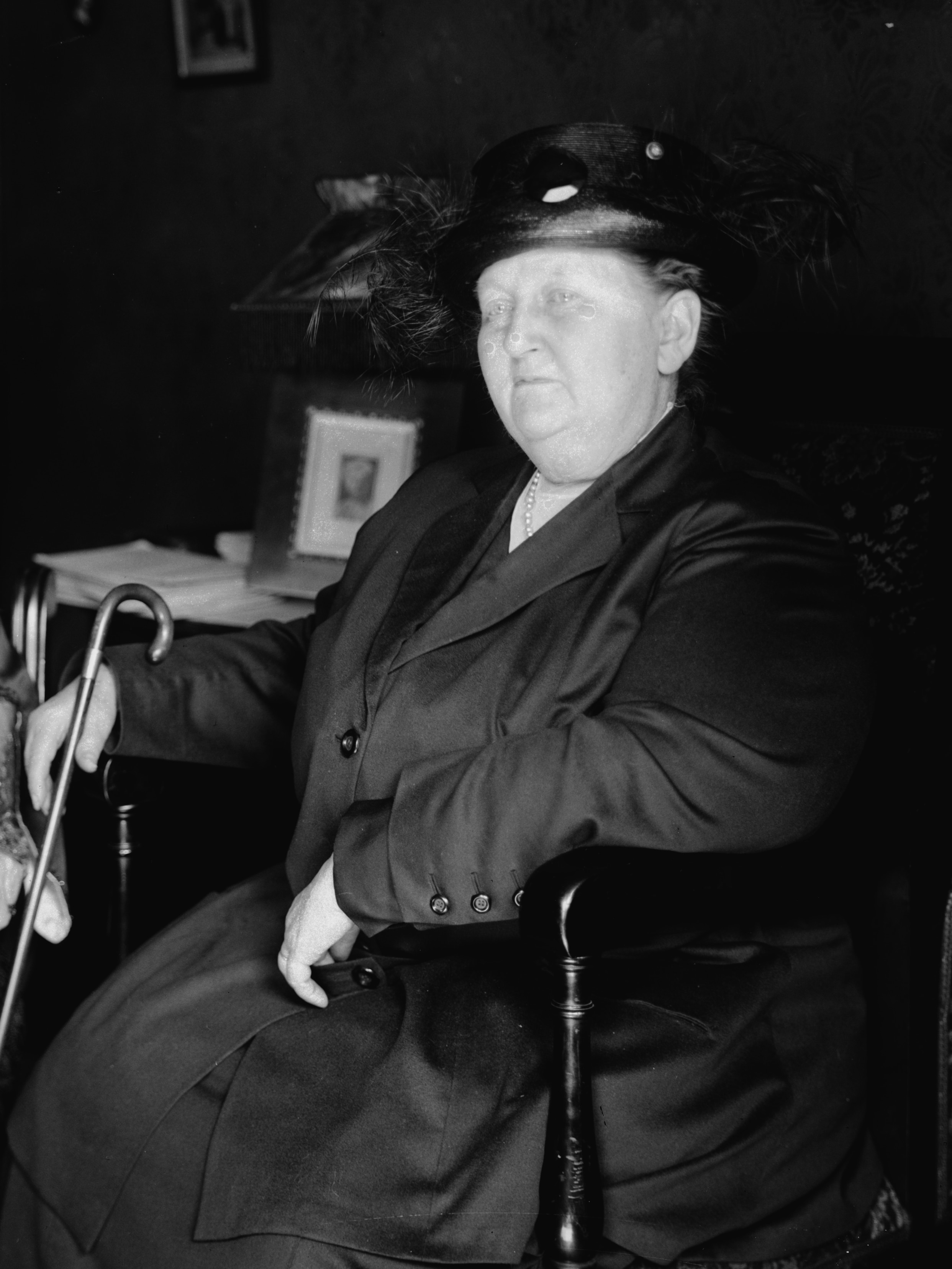
- Born: June 19, 1856; New York City, US
- Died: January 22, 1933 (aged 76); New York City, US
- Occupations: theatrical and literary agent; producer; author

Elisabeth Marbury (June 19, 1856 – January 22, 1933) was a pioneering American theatrical and literary agent and producer who helped shape business methods of the modern commercial theater, and encouraged women to enter that industry. Since 1892, Marbury had been living openly in a lesbian relationship with Elsie de Wolfe (later known as Lady Mendl), a prominent socialite and famous interior decorator.

== Personal life ==
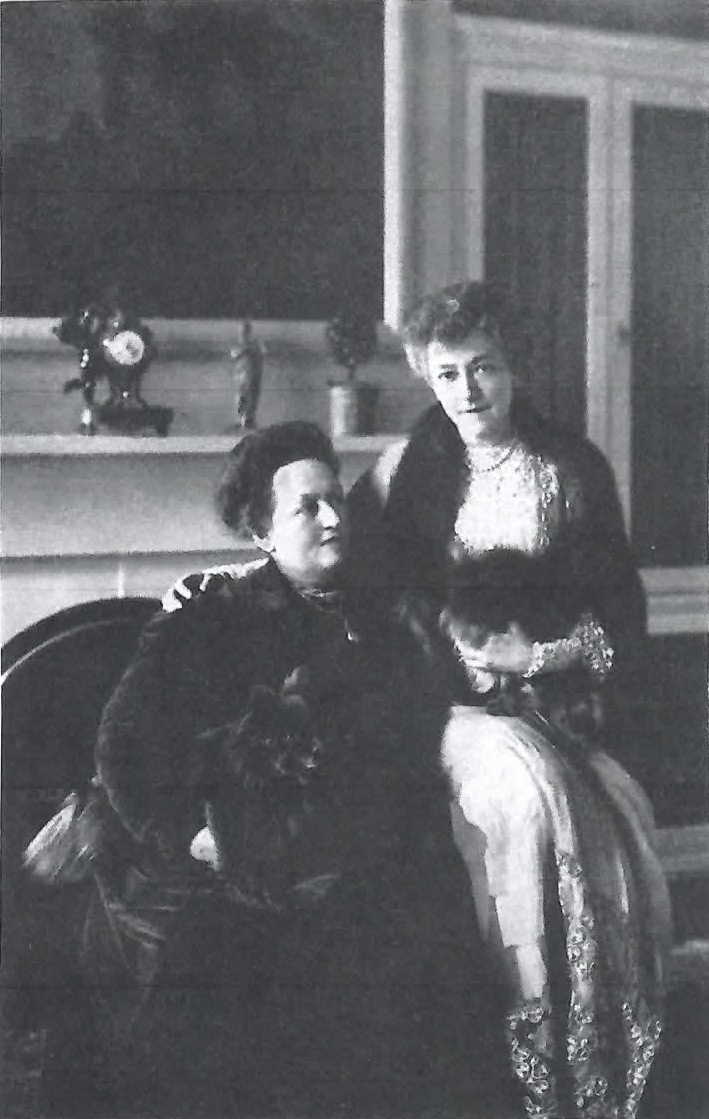
Bessie Marbury and Elsie de Wolfe, from My Crystal Ball (published 1923)

Marbury was born and raised in the affluent and cultured home of one of 19th-century New York's oldest and most prominent "society" families. She was reputedly a descendant of Calvinist Anne Hutchinson (née Marbury), who co-founded Rhode Island after her banishment from Massachusetts Bay Colony. Marbury both used and defied these connections during the Victorian era to establish herself as an important literary and theatrical talent agent and theatrical producer, helping to define and create these very professions as they emerged in the new world of mass production, advertising and popular culture in post-Civil War American society.

For some, Marbury is a contradictory figure. Although she was the embodiment of female independence in many ways, she initially opposed women's suffrage but reversed herself once American women received the right to vote.

In 1918, she became active in the Democratic Party, serving as a delegate.

Marbury was a convert to Roman Catholicism and was an active member of the Knights of Columbus, a Catholic organization.

In 1923, she published an autobiography, My Crystal Ball: Reminiscences (NY: Boni and Liveright, [1923]). (In 1888, she had published Manners: A Handbook of Social Customs.)

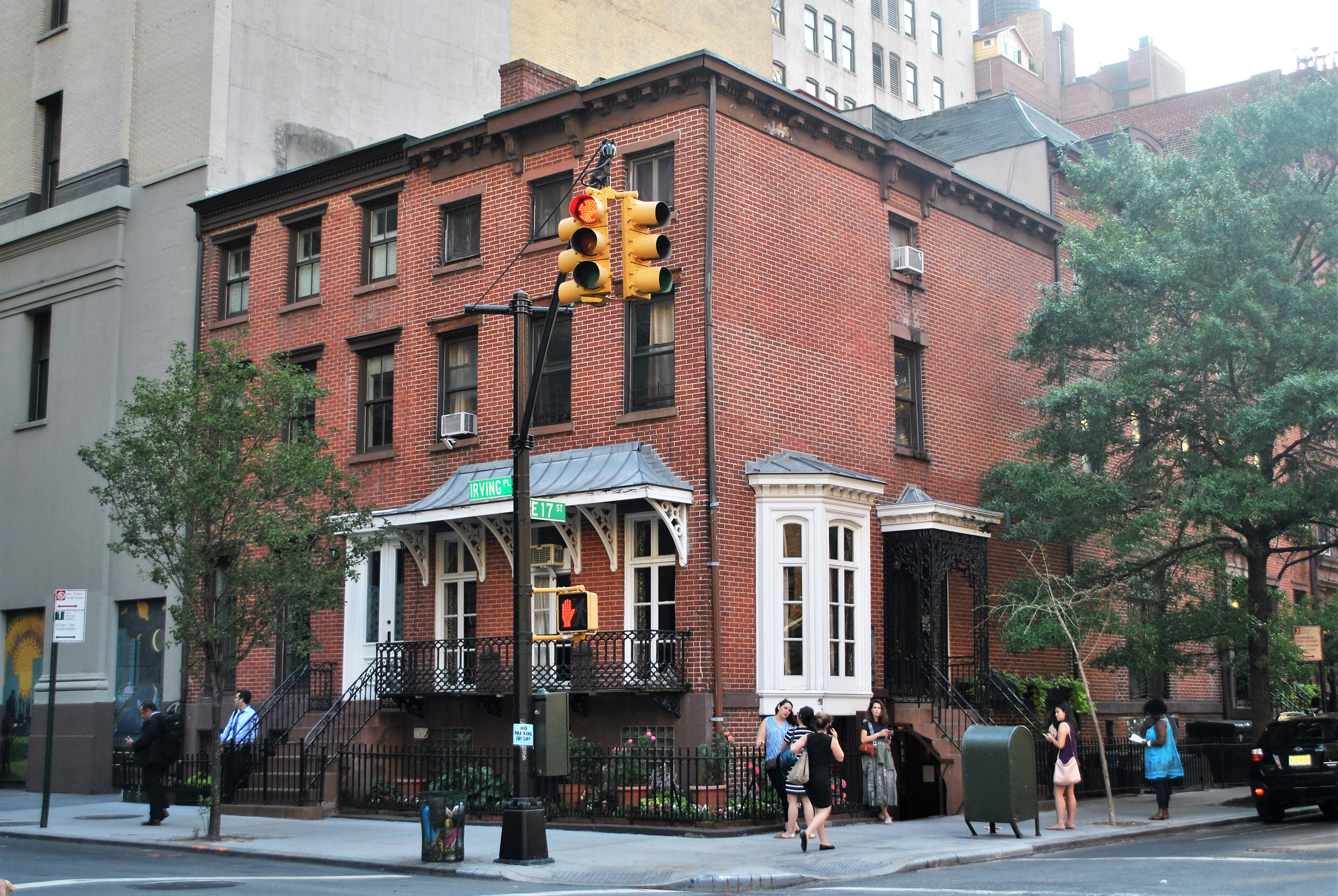
Irving House, New York City, NY

Marbury never married, but lived openly for more than 20 years with Elsie de Wolfe in what many observers accepted as a lesbian relationship, first at Irving House and then at 13 Sutton Place.

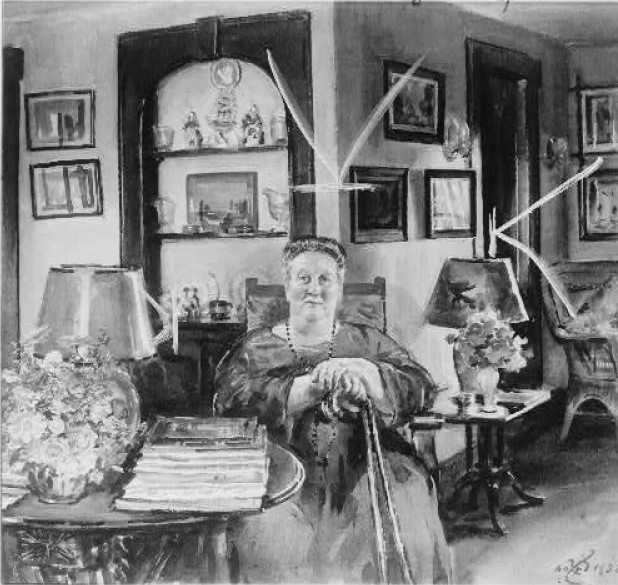
William Bruce Ellis Ranken (1881-1941)/LOC cph.3c13318. Photograph of painting by William Rankin of Elisabeth Marbury in her summer home

Marbury had a long lasting friendship with Elizabeth Arden (1878-1966), a Canadian-born American businesswoman who founded what is now Elizabeth Arden, Inc. They spent many weekends at Marbury's Maine home, Lakeside Farm. After Marbury's death in 1933, Arden bought the property with the intention of fulfilling Marbury's wish that it be turned into a home for working women—though it eventually became part of a luxury resort (the original Maine Chance Farm) instead.

Marbury died in 1933. Her funeral at St. Patrick's Cathedral was attended by an impressive array of the most important American leaders and dignitaries of the day. De Wolfe was noticeably absent from the funeral, despite the fact that she was the prime beneficiary of Marbury's will.

Bessie Marbury is buried in Woodlawn Cemetery in The Bronx, New York City.

== Professional life ==
Marbury's clients ranged from the French Academy of Letters to playwrights Oscar Wilde and George Bernard Shaw; to the dance team of Vernon and Irene Castle. She was an early promoter of African American writers of the Harlem Renaissance. She also played an instrumental role in developing the modern "Book Musical" that audiences came to know as defining "Broadway" in the 20th century, notably of Cole Porter's first musical, See America First, and Jerome Kern (Nobody Home (1915), Very Good, Eddie (1915), and Love O' Mike (1917)) through her American Play company.

Marbury and de Wolfe discovered their careers amid the amateur theatrical performances in high society in late Victorian New York. Both would end up defying this world's rules and expectations for women by making their interest in theater professional, and in no small way helped pave the way for many other "respectable ladies" that followed, both in the previously frowned upon world of the professional theater as well as independent careers and financial autonomy for women in general. Thus it was at an 1885 successful benefit theatrical performance that she had organized that Marbury was inspired to try her hand at theater management. In 1888 she persuaded Frances Hodgson Burnett, who had written a dramatic version of her best-selling Little Lord Fauntleroy, to hire her as business manager and agent. The association quickly proved highly profitable to both women.

In 1891, Marbury traveled to France, and for 15 years she was the representative in the English-speaking market for playwright Victorien Sardou and the other members of the Société des Gens de Lettres, including Georges Feydeau, Edmond Rostand, Ludovic Halévy, and Jean Richepin. Her work on their behalf included securing suitable translations, sound productions with leading actors, and full royalties. She also represented George Bernard Shaw, James M. Barrie (whom she prevailed upon to rewrite The Little Minister for Maude Adams), Hall Caine, and Jerome K. Jerome, among British authors, and Rachel Crothers and Clyde Fitch among Americans.

Her office thus became a center of the New York theatrical business, and for many years Marbury worked closely with Charles Frohman and his Theatrical Syndicate in bringing order to a rapidly expanding field of enterprise. She later worked with the rival Shubert Brothers' organization. In both cases this drew criticism from those who fought the de facto monopoly held by these "Theater Trusts", particularly from the noted American actress Minnie Maddern Fiske, who unsuccessfully struggled in the 1890s to form an actors union to fight the numerous fees and censorship imposed on actors and theater professionals by the Theater Trust.

In 1914, Marbury joined several other agents in forming the American Play Company, and she then turned to producing and helped stage Nobody Home (1915), Very Good, Eddie (1915), and Love O' Mike (1917), all with music by Jerome Kern, and See America First (1916) with music by Cole Porter. These works contributed significantly to the development of the characteristically American form of musical comedy. Marbury's other successes include bringing Vernon and Irene Castle, whom she had seen on one of her innumerable trips to Paris, to New York in 1913 and setting them up in a fashionable dancing school that was the springboard for their brief but spectacularly popular career.

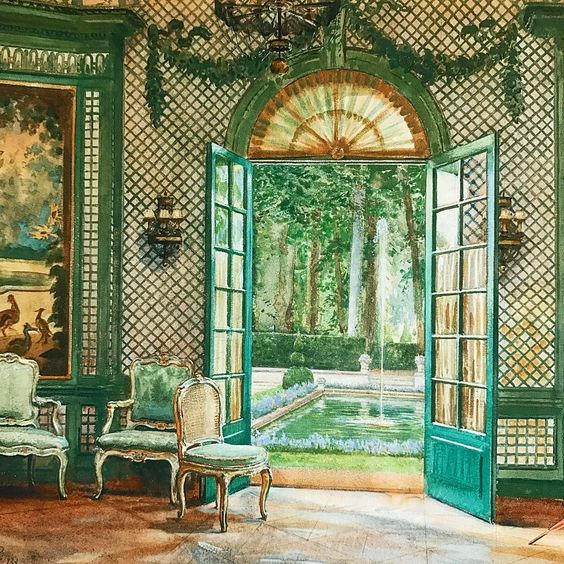
Interior of Elsie De Wolfe' music pavilion looking out on to the pool, The Villa Trianon, William Bruce Ellis Ranken

Marbury put her life story into a book My Crystal Ball, published in 1923. She had been told frequently that Hollywood would be interested – this during the Silent Film Era – in the story of her travels with her companions Anne Tracy Morgan (daughter of Jon Pierpont Morgan, the financier) and America's first interior designer, Elsie de Wolfe. Elizabeth convinced Miss Morgan to purchase the Villa Trianon in the town of Versailles, where the trio held court with Europe's elite and entertained with George Bernard Shaw and Oscar Wilde, two clients she represented theatrically in New York and London. After the German invasion of 1914, Anne, Elsie and Bess Marbury escaped in their Rolls-Royce convertible after packing hastily. In 1920, Marbury and De Wolfe hired architect Mott B. Schmidt to remodel and update their recently purchased Italianate style brownstone that had been built by Effingham Sutton in the 1870s on what was then known as Avenue A. Schmidt created a simple, elegant home with a French flair. In 1921 Marbury and de Wolfe's friends, Anne Morgan and Anne Vanderbilt also purchased brownstones on the same block, recently renamed Sutton Place, and once again Mott Schmidt was hired to transform the old Italianate houses into an elegant colonial and federal style home, respectively. Sutton Place quickly became a fashionable enclave. It was from their new residence at Sutton Place that Marbury began to work with the greatest musical talents of the time to dominate Broadway.

Before her death, Marbury chose her nephew John Marbury to produce a picture based on My Crystal Ball. The rights passed through John's estate to his son, the late New York sculptor Peter Marbury. The rights passed to Peter Marbury's widow, Diana Marbury, a New York theatrical producer, director and actress.

== Social life ==
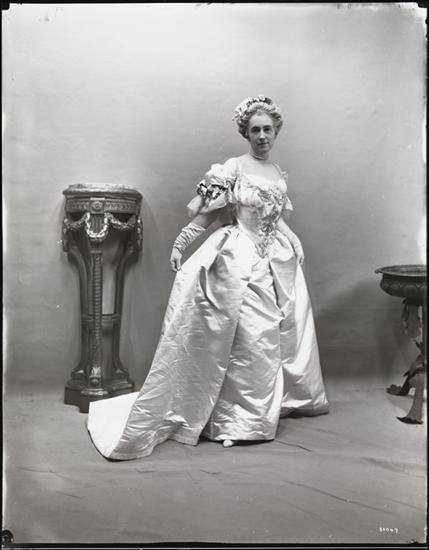
Elsie de Wolfe, James Hazen Hyde Ball, January 31, 1905

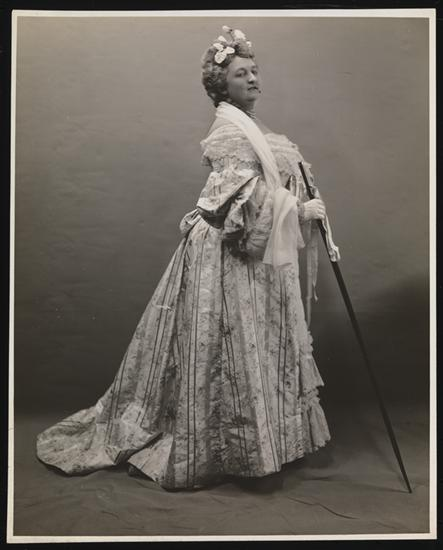
Bessie Marbury, James Hazen Hyde Ball, January 31, 1905

On the domestic front, Marbury was instrumental in assisting her romantic partner, Elsie de Wolfe, in creating a career in interior decoration and in 1903 restoring Villa Trianon in Versailles, France, where she, de Wolfe, and Anne Tracy Morgan (youngest child of the powerful financier, J.P. Morgan) held court and became noted hostesses, affectionately referred to as "The Versailles Triumvirate". In 1903, along with Morgan and Anne Harriman Vanderbilt, Marbury helped organize the Colony Club, the first women's social club in New York. This also served as de Wolfe's professional debut as interior decorator. This same coterie would go on to create the exclusive neighborhood of Sutton Place, along Manhattan's East River, which prompted gossip papers of the 1920s to loudly whisper of an "Amazon Enclave".

During World War I, Marbury devoted much time to relief work for French and later American soldiers, and spent several months in France working in military hospitals and giving talks to the troops. She translated Maurice Barrès's The Faith of France (1918) and was decorated by the French and Belgian governments, although she was notably disappointed to not be awarded by the French Legion of Honor, an honor given to de Wolfe for her work in the pioneering Ambrine Mission for Burn Victims. De Wolfe announced her wedding to Sir Charles Mendl, a British diplomat in 1926, after at least thirty years of living with Marbury. According to biographies of de Wolfe, the Mendl-de Wolfe marriage was platonic, with the couple keeping separate apartments in Paris and usually only appearing together at social functions. Both de Wolfe and Mendel assured an understandably enraged Marbury that the marriage was purely one of convenience. Weeks after the marriage, de Wolfe traveled to New York to reconcile with Marbury. Their relationship lasted another seven years until Marbury's death in 1933.

== Political life ==
Marbury was an active Democrat and served as Democratic National Committeewomen from New York during the 1924 presidential election. She was also mentioned as a potential candidate for vice president on the 1924 Democratic ticket.

== Catalog ==
=== Books ===
- Marbury, Elisabeth (1923). My Crystal Ball:Reminiscences. Boni and Liveright.
- Marbury, Elisabeth (1888). Manners;: A handbook of social customs. Cassell & company, limited.

=== Productions under aegis of Elisabeth Marbury ===
- Electra, revival, produced with Elisabeth Marbury, December 26, 1930, to January 1931
- Say When, original musical-comedy, produced by Elisabeth Marbury, June 26, 1928, to July 1928
- Revue Russe, original musical revue, produced by Elisabeth Marbury, October 5, 1922, to October 22, 1922
- Girl o' Mine, original musical-comedy, produced by Elisabeth Marbury, January 28, 1918, to March 9, 1918
- Love O' Mike, original musical-comedy, produced by Elisabeth Marbury, January 15, 1917, to September 29, 1917
- See America First, original musical, produced by Elisabeth Marbury, March 28, 1916, to April 8, 1916
- Very Good Eddie, original musical, produced by Marbury-Comstock Co., December 23, 1915 to October 14, 1916
- Our Children, original play, produced with Elisabeth Marbury, September 10, 1915, to September 1915
- Nobody Home, original play with music, produced by Elisabeth Marbury, April 20, 1915, to August 7, 1915
- Merry Gotham, original play, written by Elisabeth Marbury, March 14, 1892, to April 1892
