= Esmonde =

Esmonde may refer to:

== People ==
Given name

- Esmonde Higgins (1897-1960), Australian communist

Surname

- Sir Anthony Esmonde, 15th Baronet (1899-1981), an Irish politician and farmer
- Eugene Esmonde (1909-1942), a British aviator
- John Esmonde (disambiguation), various people
- Sir John Esmonde, 14th Baronet (1893-1958), an Irish politician
- Sir John Esmonde, 16th Baronet (1928-1987), an Irish politician
- John Gilbert Esmonde (1937-2008), a British television scriptwriter who was part of the duo of Esmonde and Larbey
- John Joseph Esmonde (1862-1915), an Irish politician
- Laurence Esmonde (disambiguation), various people
- Laurence Esmonde, Lord Esmonde (1570?-1646)
- Sir Osmond Esmonde, 12th Baronet (1896-1936), an Irish diplomat and politician
- Thomas Esmonde (disambiguation), various people
- Sir Thomas Esmonde, 11th Baronet (1862-1935), an Irish politician

== Titles ==
- Baron Esmonde, a title in the Peerage of Ireland
- Esmonde baronets, a title in the Baronetage of Ireland

== Places ==
- Esmonde, a community in Bonnechere Valley, Ontario, in Canada

== See also ==
- Esmond (disambiguation)
