= John Esmonde =

John Esmonde may refer to:

- John Esmonde (1937–2008), of the comedy scriptwriting duo Esmonde and Larbey
- Several members of the family of the Esmonde baronets of Clonegall, a title in the Baronetcy of Ireland, including:
  - Sir John Esmonde, 5th Baronet (died 1758)
  - Dr John Esmonde (United Irishman), briefly 7th Baronet, (died by hanging 1798)
  - Sir John Esmonde, 10th Baronet (1826–1876), MP for County Waterford 1852–1876
  - Sir John Esmonde, 14th Baronet (1893–1958), Fine Gael TD for Wexford 1937–1951
  - Sir John Esmonde, 16th Baronet (1928–1987), Fine Gael TD for Wexford 1973–1977
- John Joseph Esmonde (1862–1915), MP for North Tipperary 1910–1915, nephew of Sir John Esmonde, 10th Baronet
