= Thomas Esmonde =

Thomas Esmonde may refer to:

- Thomas Esmonde (VC) (1829–1872), Irish recipient of the Victoria Cross
- Sir Thomas Esmonde, 1st Baronet (died c. 1665), of the Esmonde baronets
- Sir Thomas Esmonde, 8th Baronet (died 1803), of the Esmonde baronets
- Sir Thomas Esmonde, 9th Baronet (1786–1868), MP for Wexford Borough
- Sir Thomas Esmonde, 11th Baronet (1862–1935), Irish MP and Senator
- Sir Thomas Francis Grattan Esmonde, 17th Baronet (born 1960), of the Esmonde baronets
