= Tipperary North =

Tipperary North may refer to:

- North Tipperary, a former county in Ireland
- Tipperary North (Dáil constituency), a former parliamentary constituency represented in Dáil Éireann
- Tipperary North (UK Parliament constituency), a UK Parliament constituency in Ireland
