= Laurence Esmonde =

Laurence Esmonde may refer to:

- Laurence Esmonde, 1st Baron Esmonde (1570?–1646), Irish peer
- Sir Laurence Esmonde, 2nd Baronet (died 1688), of the Esmonde baronets
- Sir Laurence Esmonde, 3rd Baronet (died c. 1717), of the Esmonde baronets
- Sir Laurence Esmonde, 4th Baronet (died 1738), of the Esmonde baronets
- Sir Laurence Grattan Esmonde, 13th Baronet (1863–1943), of the Esmonde baronets
