= Patrick Joseph O'Brien =

Irish politician

Member of Parliament for North Tipperary
- In office 1885–1906
- Preceded by: New seat

Personal details
- Born: 1835 Nenagh, County Tipperary
- Died: 10 January 1911 (aged 75–76)
- Party: Irish Nationalist
- Spouse: Bridget

Patrick Joseph O'Brien (1835 – 10 January 1911) was an Irish Nationalist Member of Parliament for North Tipperary, 1885–1906.

He was the only son of James O'Brien of Nenagh, County Tipperary and of Bridget, daughter of John Gunning Regan. He was educated at local schools and became a hotel proprietor. In 1878 he married Bridget, daughter of Denis Hayes of Ballintoher, Nenagh. He was chairman of the Nenagh Town Commissioners, 1880–87 and 1890–91, and first Catholic Chairman of the Nenagh Board of Guardians, 1885–99. In 1882 he was arrested as a suspect and confined in Naas gaol. Later he was a County Councillor, and Chairman of the District Council, 1899–1900.

He was elected to represent the new seat of North Tipperary, in which Nenagh was situated, in 1885, defeating the Conservative candidate by a margin of 19 to one. He was then returned unopposed in 1886. When the Irish Parliamentary Party split over the leadership of Charles Stewart Parnell in December 1890, O'Brien joined the Anti-Parnellites. In the 1892 general election he was opposed by a Unionist candidate but won by a margin of almost nine to one. Thereafter he was returned unopposed for North Tipperary until he retired at the general election of 1906 owing to failing eyesight. He died on 10 January 1911.

== Sources ==
Michael Stenton and Stephen Lees, Who’s Who of British Members of Parliament, Vol.2 1886–1918, Sussex, Harvester Press, 1978

The Times (London), 11 January 1911

Brian M. Walker (ed.), Parliamentary Election Results in Ireland, 1801-1922, Dublin, Royal Irish Academy, 1978

Parliament of the United Kingdom
New constituency	Member of Parliament for North Tipperary; 1885 – 1906	Succeeded by Michael Hogan
