= Royal Irish Regiment (1684–1922) =

18th Regiment of Foot 18th (Royal Irish) Regiment of Foot Royal Irish Regiment
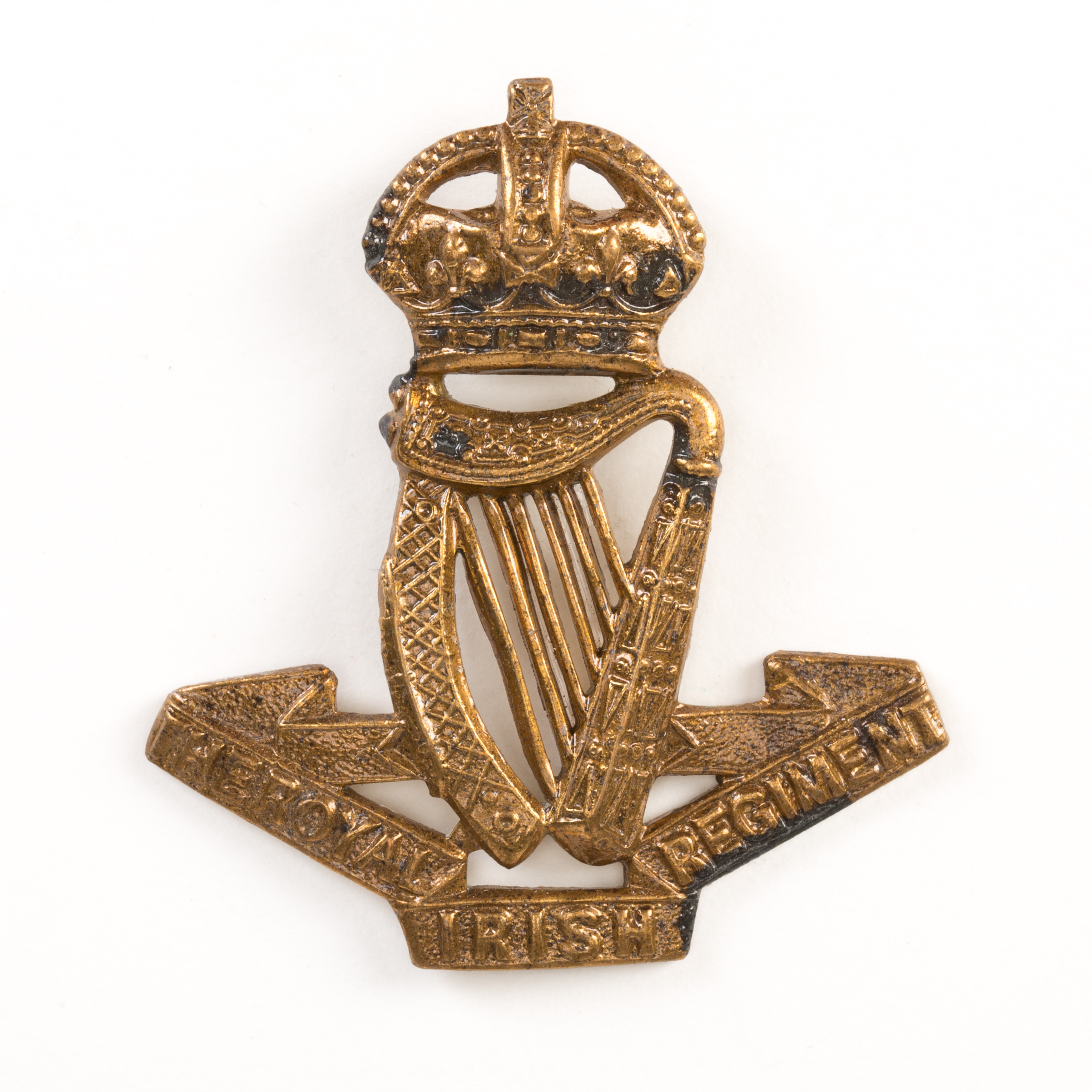
- Royal Irish Regiment Cap Badge
- Active: 1684–1922
- Disbanded: 1922
- Country: Kingdom of Ireland (1684–1800); United Kingdom of Great Britain and Ireland (1801–1922)
- Branch: British Army
- Type: Infantry
- Role: Line infantry
- Size: 2 Regular battalions 3 Militia and Special Reserve battalions 6 Hostilities-Only battalions
- Garrison/HQ: Kickham Barracks, Clonmel
- Nicknames: The Namurs, Paddy's Blackguards
- Motto: Virtutis Namurcensis Praemium (Reward for Valour at Namur)
- Colors: Royal Blue
- March: Quick: Garry Owen
- Engagements: Second Boer War

The Royal Irish Regiment, until 1881 the 18th Regiment of Foot, was an infantry regiment of the line in the British Army, first raised in 1684. Also known as the 18th (Royal Irish) Regiment of Foot and the 18th (The Royal Irish) Regiment of Foot, it was one of eight Irish regiments raised largely in Ireland, its home depot in Clonmel. It saw service for two and a half centuries before being disbanded with the Partition of Ireland following establishment of the independent Irish Free State in 1922 when the five regiments that had their traditional recruiting grounds in the counties of the new state were disbanded.

== History ==
=== Formation to end 19th century ===
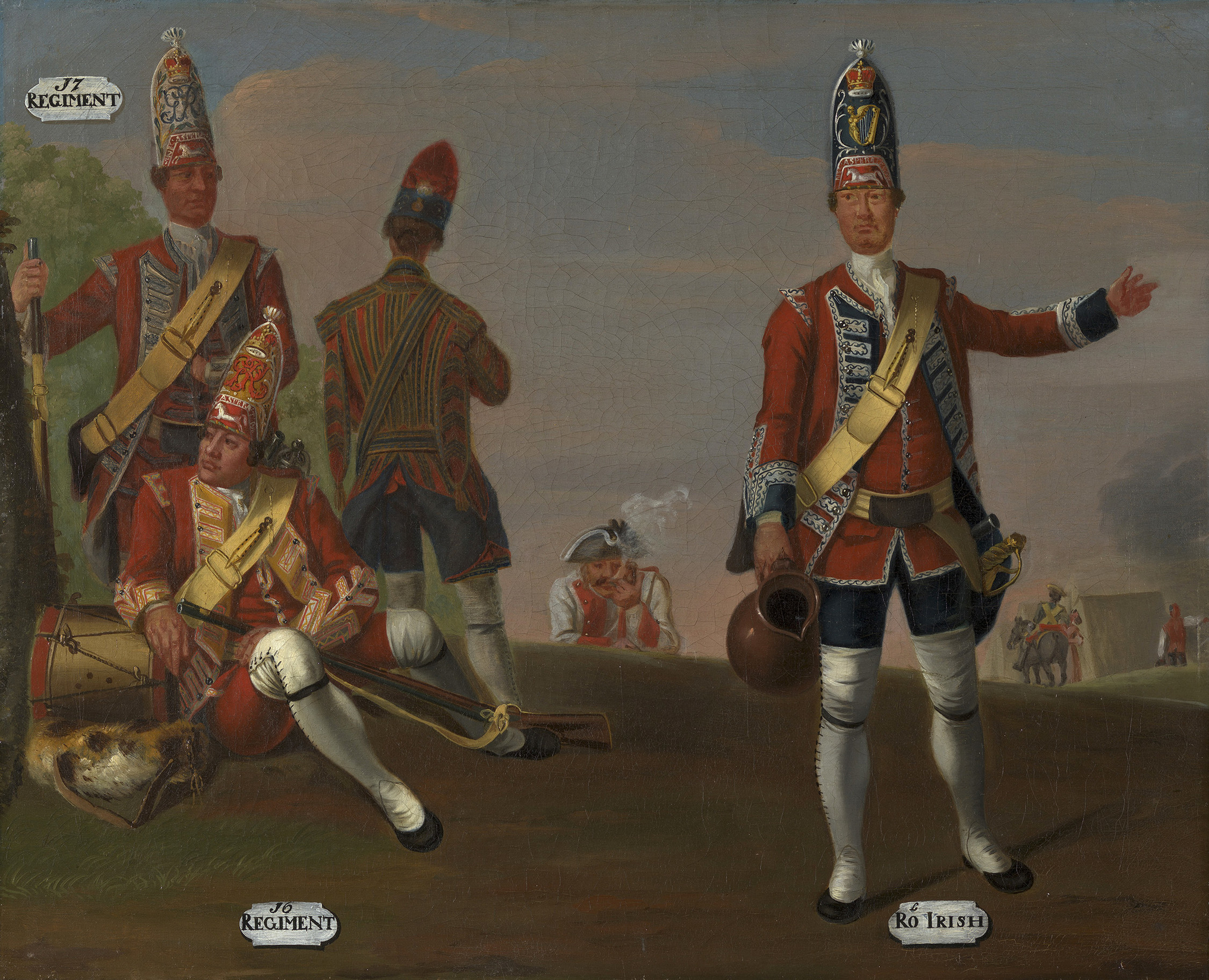
c. 1751 painting of a regimental grenadier (right)

The regiment was formed in 1684 by the Earl of Granard from independent companies in Ireland. As Hamilton's Foot, it served in Flanders during the Nine Years War and at Namur on 31 August 1695, took part in the capture of the Terra Nova earthwork, later commemorated in the song 'The British Grenadiers.' In recognition, of this, William III renamed the unit as The Royal Regiment of Foot of Ireland.

As part of the Irish establishment, it escaped disbandment after the 1697 Treaty of Ryswick and when the War of the Spanish Succession began in 1701, returned to Flanders as part of Marlborough's field army. It served there throughout the war, including major actions at Schellenberg, Blenheim, Ramillies, Oudenarde and Malplaquet.

The war ended with the 1713 Peace of Utrecht and in 1718, the regiment joined the garrison of the British-held island of Menorca, where it remained here until 1742, with the exception of a detachment sent to Gibraltar in 1727. The regiment spent most of the next 25 years on garrison duty in Britain and Ireland; in 1751, reforms ended the tradition of naming units after their current colonel and the regiment was officially ranked as the 18th Regiment of Foot.

Based in Ireland for most of the Seven Years' War, in July 1767 it arrived in North America and spent the next eight years on garrison duty in Philadelphia and different parts of Illinois. When the American War of Independence began in April 1775, most of the unit was in Boston; for the first time in over 50 years, it saw action at Lexington, Concord and Bunker Hill. Boston was abandoned in early 1776 and the regiment evacuated to Nova Scotia, where many of its men were drafted into other units, then to Dover Castle in England.

In 1782, it moved to Guernsey where in 1783 it helped the local militia put down a mutiny by soldiers of the 104th Regiment based at Fort George. The Government of Guernsey publicly thanked both units and awarded them a cash bounty of 100 guineas. After this, the unit returned to Gibraltar later in the year, where it remained until the Siege of Toulon in 1793 during the French Revolutionary Wars.

=== 19th century ===
Regimental troops at the Battle of Amoy

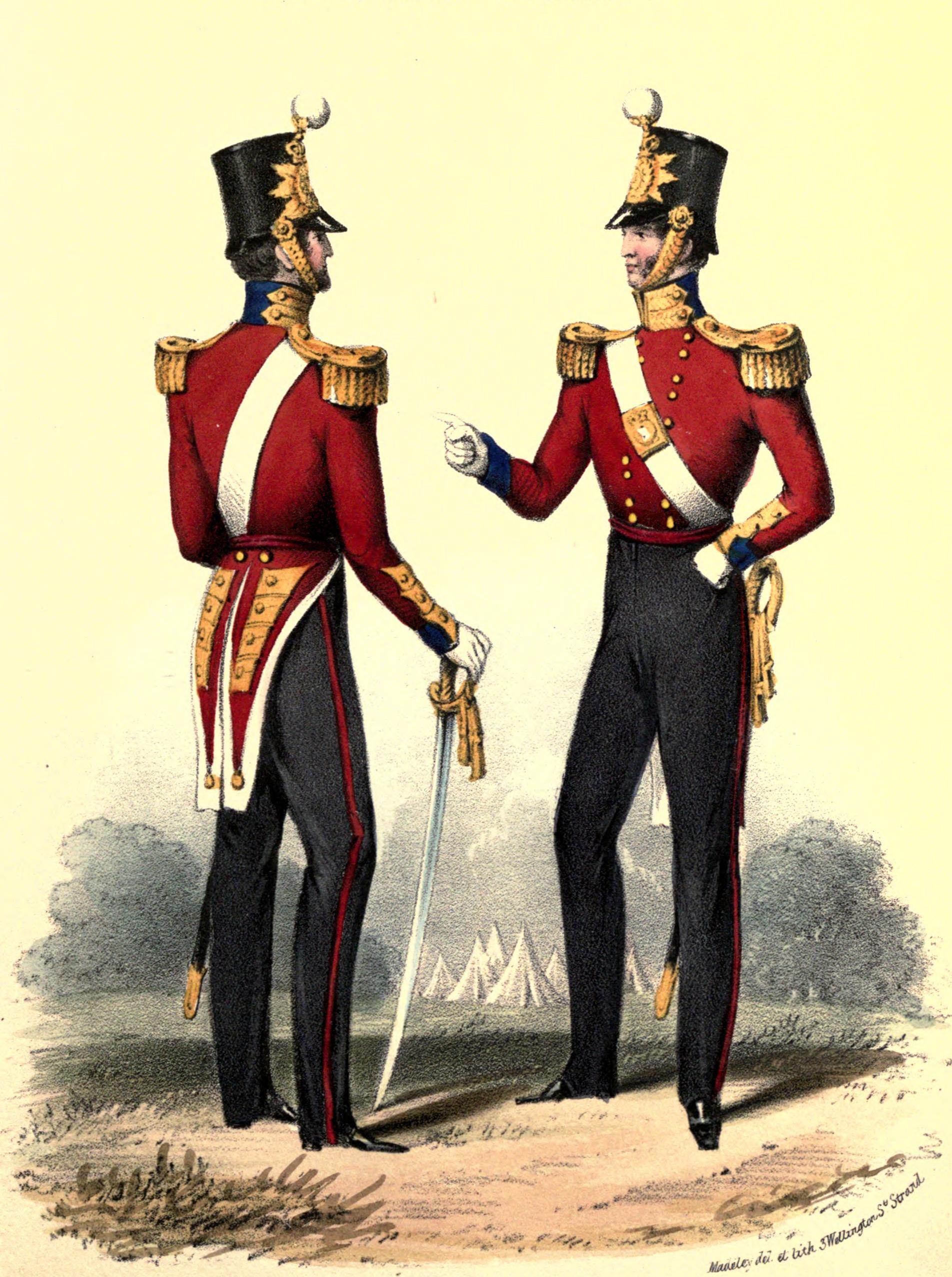
1848 illustration of two regimental officers

Regimental troops storming the Shwedagon Pagoda on 12 April 1852

The regiment also saw action at the Battle of Alexandria in March 1801. The 1st Battalion served in Jamaica and the 2nd Battalion served in Curaçao during the Napoleonic Wars.

On 19 November 1807, 120 troops of the 18th Foot were drowned when HM Packet Ship Prince of Wales sank in Dublin Bay. They were buried at Merrion Cemetery, Bellevue. During the First Opium War in China, the regiment next saw action at the Capture of Chusan in July 1840, Battle of Canton in May 1841, Battle of Amoy in August 1841, Second Capture of Chusan in October 1841, Battle of Ningpo in March 1842, Battle of Tzeki in March 1842, Battle of Chapu in May 1842, Battle of Woosung in June 1842, and Battle of Chinkiang in July 1842. It took part in the Siege of Sevastopol during the Crimean War; Captain Thomas Esmonde was awarded the Victoria Cross for saving a party of colleagues from a fire of shell and grape. The regiment also took part in the Second Anglo-Afghan War.

The 2nd Battalion, which was re-formed on 18 September 1857, began to arrive in New Zealand from 4 July 1863 and served in the Waikato and Taranaki campaigns of the New Zealand Wars. Captain Hugh Shaw won the Victoria Cross when he rescued wounded soldiers during a skirmish at Nukumaru near Whanganui.

The regiment was not fundamentally affected by the Cardwell Reforms of the 1870s, which gave it a depot at Victoria Barracks in Clonmel from 1873, or by the Childers reforms of 1881 – as it already possessed two battalions, there was no need for it to amalgamate with another regiment. Under the reforms the regiment became The Royal Irish Regiment on 1 July 1881. It served as the county regiment of Tipperary, Waterford, Wexford and Kilkenny. Militarily, the whole of Ireland was administered as a separate command within the United Kingdom with Command Headquarters at Parkgate (Phoenix Park) Dublin, directly under the War Office in London.

The 1st Battalion was stationed in British India and Afghanistan from 1875 to 1884, when it were transferred to Egypt to take part in the Nile Expedition. It was back in home barracks from 1885 to 1891, then in Ireland until it was sent to South Africa as part of reinforcements for the Second Boer War in late 1899. The battalion took part in several battles, and played an important role at the Battle of Slabbert's Nek in July 1900 during the war.

The 2nd Battalion saw action in Egypt during the Anglo-Egyptian War in 1882. From 1884 it was stationed at Malta, then in India where it had various postings, including the last in Kamptee until it returned home in late 1902.

In 1908, the Volunteers and Militia were reorganised nationally, with the former becoming the Territorial Force and the latter the Special Reserve; the regiment now had two Reserve but no Territorial battalions.

=== First World War ===
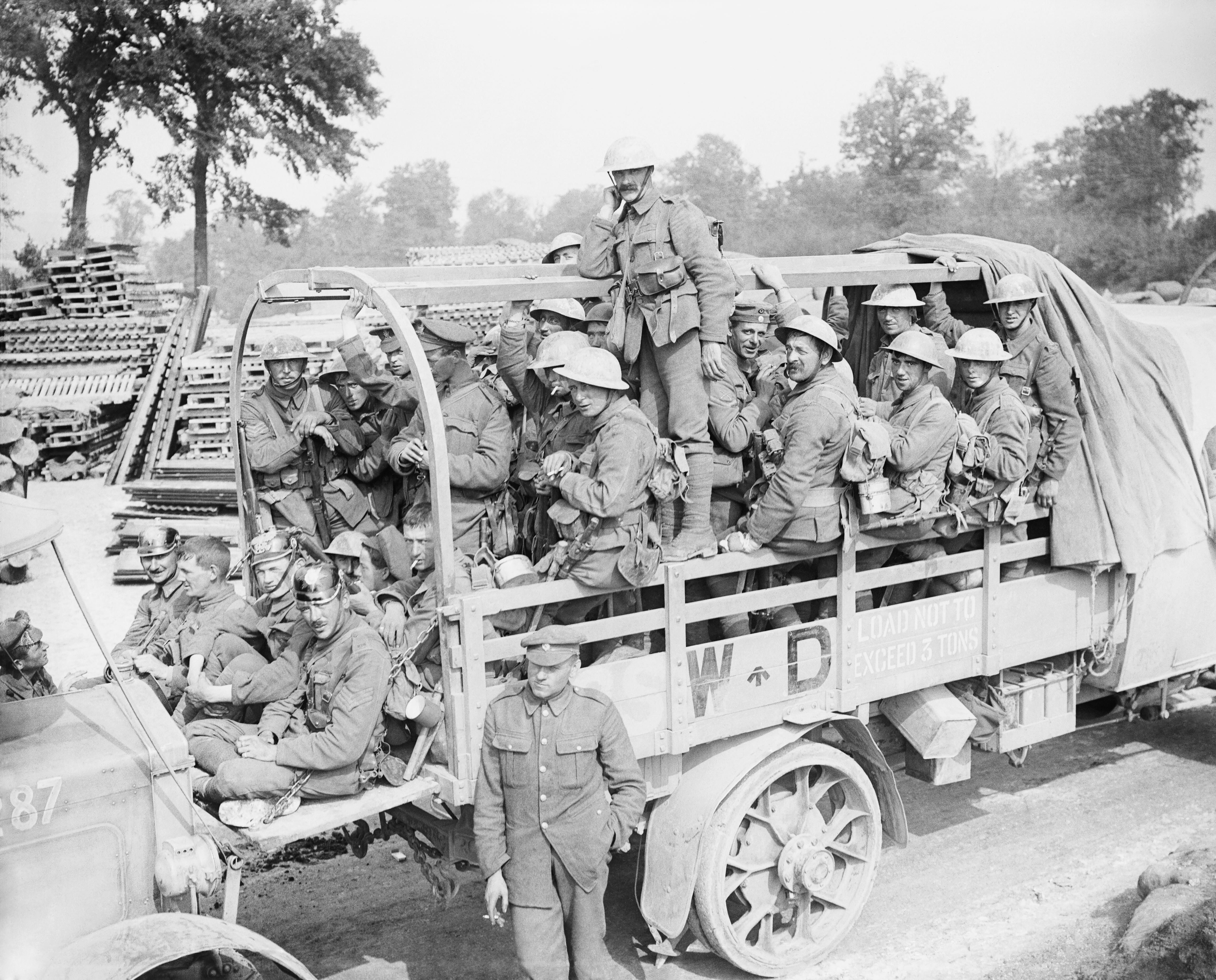
Men of the 16th Irish Division in a lorry going back for a rest after taking Guillemont, 3 September 1916. Two soldiers clearly display badges of the Royal Irish Regiment.

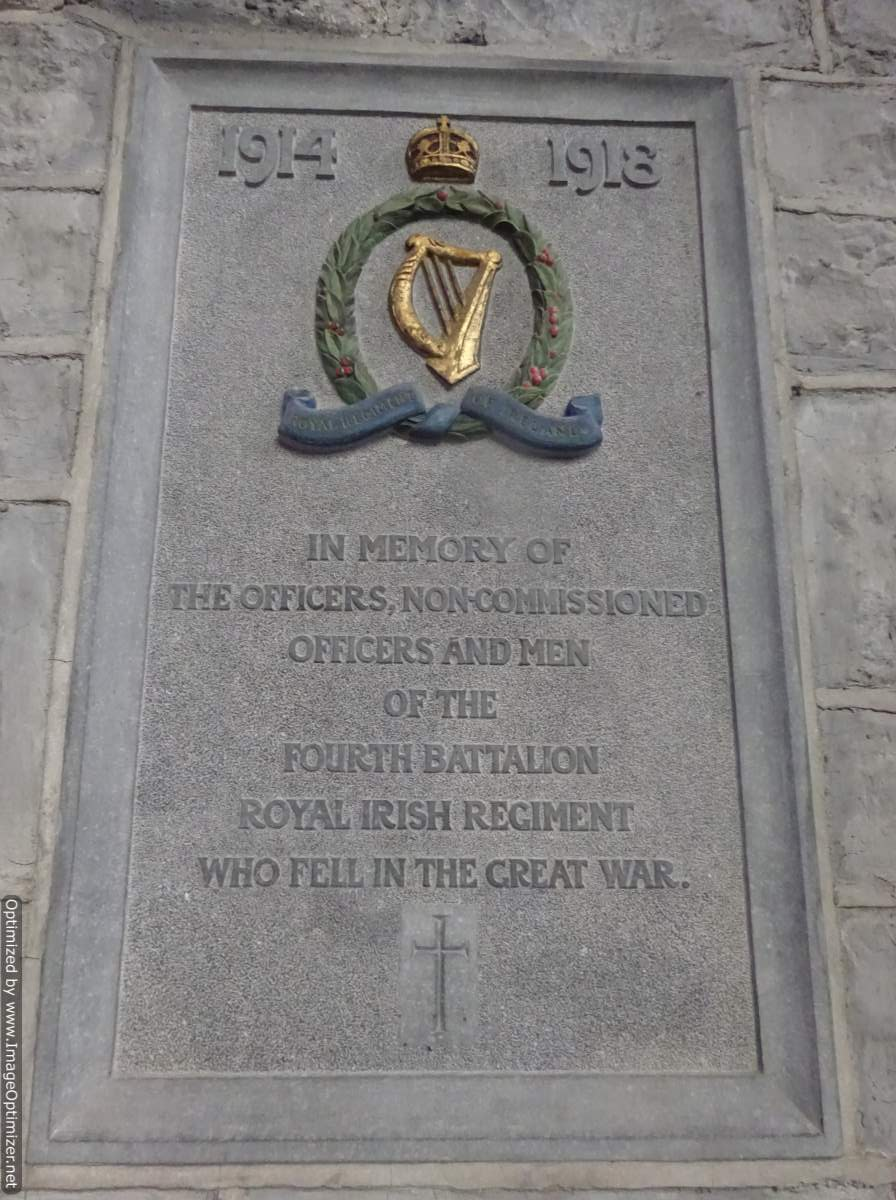
Memorial for the war dead of the 4th (Extra Reserve) Battalion, Royal Irish Regiment.

==== Regular Army ====
The 1st Battalion landed at Le Havre as part of the 82nd Brigade in the 27th Division in December 1914 for service on the Western Front but moved to Salonika in November 1915.

The 2nd Battalion landed at Boulogne-sur-Mer as part of the 8th Brigade in the 3rd Division in August 1914 for service on the Western Front but was almost completely destroyed at the Battle of La Bassée in October 1914 with many men being taken as prisoners of war. The battalion was re-formed in October 1914 and, as part of the 22nd Infantry Brigade in the 7th Division saw further action at the Battle of the Somme, when it was involved in capturing three miles of the German frontline trenches, in Autumn 1916.

The 3rd (Reserve) Battalion, largely made up from local Dubliners, were the first army troops to engage the Irish rebels during the Easter Rising: the rebels were fighting to establish an Irish Republic in Dublin. Eight of the Royal Irish Regiment were killed and sixteen more wounded. Some of these are buried in Grangegorman Military Cemetery. A Royal Irish Regiment officer reported that "they regarded, not unreasonably, everyone they saw as an enemy, and fired at anything that moved".

==== New Armies ====
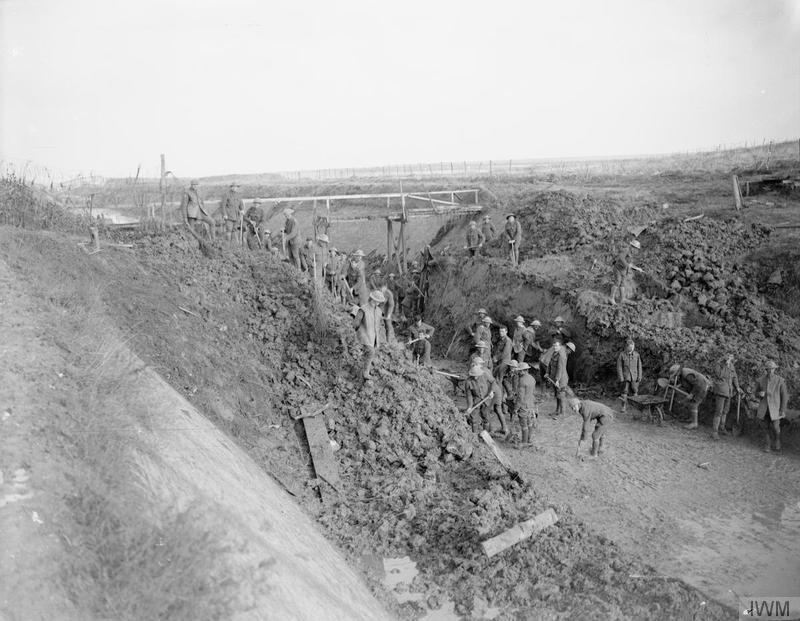
A working party from a battalion of the Royal Irish Regiment cleaning up a section of the Canal du Nord near Moeuvres, 28 November 1917.

The 5th (Service) Battalion (Pioneers) landed in Suvla Bay as the pioneer battalion for the 10th (Irish) Division in August 1915 but moved to Salonika in September 1915.

The 6th (Service) Battalion landed at Le Havre as part of the 47th Infantry Brigade in the 16th (Irish) Division in December 1915 for service on the Western Front.

The 7th (South Irish Horse) Battalion was formed in France as part of the 49th Infantry Brigade in the 16th (Irish) Division from the dismounted 1st and 2nd South Irish Horse in September 1917.

=== Disbandment ===
Due to substantial defence cuts and the establishment of the Irish Free State in 1922, it was agreed that the six former Southern Ireland regiments would be disbanded, including the Royal Irish Regiment. On 12 June, five regimental colours were laid up in a ceremony at St George's Hall, Windsor Castle in the presence of HM King George V. The six regiments were then all disbanded on 31 July 1922. With the simultaneous outbreak of the Irish Civil War conflict some thousands of their ex-servicemen and officers contributed to expanding the Free State government's newly formed National Army. They brought considerable combat experience with them and by May 1923 comprised 50 per cent of its 53,000 soldiers and 20 per cent of its officers.

== Battle honours ==
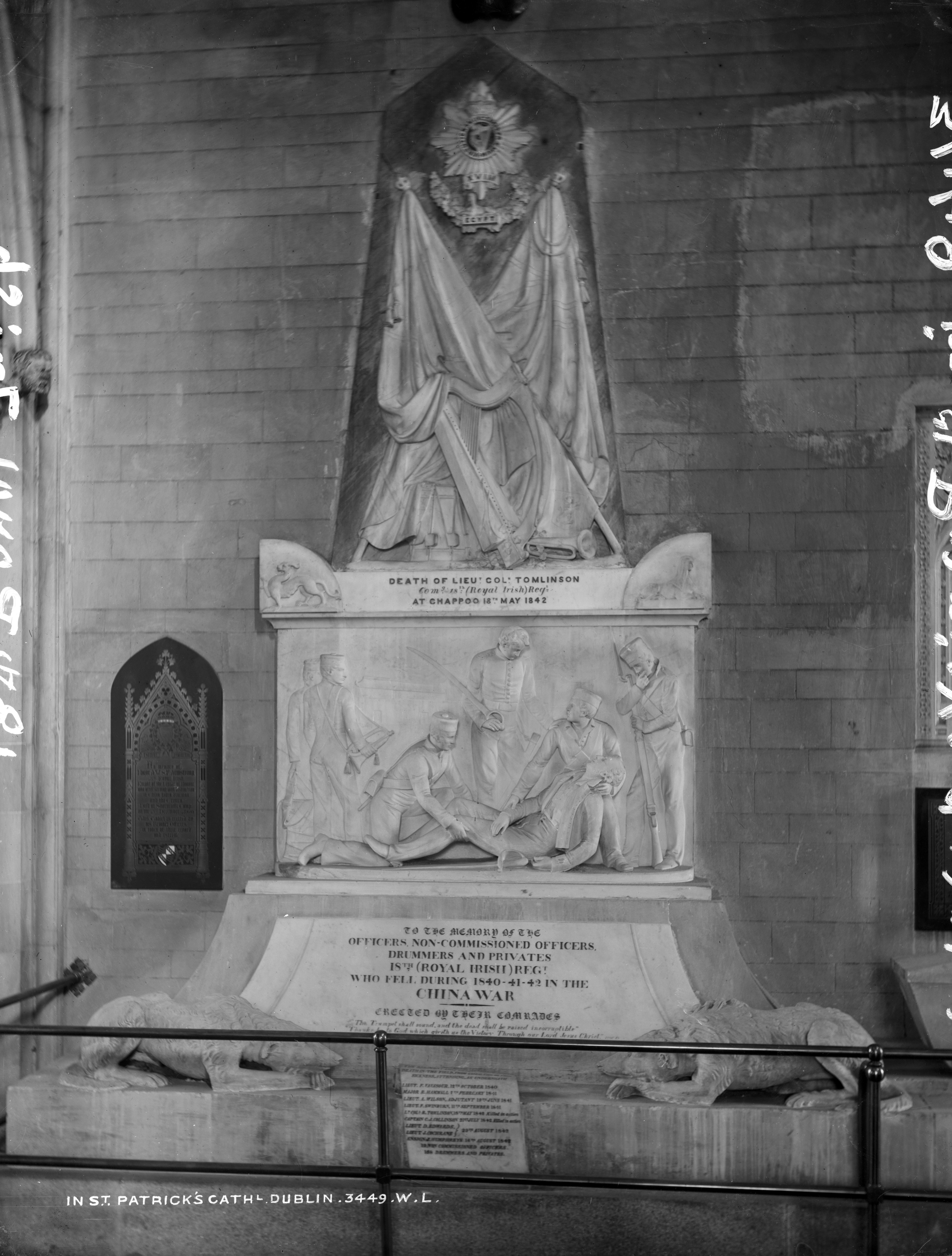
Royal Irish Regiment memorial in St Patrick's Cathedral, Dublin, c.1900

The battle honours of the regiment were:

- Early Wars: Namur 1695, Blenheim, Ramillies, Oudenarde, Malplaquet, Egypt, China, Pegu, Sevastopol, New Zealand, Afghanistan (1879–80), Tel-el-Kebir, Egypt 1882, Nile (1884–85), South Africa (1900–02)
- The Great War: Mons, Le Cateau, Retreat from Mons, Marne 1914, Aisne 1914, La Bassée 1914, Ypres 1915 '17 '18, Gravenstafel, St Julien, Frezenberg, Bellewaarde, Somme 1916 '18, Albert 1916 '18, Bazentin, Delville Wood, Guillemont, Ginchy, Messines 1917, Pilckem, Langemarck 1917, St. Quentin, Rosières, Arras 1918, Drocourt-Quéant, Hindenburg Line, Canal du Nord, St Quentin Canal, Beaurevoir, Cambrai 1918, Courtrai, France and Flanders 1914–18, Struma, Macedonia 1915–17, Suvla, Landing at Suvla, Gallipoli 1915, Gaza, Jerusalem, Tell 'Asur, Megiddo, Nablus, Palestine 1917–18

== Victoria Crosses ==
The following members of the regiment were awarded the Victoria Cross:

- Captain Thomas Esmonde, Crimean War
- Captain Hugh Shaw, New Zealand Wars
- Private John Barry, Second Boer War
- Private (Acting Lance-Corporal) Frederick George Room, First World War

== Great War memorials ==
The following are memorials of the Great War (World War I):

- Irish National War Memorial Gardens, Dublin.
- Island of Ireland Peace Park Messines, Belgium.
- Ulster Tower Memorial Thiepval, France.
- Menin Gate Memorial Ypres, Belgium.
- Regimental Cross, La Bascule, Mons

== Colonels ==
The colonels of the regiment were:

Earl of Granard's Regiment of Foot

- 1684–1686: Lt-Gen. The 1st Earl of Granard
- 1686–1688: Col. Viscount Forbes (The 2nd Earl of Granard from 1696)
- 1688–1689: Col. Sir John Edgeworth
- 1689–1692: Col. The 4th Earl of Meath
- 1692–1705: Major-Gen. Frederick Hamilton

Royal Regiment of Foot of Ireland - (1695)

- 1705–1712: Lt-Gen. Richard Ingoldsby
- 1712–1717: Brig-Gen. Robert Stearne
- 1717–1732: Brig-Gen. William Cosby
- 1732–1735: Brig-Gen. Sir Charles Hotham, 5th Baronet
- 1735–1742: Major-Gen. John Armstrong
- 1742–1747: Gen. Sir John Mordaunt KB
- 1747–1762: Lt-Gen. John Folliott

18th (The Royal Irish) Regiment of Foot - (1751)

- 1762–1794: Gen. Sir John Sebright, 6th Baronet
- 1794–1811: Gen. Sir James Pulteney, 7th Bt
- 1811–1832: Gen. The 2nd Earl of Donoughmore (he was styled as The 1st Baron Hutchinson up until 1825), KB
- 1832–1850: Gen. The 5th Baron Aylmer, GCB
- 1850–1877: F.M. Sir John Forster FitzGerald GCB
- 1877–1882: Lt-Gen. Clement Alexander Edwards CB

The Royal Irish Regiment - (1881)

- 1882–1886: Gen. Sir Alexander Macdonell KCB
- 1886–1889: Gen. Sir Richard Denis Kelly KCB
- 1889–1895: Gen. George Frederick Stevenson Call CB
- 1895: Lt-Gen. Walter McLeod Fraser
- 1895–1897: Lt-Gen. Sir Henry Marshman Havelock-Allan, Bt, VC, GCB
- 1897–1918: Major-Gen. Charles Frederick Gregorie, CB
- 1918–1922: Major-Gen. John Burton Forster CB

== Sources ==
- Baule, Steven (2013). Protecting the Empire's Frontier: Officers of the 18th (Royal Irish) Regiment of Foot During Its North American Service, 1767–1776 (PDF). Ohio University Press. ISBN 9780821420553. Archived from the original (PDF) on 24 September 2016.
- Cannon, Richard (1848). Historical Record of the Eighteenth, or Royal Irish Regiment of Foot. London: Parker, Furnivall and Parker.
- Caulfield, Max (1995). The Easter Rebellion: The Outstanding Narrative History of the 1916 Rising in Ireland. Roberts Rinehart Publishers. ISBN 978-1570980428.
- Cottrell, Peter (2008). The Irish Civil War 1922–23. Osprey Publishing. ISBN 978-1-84603-270-7.
- Duncan, Jonathan (1841). The History of Guernsey with Occasional Notices of Jersey, Alderney and Sark and biographical sketches. Longman.
- Harris, Major Henry E. D. (1968). The Irish Regiments in the First World War. Mercer Press Cork. ISBN 978-0853420729.
- McGarry, Fearghal (2010). The Rising: Ireland, Easter 1916. Oxford University Press. ISBN 978-0-19-280186-9.
- Murphy, David (2007). Irish Regiments in the World Wars. Osprey Publishing. ISBN 978-1846030154.
