= Kickham Barracks =

Former military base in Clonmel, Ireland

- Dún Chiceam
- Clonmel
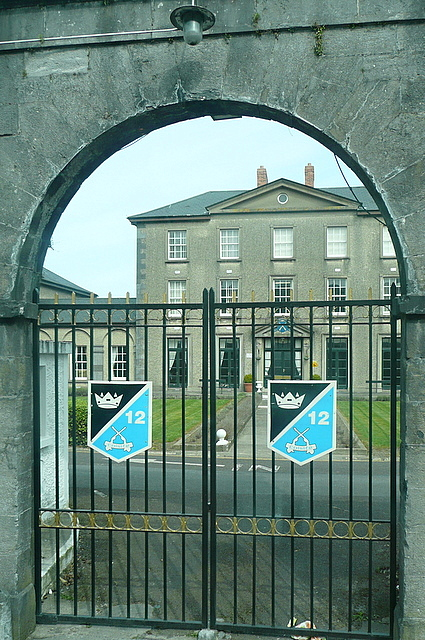
- Kickham Barracks

Site information
- Type: Barracks
- Operator: (Republic of Ireland) Irish Army

Location
- Location within Ireland
- Coordinates: 52.3550°N 7.6939°W

Site history
- Built: 1780-1782
- Built for: War Office
- In use: 1782-2012

Garrison information
- Occupants: Royal Irish Regiment

Kickham Barracks (Irish: Dún Chiceam) was a military installation in Clonmel, Ireland. Originally built as Clonmel Infantry Barracks, the barracks were constructed between 1780 and 1782. In 1837, the site was renamed Victoria Barracks in honour of Queen Victoria.

In 1873, a system of recruiting areas based on counties was instituted under the Cardwell Reforms and the barracks became the depot for the two battalions of the 18th (Royal Irish) Regiment of Foot. Following the Childers Reforms, the regiment evolved to become the Royal Irish Regiment with its depot in the barracks in 1881.

The Royal Irish Regiment was disbanded at the time of Irish Independence in 1922. The barracks were temporarily secured by the Irish Republican Army in 1922 but then handed over to the forces of the Irish Free State. They were then renamed Kickham Barracks after Charles Kickham, the Irish poet.

After a period of disuse, they were rebuilt as a base for the Irish Army between 1942 and 1945 and they then remained in use, latterly as the home of the 12th Infantry Battalion, until they closed in March 2012.

== See also ==
- List of Irish military installations
