= Hugh Shaw (British Army officer) =

Recipient of the Victoria Cross

Major-General Hugh Shaw VC CB
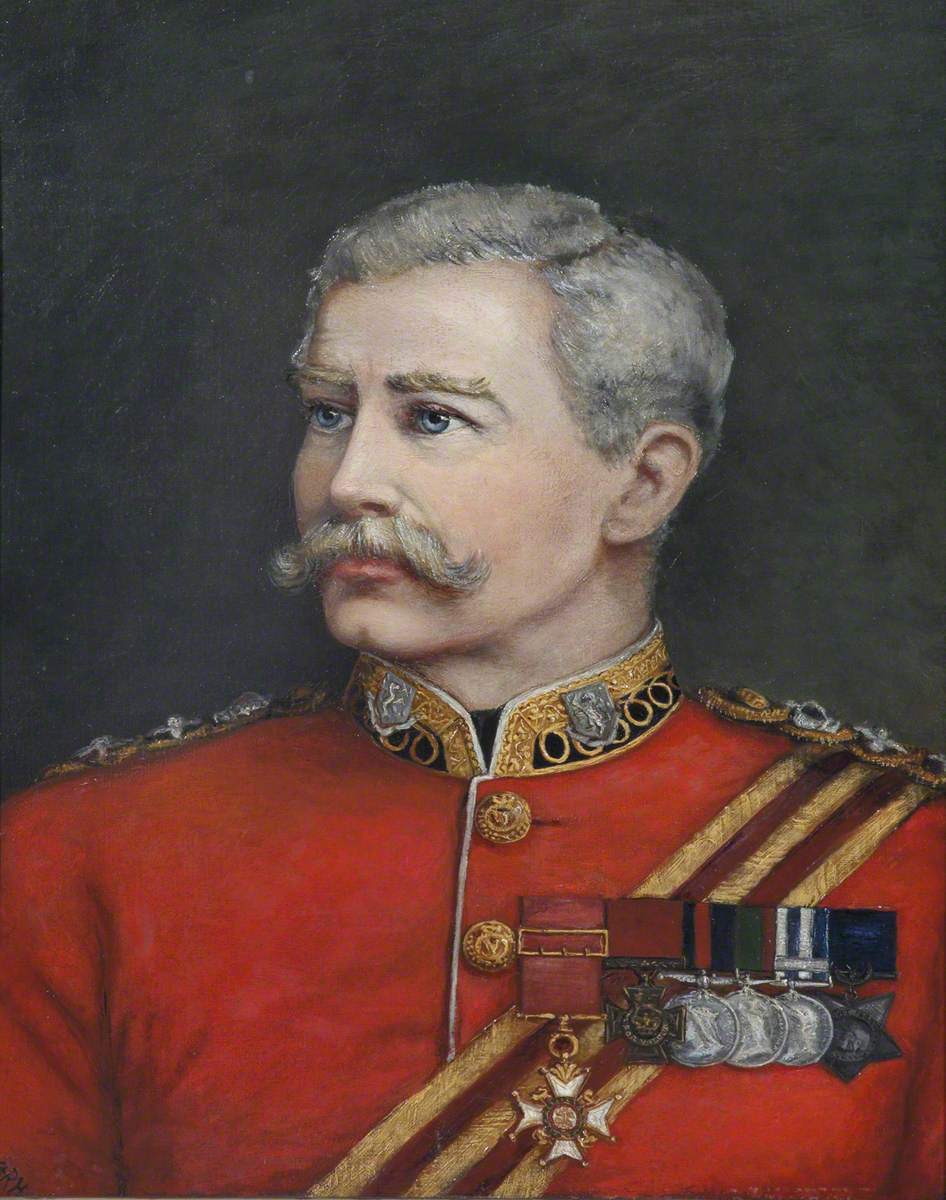
- Born: 4 February 1839; Madras, British India
- Died: 25 August 1904 (aged 65); Southsea, Hampshire, England
- Burial place: Highland Road Cemetery, Portsmouth
- Military career
- Allegiance: United Kingdom
- Branch: (United Kingdom of Great Britain and Ireland) British Army
- Service years: 1855–1887
- Rank: Major-General
- Units: 18th Regiment of Foot; Royal Irish Regiment
- Conflicts: Crimean War; Indian Mutiny; New Zealand Wars; Second Anglo-Afghan War; Mahdist War
- Awards: Victoria Cross; Companion of the Most Honourable Order of the Bath; New Zealand War Medal; Afghanistan Medal, 1878-80; Egypt Medal, 1882-89; Khedive's Star, 1882-91

Major-General Hugh Shaw VC CB (4 February 1839 – 25 August 1904) was a senior British Army officer and a recipient of the Victoria Cross, the highest award for gallantry in the face of the enemy that can be awarded to British and Commonwealth forces.

== Early life ==
Shaw was born in Madras, British India, on 4 February 1839, the son of James Shaw, an Inspector General of Hospitals in Madras, and Ann Hay. He married Emily Grace Sheffield on 21 June 1870.

== Victoria Cross ==
Shaw was 25 years old, and a captain in the 18th Regiment (later The Royal Irish Regiment), during the New Zealand Wars on 24 January 1865 when the following deed led to the award of the Victoria Cross:

For his gallant conduct at the skirmish near Nukumaru, in New Zealand, on the 24th of January last, in proceeding, under a heavy fire, with four Privates of the Regiment, who volunteered to accompany, him, to within 30 yards of the bush occupied by the Rebels, in order to carry off a comrade who was badly wounded. On the afternoon of that day, Captain Shaw was ordered to occupy a position about half a mile from the Camp. He advanced in skirmishing order, and, when about 30-yards from the bush, he deemed it prudent to retire to a palisade about 60 yards from the bush, as two of his party had been wounded. Finding that one of them was unable to move, he called for volunteers to advance to the front to carry the man to the rear, and the four Privates referred to accompanied him, under a heavy fire, to the place where the wounded man was lying, and they succeeded in bringing him to the rear.

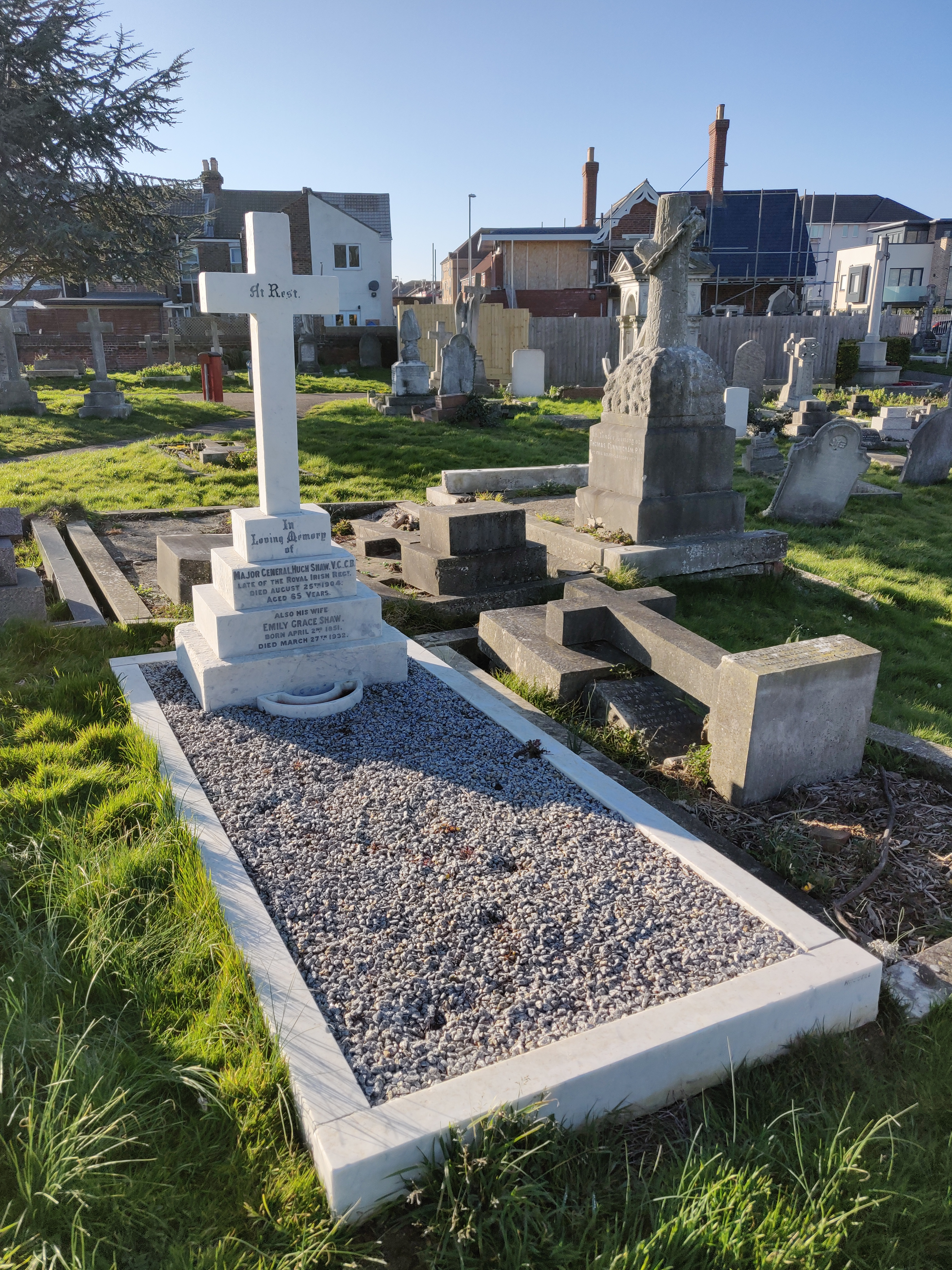
Grave of Hugh Shaw V.C.

He later achieved the rank of Major General. His Victoria Cross is displayed at the National Army Museum in Chelsea, London.
