= Frederick George Room =

Recipient of the Victoria Cross

- Born: 31 May 1895; Bristol, Gloucestershire
- Died: 19 January 1932 (aged 36); Bristol
- Burial place: Greenbank Cemetery, Bristol
- Military career
- Allegiance: United Kingdom
- Branch: British Army
- Rank: Lance-Corporal
- Units: The Royal Irish Regiment
- Conflicts: World War I
- Awards: Victoria Cross

Frederick George Room VC (31 May 1895 – 19 January 1932) was an English recipient of the Victoria Cross, the highest and most prestigious award for gallantry in the face of the enemy that can be awarded to British and Commonwealth forces.

== Early life ==
Frederick George Room was born in the Horfield suburb of Bristol, England.

== Victoria Cross ==
He was 22 years old, and an acting lance-corporal in the 2nd Battalion, The Royal Irish Regiment, British Army during the First World War when the following deed took place for which he was awarded the VC.

On 16 August 1917 at Frezenberg, Belgium, when the company which was holding a line of shell-holes and short trenches had many casualties, Lance-Corporal Room was in charge of the stretcher-bearers. He worked continuously under intense fire, dressing the wounded and helping to evacuate them. Throughout this period, with complete disregard for his own life, he showed unremitting devotion to his duties.

His Victoria Cross is displayed at the National Army Museum in Chelsea, London, England.

== Death ==
Room died at a hospital in Bristol on 19 January 1932, aged 36, following a long period of illness. He is buried at Greenbank Cemetery in Bristol.
