= Joseph MacDonagh =

Irish politician (1883–1922)

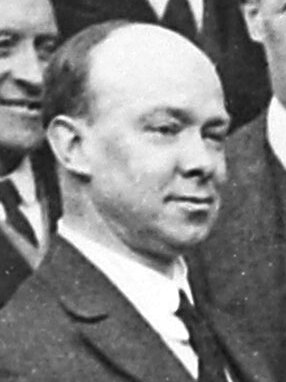
- MacDonagh in 1922

Teachta Dála
- In office May 1921 – 25 December 1922
- Constituency: Tipperary Mid, North and South
- In office December 1918 – May 1921
- Constituency: Tipperary North

Personal details
- Born: 18 May 1883 Cloughjordan, County Tipperary, Ireland
- Died: 25 December 1922 (aged 39) County Tipperary, Ireland
- Party: Sinn Féin
- Spouse: Margaret O'Toole (m. 1913)
- Children: 3
- Relatives: Thomas MacDonagh (brother); John MacDonagh (brother)
- Education: Rockwell College

British Army intelligence file for Joseph McDonagh

Joseph Michael MacDonagh (18 May 1883 – 25 December 1922) was an Irish Sinn Féin politician.

He was born in Cloughjordan, County Tipperary. His parents Joseph MacDonagh and Mary Parker were both national schoolteachers. His brothers included the executed 1916 Easter Rising leader Thomas MacDonagh and film director John MacDonagh. He was educated in his father's school in Cloughjordan, and at Rockwell College.

He was elected unopposed as a Sinn Féin MP for the Tipperary North constituency at the 1918 general election. In January 1919, Sinn Féin MPs refused to recognise the Parliament of the United Kingdom and instead assembled at the Mansion House in Dublin as a revolutionary parliament called Dáil Éireann, though MacDonagh did not attend as he was in prison. He was elected unopposed as a Sinn Féin Teachta Dála (TD) for the Tipperary Mid, North and South constituency at the 1921 elections. He also served as an alderman of Rathmines and Rathgar Urban District Council and Dublin Corporation between 1920 and 1922.

He was Director of the Belfast Boycott, an attempt in 1920–1921 to boycott goods from Ulster that were being imported into the south of Ireland. He opposed the Anglo-Irish Treaty and voted against it. He was re-elected for the same constituency at the 1922 general election as an anti-Treaty Sinn Féin TD, but he did not take his seat in the Dáil. He died from the effects of a burst appendix while detained in Mountjoy Prison on 25 December 1922. It has been speculated that this was linked to being weak due to previous hunger strikes. However it seems more likely that it was simply the lengthy delay by government in authorising the required operation.

Parliament of the United Kingdom
Preceded by John Lymbrick Esmonde	Member of Parliament for Tipperary North; 1918–1922	Constituency abolished
Oireachtas
New constituency	Teachta Dála for Tipperary North; 1918–1921	Constituency abolished

Dáil	Election	Deputy (Party)	Deputy (Party)	Deputy (Party)	Deputy (Party)
2nd	1921	Patrick O'Byrne (SF)	Séamus Burke (SF)	Joseph MacDonagh (SF)	P. J. Moloney (SF)
3rd	1922	Daniel Morrissey (Lab)	Séamus Burke (PT-SF)	Joseph MacDonagh (AT-SF)	P. J. Moloney (AT-SF)
4th	1923	Constituency abolished. See Tipperary			
