= Michael Hogan (Irish politician) =

Michael Hogan (1853 – 6 December 1935) was an Irish nationalist politician and a Member of Parliament (MP) for North Tipperary from 1906 to 1910.

He was elected unopposed as an Irish Parliamentary Party MP for North Tipperary at the 1906 general election, and re-elected unopposed at the January 1910 general election. He did not contest the December 1910 general election.

He died on 6 December 1935.

Parliament of the United Kingdom
Preceded by Patrick Joseph O'Brien	Member of Parliament for North Tipperary; 1906 – Dec. 1910	Succeeded by John Joseph Esmonde
