= 1915 North Tipperary by-election =

UK Parliamentary by-election

The 1915 North Tipperary by-election was held on 17 June 1915. The by-election was held due to the death of the incumbent Irish Parliamentary MP, John Joseph Esmonde. It was won by his son, one of the Irish Parliamentary candidates, John Esmonde.

1915 North Tipperary by-election
Party	Candidate	Votes	%	±%
Irish Parliamentary	John Esmonde	1,691	40.5	N/A
Irish Parliamentary	Patrick Hoctor	1,293	31.0	N/A
Irish Parliamentary	Robert Gill	1,192	28.5	N/A
Majority		398	9.5	N/A
Turnout		4,176	74.0	N/A
Registered electors		5,647		
Irish Parliamentary hold		Swing	N/A	
