= Sir Anthony Esmonde, 15th Baronet =

Irish politician (1899–1981)

Sir Anthony Esmonde
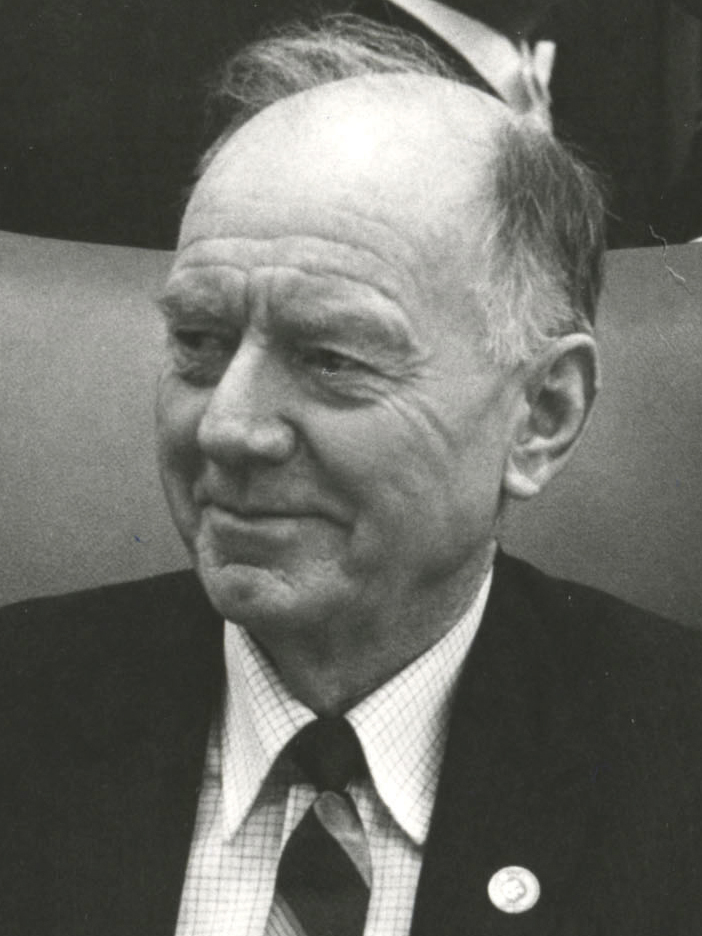
- Esmonde in 1973

Teachta Dála
- In office May 1951 – February 1973
- Constituency: Wexford

Member of the European Parliament
- In office January – March 1973
- Constituency: Oireachtas Delegation

Personal details
- Born: 18 January 1899 Shropshire, England
- Died: 17 March 1981 (aged 82) County Wexford, Ireland
- Party: Fine Gael
- Spouse: Eithne Grattan Esmonde
- Children: 6, including John
- Parent: John Joseph Esmonde (father)
- Relatives: Sir John Lymbrick Esmonde (brother); Eugene Esmonde (half-brother)
- Education: Royal College of Surgeons

Sir Anthony Charles Esmonde, 15th Baronet (18 January 1899 – 17 March 1981) was an Irish Fine Gael politician, medical doctor and farmer.

== Early and personal life ==
He was born on 18 January 1899, at Ashlett House, Church Stretton, Shropshire, the youngest son among the three sons and three daughters of John Joseph Esmonde and his first wife, Rose (née Magennis). He was educated in Germany, at Clongowes Wood College, and at the Royal College of Surgeons in Ireland. After qualifying in 1921 he served as surgeon-lieutenant in the Royal Navy from 1921 to 1925. Thereafter he practised medicine successively in Nenagh, County Tipperary, and Gorey, County Wexford.

== Politics ==
Esmomde first stood for Dáil Éireann as a Fine Gael candidate for the Tipperary constituency at the 1943 general election but was unsuccessful. He did not stand again until the 1951 general election, when he was returned to the 14th Dáil for the Wexford constituency. His brother Sir John Lymbrick Esmonde was previously a TD for Wexford and retired in 1951. He was re-elected at five successive elections until he retired from the Dáil at the 1973 general election.

He served as a member of the first Irish delegation as Members of the European Parliament from January to March 1973.

== Family ==
His eldest brother was Sir John Esmonde, 14th Baronet, and his second elder brother, Lieutenant Geoffrey Esmonde (1897–1916), was killed in action in World War I serving with the 4th Tyneside Irish of the Northumberland Fusiliers. His half-brother Eugene Esmonde was awarded a Victoria Cross posthumously in 1942 during World War II. His son Sir John Esmonde, 16th Baronet was a Fine Gael TD for Wexford from 1973 to 1977.

He married his second cousin Eithne Moira Grattan Esmonde in 1927, the youngest child of Sir Thomas Esmonde, 11th Baronet; they had three sons and three daughters. He died 17 March 1981 in a Wexford nursing home after a short illness.

== See also ==
- Esmonde baronets
- Families in the Oireachtas

Baronetage of Ireland
Preceded by John Lymbrick Esmonde	Baronet (of Ballynastragh); 1958–1981	Succeeded by John Henry Grattan Esmonde

Dáil	Election	Deputy (Party)	Deputy (Party)	Deputy (Party)	Deputy (Party)	Deputy (Party)
2nd	1921	Richard Corish (SF)	James Ryan (SF)	Séamus Doyle (SF)	Seán Etchingham (SF)	4 seats 1921–1923
3rd	1922	Richard Corish (Lab)	Daniel O'Callaghan (Lab)	Séamus Doyle (AT-SF)	Michael Doyle (FP)	4 seats 1921–1923
4th	1923	Richard Corish (Lab)	James Ryan (Rep)	Robert Lambert (Rep)	Michael Doyle (FP)	Osmond Esmonde (CnaG)
5th	1927 (Jun)	Richard Corish (Lab)	James Ryan (FF)	James Shannon (Lab)	Michael Doyle (FP)	John Keating (NL)
6th	1927 (Sep)	Richard Corish (Lab)	James Ryan (FF)	Denis Allen (FF)	Michael Jordan (FP)	Osmond Esmonde (CnaG)
7th	1932	Richard Corish (Lab)	James Ryan (FF)	Denis Allen (FF)	John Keating (CnaG)	Osmond Esmonde (CnaG)
8th	1933	Richard Corish (Lab)	James Ryan (FF)	Patrick Kehoe (FF)	John Keating (CnaG)	Osmond Esmonde (CnaG)
8th	1936 by-election	Richard Corish (Lab)	James Ryan (FF)	Patrick Kehoe (FF)	John Keating (CnaG)	Denis Allen (FF)
9th	1937	Richard Corish (Lab)	James Ryan (FF)	John Keating (FG)	John Esmonde (FG)	Denis Allen (FF)
10th	1938	Richard Corish (Lab)	James Ryan (FF)	John Keating (FG)	John Esmonde (FG)	Denis Allen (FF)
11th	1943	Richard Corish (Lab)	James Ryan (FF)	John O'Leary (Lab)	John Esmonde (FG)	Denis Allen (FF)
12th	1944	Richard Corish (Lab)	James Ryan (FF)	John O'Leary (NLP)	John Keating (FG)	Denis Allen (FF)
12th	1945 by-election	Brendan Corish (Lab)	James Ryan (FF)	John O'Leary (NLP)	John Keating (FG)	Denis Allen (FF)
13th	1948	Brendan Corish (Lab)	James Ryan (FF)	John O'Leary (NLP)	John Esmonde (FG)	Denis Allen (FF)
14th	1951	Brendan Corish (Lab)	James Ryan (FF)	John O'Leary (Lab)	Anthony Esmonde (FG)	Denis Allen (FF)
15th	1954	Brendan Corish (Lab)	James Ryan (FF)	John O'Leary (Lab)	Anthony Esmonde (FG)	Denis Allen (FF)
16th	1957	Brendan Corish (Lab)	James Ryan (FF)	Seán Browne (FF)	Anthony Esmonde (FG)	Denis Allen (FF)
17th	1961	Brendan Corish (Lab)	James Ryan (FF)	Lorcan Allen (FF)	Anthony Esmonde (FG)	4 seats 1961–1981
18th	1965	Brendan Corish (Lab)	James Kennedy (FF)	Lorcan Allen (FF)	Anthony Esmonde (FG)	4 seats 1961–1981
19th	1969	Brendan Corish (Lab)	Seán Browne (FF)	Lorcan Allen (FF)	Anthony Esmonde (FG)	4 seats 1961–1981
20th	1973	Brendan Corish (Lab)	Seán Browne (FF)	Lorcan Allen (FF)	John Esmonde (FG)	4 seats 1961–1981
21st	1977	Brendan Corish (Lab)	Seán Browne (FF)	Lorcan Allen (FF)	Michael D'Arcy (FG)	4 seats 1961–1981
22nd	1981	Brendan Corish (Lab)	Ivan Yates (FG)	Lorcan Allen (FF)	Michael D'Arcy (FG)	Hugh Byrne (FF)
23rd	1982 (Feb)	Seán Browne (FF)	Ivan Yates (FG)	Lorcan Allen (FF)	Michael D'Arcy (FG)	Hugh Byrne (FF)
24th	1982 (Nov)	Avril Doyle (FG)	Ivan Yates (FG)	John Browne (FF)	Michael D'Arcy (FG)	Hugh Byrne (FF)
25th	1987	Avril Doyle (FG)	Ivan Yates (FG)	John Browne (FF)	Brendan Howlin (Lab)	Hugh Byrne (FF)
26th	1989	Michael D'Arcy (FG)	Ivan Yates (FG)	John Browne (FF)	Brendan Howlin (Lab)	Séamus Cullimore (FF)
27th	1992	Avril Doyle (FG)	Ivan Yates (FG)	John Browne (FF)	Brendan Howlin (Lab)	Hugh Byrne (FF)
28th	1997	Michael D'Arcy (FG)	Ivan Yates (FG)	John Browne (FF)	Brendan Howlin (Lab)	Hugh Byrne (FF)
29th	2002	Paul Kehoe (FG)	Liam Twomey (Ind.)	John Browne (FF)	Brendan Howlin (Lab)	Tony Dempsey (FF)
30th	2007	Paul Kehoe (FG)	Michael W. D'Arcy (FG)	John Browne (FF)	Brendan Howlin (Lab)	Seán Connick (FF)
31st	2011	Paul Kehoe (FG)	Liam Twomey (FG)	John Browne (FF)	Brendan Howlin (Lab)	Mick Wallace (Ind.)
32nd	2016	Paul Kehoe (FG)	Michael W. D'Arcy (FG)	James Browne (FF)	Brendan Howlin (Lab)	Mick Wallace (I4C)
32nd	2019 by-election	Paul Kehoe (FG)	Michael W. D'Arcy (FG)	James Browne (FF)	Brendan Howlin (Lab)	Malcolm Byrne (FF)
33rd	2020	Paul Kehoe (FG)	Verona Murphy (Ind.)	James Browne (FF)	Brendan Howlin (Lab)	Johnny Mythen (SF)
34th	2024	4 seats since 2024	Verona Murphy (Ind.)	James Browne (FF)	George Lawlor (Lab)	Johnny Mythen (SF)
