= Baron Esmonde =

Baron Esmonde was a title in the Peerage of Ireland. It was created on 20 May 1632 for Sir Laurence Esmonde. He had earlier renounced the Roman Catholic faith. However, he married a Roman Catholic wife, Margaret O'Flaherty, daughter of Murrough O'Flaherty, Chief of Iar Connacht, with whom he had a son, Thomas. Fearing that her son would be raised a Protestant, Esmonde's wife ran away with their son and brought him up as a strict Roman Catholic. In 1629, three years before his father's elevation to the peerage, Thomas was created a baronet, of Ballynastragh in the County of Wexford. As he was the child of a mixed marriage, the legality of which was disputed (the position was further complicated by his father making a second marriage while his mother was still alive), he was not allowed to succeed in the barony, which became extinct on Lord Esmonde's death in 1646. The Esmonde Baronetcy is still extant, however (see Esmonde baronets).

== Barons Esmonde (1632) ==
- Laurence, 1st Baron Esmonde (died 1646)

== See also ==
- Esmonde baronets
