= Thomas Esmonde (VC) =

British officer and recipient (1829–1872)

Thomas Esmonde VC
- Born: 25 May 1829; Pembrokestown, County Waterford, Ireland
- Died: 14 January 1872 (aged 42); Bruges, Belgium
- Burial place: Bruges Cemetery
- Military career
- Allegiance: United Kingdom
- Branch: British Army
- Service years: 1851–1871
- Rank: Lieutenant Colonel
- Unit: 18th Regiment of Foot
- Conflicts: Crimean War; Second Anglo-Burmese War
- Awards: Victoria Cross

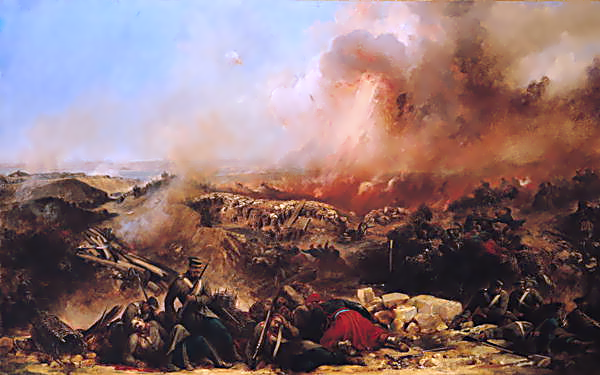
The Siege of Sebastopol

Thomas Esmonde, VC (25 May 1829 – 14 January 1872) (Note: Some sources, e.g. Burke's Peerage, give 25 August 1831 as Esmonde's birth date.) was a British Army officer and an Irish recipient of the Victoria Cross (VC), the highest award for gallantry in the face of the enemy that can be awarded to British and Commonwealth forces.

== Early life and family ==
Esmonde was born in Pembrokestown, County Waterford, the son of Commander James Esmonde of the Royal Navy. His older brother was Sir John Esmonde, 10th Baronet, and he was the great-uncle of Eugene Esmonde, who was to be awarded the Victoria Cross in the Second World War.

Esmonde was educated at the Jesuit-run Clongowes Wood College, County Kildare, from 1840 to 1846. In 1851 he was commissioned as an ensign in the 18th Royal Irish Regiment and served with them in the Second Burmese and Crimean Wars, gaining promotion to captain in April 1855.

== VC action ==
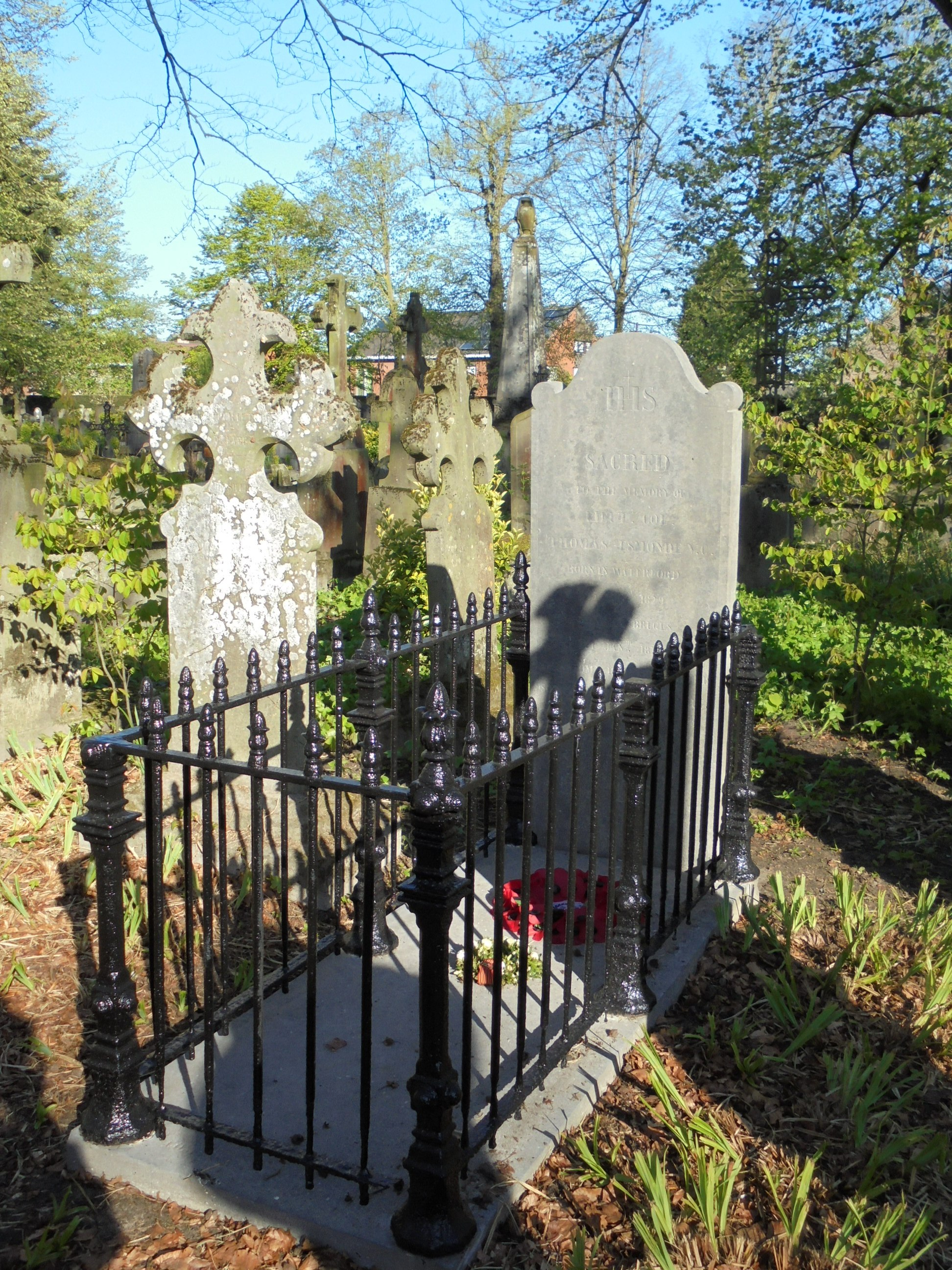
Grave of Thomas Esmonde (Central Cemetery, Bruges, plot 4)

Esmonde was a 26 years old captain in the 18th Regiment of Foot (later The Royal Irish Regiment) in the British Army during the siege of Sebastopol, Crimean War, when the following deeds took place on the 18 and 20 June 1855 for which he was awarded the VC:

For having, after being engaged in the attack on the Redan, repeatedly assisted, at great personal risk under a heavy fire of shell and grape, in rescuing wounded men from exposed situations; and also, while in command of a covering party, two days after, for having rushed with the most prompt and daring gallantry to a spot where a fire-ball-from the enemy had just been lodged, which he effectually extinguished, before it had betrayed the position of the working party under his protection, – thus saving it from a murderous fire of shell and grape, which was immediately opened upon the spot where the fire-ball had fallen.

For his Crimean service, Esmonde was also made a Brevet Major in December 1857. He received his VC from Queen Victoria on 2 August 1858 at Southsea, Hampshire.

== Later years ==
In November 1858, Esmonde married Matilda O'Kelly, with whom he had five children. In May 1865 he was appointed Deputy Inspector-General of the Royal Irish Constabulary, while remaining in the army on half-pay on the unattached list, where he was promoted to Brevet Lieutenant-Colonel in December 1868. He formally retired from the army in April 1871.

While out hunting in Belgium, Esmonde suffered a severe eye injury when his horse rode into a bush. This led to his hospitalisation and ultimately caused his death in Bruges on 14 January 1872, at St Julian's Hospital. He was buried at the Central Cemetery of Bruges. In 2017 his grave was restored by volunteers from the Victoria Cross Trust.

Esmonde's medals, including his VC, are in the possession of the Esmonde family, and have been loaned to the Imperial War Museum in London for display in the Ashcroft Gallery.

== Literature ==
- Roland Rotsaert Thomas Esmonde en zijn graf op de Centrale Begraafplaats, in: Brugs Ommeland, 2017.
