= Eugene Esmonde =

Royal Navy Lieutenant Commander(1909–1942)

Lieutenant-Commander Eugene Esmonde VC DSO
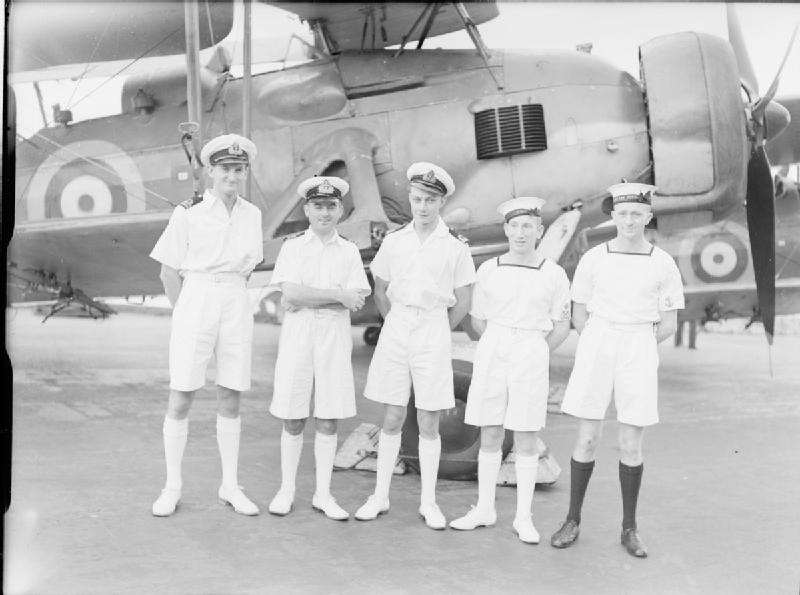
- Officers and ratings who were decorated for the part they played in the sinking of the Bismarck, pictured in front of a Fairey Swordfish aboard HMS Ark Royal. Esmonde is second from left.
- Born: 1 March 1909; Thurgoland, Yorkshire
- Died: 12 February 1942 (aged 32); English Channel
- Burial place: Woodlands Cemetery, Gillingham, Kent
- Relatives: John Joseph Esmonde (father); Sir John Esmonde, 14th Baronet (brother); Sir Anthony Esmonde, 15th Baronet (brother); Thomas Esmonde (great-uncle)
- Military career
- Allegiance: United Kingdom
- Branch: Royal Air Force (1928–34); Royal Navy (1939–42)
- Service years: 1928–1934; 1939–1942
- Rank: Lieutenant-Commander
- Commands: 825 Naval Air Squadron (1940–42); 754 Naval Air Squadron (1939)
- Conflicts: Second World War: Atlantic War; Operation Rheinübung; Sinking of the battleship Bismarck; Channel Dash †
- Awards: Victoria Cross; Distinguished Service Order; Mentioned in dispatches

Lieutenant-Commander Eugene Esmonde, VC, DSO (1 March 1909 – 12 February 1942) was a distinguished Irish pilot in the Fleet Air Arm who was posthumously awarded the Victoria Cross (VC), the highest award for gallantry in the face of the enemy awarded to members of Commonwealth forces. Esmonde earned this award while in command of a torpedo bomber squadron in the Second World War - in an action known as Operation Fuller, the 'Channel Dash’.

== Early life ==
Esmonde was born on 1 March 1909 in Thurgoland, Yorkshire, near Barnsley. His mother, Eily O’Sullivan, was his father's second wife. Dr John Joseph Esmonde (1862–1915) had married her in 1904, after his first wife died in 1901. Dr. Esmonde was an Irish Catholic, a former Irish MP, who was in general practice in Yorkshire.

Esmonde had six natural siblings (including a twin brother) and six half-siblings - three male, three female - from his father's first marriage to Rose McGuinness. The natural siblings were: Owen, Donal, John Witham, his twin James, Carmel and Patrick. His half-brothers were: Sir John Esmonde, 14th Baronet, who served in the First World War; Second Lieutenant Geoffrey Esmonde (1897–1916), who was killed in action in the First World War serving with the 26th Tyneside Irish Battalion of the Northumberland Fusiliers; and Sir Anthony Esmonde, 15th Baronet.

His father, died in 1915, when Esmonde and his siblings were all quite young. He had been serving in the Royal Army Medical Corps, and succumbed to pneumonia, after being laid low by over-work.

Though born in England, Esmonde's parents were from Ireland and the family returned to the Esmonde family's ancestral home - Esmonde baronets - in Drominagh, County Tipperary. He was educated by the Jesuits, first at Wimbledon College in London and then at Clongowes Wood College in County Kildare, Ireland.

Esmonde was commissioned into the Royal Air Force (RAF) as a pilot officer on probation on 28 December 1928. During the early 1930s, Esmonde served first in the RAF, and then transferred to the Fleet Air Arm where he served in the Mediterranean when responsibility for naval aviation was returned to the Royal Navy. Upon leaving the navy in 1934, he flew for Imperial Airways. and amongst other feats he flew flying boats and the first surcharged airmail to Australia.

== Second World War ==
=== Early wartime career ===
At the start of the Second World War, he returned to the Fleet Air Arm with the rank of lieutenant commander. His first sea posting was to HMS Courageous, which was sunk in September 1939. He returned to sea duty on board HMS Victorious after a series of postings to shore-based stations.

On the night of 24 May 1941, Esmonde led No. 825 Naval Air Squadron's nine Fairey Swordfish torpedo bombers in an attack against the German battleship Bismarck. This attack took place after the Battle of the Denmark Strait, in which Bismarck sank HMS Hood. The biplanes flying from Victorious made a 193 km (120-mile) flight in foul North Atlantic weather and one torpedo hit the Bismarck amidships, leading either directly or indirectly through hard manoeuvring to earlier damage opening up, causing further flooding and a boiler room rendered unusable. The Commander-in-Chief of the Home Fleet wrote in his despatch to the Admiralty that 'This attack, by a squadron so lately embarked in a new carrier, in unfavourable weather conditions, was magnificently carried out and reflects the greatest credit on all concerned,' adding 'There can be little doubt that the hit was largely responsible for the Bismarck finally being brought to action and sunk,' (although it was another torpedo hit by aircraft of Ark Royal several days later that led to the battleship's final destruction). Esmonde was decorated with the Distinguished Service Order on 11 February 1942 for his leadership and actions (the award was announced on 16 September 1941).

His squadron was serving on HMS Ark Royal when she was torpedoed in November 1941. Attempts to tow her to Gibraltar were abandoned, and on 14 November 1941 she sank. The Swordfish of the squadron ferried some of the crew off the ship before she sank; Esmonde was mentioned in dispatches for his actions on this occasion.

=== Channel Dash ===
Esmonde earned his Victoria Cross when he led his squadron against elements of the German fleet which were making the "Channel Dash" (Operation Cerberus) from Brest in an attempt to return to their home bases at Wilhelmshaven and Kiel through the English Channel. On 12 February 1942 off the coast of England, 32-year-old Lieutenant Commander Esmonde led a detachment of six Fairey Swordfish in an attack on the German battlecruisers Scharnhorst and Gneisenau and the heavy cruiser Prinz Eugen. All three had left Brest unopposed, and with a strong escort of smaller craft and fighter aircraft.

The British had long-anticipated the movement of these ships and had formulated a combined operation of attack by sea, air and land artillery, as the Germans approached the Straits of Dover. The plan was termed Operation Fuller. It was not executed well, principally because the Germans vessels were not detected until they were almost at Dover. Consequently, everything was hurried and poorly coordinated.

Esmonde’s squadron received orders to attack, but no fighter coverage materialised. He waited as long as he felt he could for his escorts to appear, but eventually took off without them. One of the fighter squadrons (10 Supermarine Spitfires of No. 72 Squadron RAF) did rendezvous with Esmonde's squadron; the two squadrons were later attacked by enemy fighters of JG 2 and JG 26 as part of Operation Donnerkeil, the German air superiority plan for the mission. The subsequent fighting left all of the planes in Esmonde's squadron damaged, and caused them to become separated from their fighter escort.

The torpedo bombers continued their attack, in spite of their damage and lack of fighter protection. There was heavy anti-aircraft fire from the German ships, and Esmonde's aeroplane possibly sustained a direct hit from anti-aircraft fire that destroyed most of one of the port wings of his Swordfish biplane. Esmonde led his flight through a screen of the enemy destroyers and other small vessels protecting the battleships. He was still 2,700 metres from his target when he was hit by a Focke-Wulf Fw 190, resulting in his aircraft bursting into flames and crashing into the sea. The remaining aircraft continued the attack, but all were shot down by enemy fighters; only five of the 18 crew survived the action. The four surviving officers received the Distinguished Service Order, and the enlisted survivor was awarded the Conspicuous Gallantry Medal.

The courage of the Swordfish crews was noted by friend and foe alike. Admiral Bertram Ramsay later wrote, "In my opinion the gallant sortie of these six Swordfish aircraft constitutes one of the finest exhibitions of self-sacrifice and devotion to duty the war had ever witnessed", while Admiral Otto Ciliax in the Scharnhorst described "The mothball attack of a handful of ancient planes, piloted by men whose bravery surpasses any other action by either side that day". As he watched the smoking wrecks of the Swordfish falling into the sea, Captain Hoffmann of the Scharnhorst exclaimed, "Poor fellows, they are so very slow, it is nothing but suicide for them to fly against these big ships". Willhelm Wolf aboard the Scharnhorst wrote, "What an heroic stage for them to meet their end! Behind them their homeland, which they had just left with their hearts steeled to their purpose, still in view".

The award of the VC was gazetted on 3 March 1942, the citation read:

ADMIRALTY. Whitehall. 3rd March, 1942.

The KING has been graciously pleased to approve the grant of the VICTORIA CROSS, for valour and resolution in action against the Enemy, to:

The late Lieutenant-Commander (A) Eugene Esmonde, D.S.O., Royal Navy.

On the morning of Thursday, 12th February, 1942, Lieutenant-Commander Esmonde, in command of a Squadron of the Fleet Air Arm, was told that the German Battle-Cruisers SCHARNHORST and GNEISENAU and the Cruiser PRINZ EUGEN, strongly escorted by some thirty surface craft, were entering the Straits of Dover, and that his Squadron must attack before they reached the sand-banks North East of Calais.

Lieutenant-Commander Esmonde knew well that his enterprise was desperate. Soon after noon he and his squadron of six Swordfish set course for the Enemy, and after ten minutes flight were attacked by a strong force of Enemy fighters. Touch was lost with his fighter escort; and in the action which followed all his aircraft were damaged. He flew on, cool and resolute, serenely challenging hopeless odds, to encounter the deadly fire of the Battle-Cruisers and their Escort, which shattered the port wing of his aircraft. Undismayed, he led his Squadron on, straight through this inferno of fire, in steady flight towards their target. Almost at once he was shot down; but his Squadron went on to launch a gallant attack, in which at least one torpedo is believed to have struck the German Battle-Cruisers, and from which not one of the six aircraft returned.

His high courage and splendid resolution will live in the traditions of the Royal Navy, and remain for many generations a fine and stirring memory.

In fact, no torpedo hits were achieved.

Esmonde was remembered in Winston Churchill's famous broadcast speech on 13 May 1945, "Five years of War", as having defended Ireland's honour:

When I think of these days I think also of other episodes and personalities. I do not forget Lieutenant-Commander Esmonde, V.C., D.S.O., Lance-Corporal Kenneally, V.C., Captain Fegen, V.C., and other Irish heroes that I could easily recite, and all bitterness by Britain for the Irish race dies in my heart. I can only pray that in years which I shall not see, the shame will be forgotten and the glories will endure, and that the peoples of the British Isles and of the British Commonwealth of Nations will walk together in mutual comprehension and forgiveness."

Seven weeks later Lieutenant Commander Esmonde's body, still in his lifejacket, was washed ashore in the Thames Estuary near the River Medway. Esmonde was buried in the Woodlands Cemetery, Gillingham, Kent on 30 April 1942.

His great-uncle Thomas Esmonde, had been awarded the Victoria Cross in the Crimean War.
