= North Tipperary (UK Parliament constituency) =

Former parliamentary constituency in the United Kingdom

- Former county constituency for the House of Commons

1885–1922
- Seats: 1
- Created from: County Tipperary
- Replaced by: Tipperary Mid, North and South

North Tipperary was a UK Parliament constituency in Ireland, returning one Member of Parliament from 1885 to 1922. Prior to the 1885 United Kingdom general election the area was part of the County Tipperary constituency. From 1922, on the establishment of the Irish Free State, it was not represented in the UK Parliament.

== Boundaries ==
This constituency comprised the northern part of County Tipperary.

1885–1922: The baronies of Ormond Lower, Ormond Upper, and Owney and Arra, and that part of the barony of Kilnamanagh Upper contained within the parishes of Glenkeen and Upperchurch.

== Members of Parliament ==
Election	Member	Party
1885	Patrick Joseph O'Brien	Irish Parliamentary
1891	Patrick Joseph O'Brien	Irish National Federation
1900	Patrick Joseph O'Brien	Irish Parliamentary Party
1906	Michael Hogan	Irish Parliamentary
Dec 1910	John Joseph Esmonde	Irish Parliamentary
1915	John Lymbrick Esmonde	Irish Parliamentary
1918	Joseph MacDonagh	Sinn Féin
1922	Constituency Abolished	

== Elections ==
=== Elections in the 1880s ===
1885 general election: North Tipperary
Party	Candidate	Votes	%	±%
Irish Parliamentary	Patrick Joseph O'Brien	4,789	95.0	
Irish Conservative	Henry Eustace	252	5.0	
Majority		4,537	90.0	
Turnout		5,041	67.2	
Registered electors		7,500		
Irish Parliamentary win (new seat)				

1886 general election: North Tipperary
Party	Candidate	Votes	%	±%
Irish Parliamentary	Patrick Joseph O'Brien	Unopposed		
Registered electors		7,500		
Irish Parliamentary hold				

=== Elections in the 1890s ===
1892 general election: North Tipperary
Party	Candidate	Votes	%	±%
Irish National Federation	Patrick Joseph O'Brien	4,064	89.8	N/A
Irish Unionist	Cosby Godolphin Trench	462	10.2	New
Majority		3,602	79.6	N/A
Turnout		4,526	64.4	N/A
Registered electors		7,029		
Irish National Federation gain from Irish Parliamentary		Swing	N/A	

1895 general election: North Tipperary
Party	Candidate	Votes	%	±%
Irish National Federation	Patrick Joseph O'Brien	Unopposed		
Registered electors		6,419		
Irish National Federation hold				

=== Elections in the 1900s ===
1900 general election: North Tipperary
Party	Candidate	Votes	%	±%
Irish Parliamentary	Patrick Joseph O'Brien	Unopposed		
Registered electors		6,226		
Irish Parliamentary hold				

1906 general election: North Tipperary
Party	Candidate	Votes	%	±%
Irish Parliamentary	Michael Hogan	Unopposed		
Registered electors		5,659		
Irish Parliamentary hold				

=== Elections in the 1910s ===
January 1910 general election: North Tipperary
Party	Candidate	Votes	%	±%
Irish Parliamentary	Michael Hogan	Unopposed		
Registered electors		5,421		
Irish Parliamentary hold				

December 1910 general election: North Tipperary
Party	Candidate	Votes	%	±%
Irish Parliamentary	John Joseph Esmonde	Unopposed		
Registered electors		5,421		
Irish Parliamentary hold				

Esmonde's death causes a by-election, in which three nationalists contested each other.

1915 North Tipperary by-election
Party	Candidate	Votes	%	±%
Irish Parliamentary	John Lymbrick Esmonde	1,691	40.5	N/A
Irish Parliamentary	Patrick Hoctor	1,293	31.0	N/A
Irish Parliamentary	Robert Gill	1,192	28.5	N/A
Majority		398	9.5	N/A
Turnout		4,176	74.0	N/A
Registered electors		5,647		
Irish Parliamentary hold		Swing	N/A	

1918 general election: North Tipperary
Party	Candidate	Votes	%	±%
Sinn Féin	Joseph MacDonagh	Unopposed		
Registered electors		16,455		
Sinn Féin gain from Irish Parliamentary				
