= Sir John Esmonde, 14th Baronet =

Irish politician (1893–1958)

Sir John Esmonde

Teachta Dála
- In office February 1948 – May 1951
- In office July 1937 – May 1944
- Constituency: Wexford

Member of Parliament
- In office June 1915 – December 1918
- Preceded by: John Joseph Esmonde
- Succeeded by: Joseph MacDonagh
- Constituency: North Tipperary

Personal details
- Born: 15 December 1893 Shropshire, England
- Died: 6 July 1958 (aged 64) Dublin, Ireland
- Party: Fine Gael; Independent
- Other political affiliations: Irish Parliamentary Party
- Spouse: Eleanor Fitzharrise (m. 1922)
- Education: King's Inns

Military service
- Branch/service: British Army
- Rank: Captain
- Unit: Leinster Regiment; Royal Dublin Fusiliers
- Battles/wars: World War I

Sir John Lymbrick Esmonde, 14th Baronet (15 December 1893 – 6 July 1958) was an Irish nationalist politician who served as Member of Parliament (MP) in the Parliament of the United Kingdom from 1915 to 1918 and later as a Teachta Dála (TD) in Dáil Éireann from 1937 to 1944, and again from 1948 to 1951.

== Early life ==
Esmonde was born 15 December 1893 at Pontesbury, Shropshire, England, eldest among three sons and three daughters of John Joseph Esmonde MP, a medical doctor who practised for twenty-four years in England before returning to family lands at Drominagh, Borrisokane, County Tipperary. He was educated at schools in Germany and Belgium, and at Clongowes Wood College, County Kildare. He apprenticed as a marine engineer at Harland and Wolff, Belfast from 1911 to 1914.

== World War I ==
On the death of his father in 1915 during service with the Royal Army Medical Corps in World War I, he was elected in the by-election in his place (opposed by two nationalist contenders) as Irish Parliamentary Party MP for North Tipperary while also serving in the war with the Leinster Regiment, then as Captain with the Royal Dublin Fusiliers with the Intelligence Corps. He was the Baby of the House when elected.

He was one of five Irish MPs who served with Irish regiments in World War I, the others Stephen Gwynn, Willie Redmond, William Redmond and D. D. Sheehan as well as former MP Tom Kettle. Esmonde served with the forces that put down the 1916 Easter Rising.

== Legal career ==
He studied at the King's Inns, qualifying as a barrister, and was called to the Bar of Ireland. He was called to the inner bar as Senior Counsel in 1942, and was elected as a Bencher of the King's Inns in 1948.

== Political career ==
He did not defend his seat at the 1918 general election. He inherited the Esmonde Baronetcy when the senior male line died out in 1943. He was defeated in the 1936 Wexford by-election to fill the vacancy created by the death of the sitting TD, his second cousin Sir Osmond Esmonde. He subsequently served as a Fine Gael Teachta Dála (TD) for the Wexford constituency, where he won a seat at the 1937 general election. He was re-elected at the 1938 and 1943 elections, but lost his Dáil seat at the 1944 general election. He was re-elected as a TD for Wexford at the 1948 general election.

In 1948, before the formation of the First Inter-Party Government, he was suggested as possible Taoiseach by Seán MacBride, on the grounds that he had no link to either side in the Civil War, a position that went to John A. Costello.

In July 1950, he resigned from Fine Gael, although he kept his resignation private until September, after the 1950 local elections. He gave as his reason the predominance in the party of Cumann na nGaedheal over the old National Centre Party (to which he belonged originally), the lack of consultation with backbenchers and concessions made to the Labour Party. It seems likely that he was aggrieved that he was not appointed to succeed Cecil Lavery as Attorney General in April 1950. He continued to support the government as an independent. On 1 May 1951, he resigned from the Dáil, shortly before the 1951 general election.

He was one of the few people who served as a Member of Parliament in the House of Commons as well as a TD of Dáil Éireann, the lower House of the Irish parliament.

== Notable family ==
His younger brother Lt. Geoffrey Esmonde (1897–1916) aged 19 was killed in action in World War I serving with the 4th Tyneside Irish Battalion of the Northumberland Fusiliers. His second younger brother was Sir Anthony Esmonde, 15th Baronet. His half-brother Eugene Esmonde was awarded a Victoria Cross posthumously in 1942 during World War II.

== Later life and death ==
He married Eleanor Fitzharris in 1922; they had no children. He died on 6 July 1958 in a Dublin nursing home.

== See also ==
- Families in the Oireachtas

Parliament of the United Kingdom
Preceded by John Joseph Esmonde	Member of Parliament for North Tipperary; 1915–1918	Succeeded by Joseph MacDonagh
Baronetage of Ireland
Preceded by Laurence Esmonde	Baronet (of Clonegall); 1943–1958	Succeeded by Anthony Esmonde

Dáil	Election	Deputy (Party)	Deputy (Party)	Deputy (Party)	Deputy (Party)	Deputy (Party)
2nd	1921	Richard Corish (SF)	James Ryan (SF)	Séamus Doyle (SF)	Seán Etchingham (SF)	4 seats 1921–1923
3rd	1922	Richard Corish (Lab)	Daniel O'Callaghan (Lab)	Séamus Doyle (AT-SF)	Michael Doyle (FP)	4 seats 1921–1923
4th	1923	Richard Corish (Lab)	James Ryan (Rep)	Robert Lambert (Rep)	Michael Doyle (FP)	Osmond Esmonde (CnaG)
5th	1927 (Jun)	Richard Corish (Lab)	James Ryan (FF)	James Shannon (Lab)	Michael Doyle (FP)	John Keating (NL)
6th	1927 (Sep)	Richard Corish (Lab)	James Ryan (FF)	Denis Allen (FF)	Michael Jordan (FP)	Osmond Esmonde (CnaG)
7th	1932	Richard Corish (Lab)	James Ryan (FF)	Denis Allen (FF)	John Keating (CnaG)	Osmond Esmonde (CnaG)
8th	1933	Richard Corish (Lab)	James Ryan (FF)	Patrick Kehoe (FF)	John Keating (CnaG)	Osmond Esmonde (CnaG)
8th	1936 by-election	Richard Corish (Lab)	James Ryan (FF)	Patrick Kehoe (FF)	John Keating (CnaG)	Denis Allen (FF)
9th	1937	Richard Corish (Lab)	James Ryan (FF)	John Keating (FG)	John Esmonde (FG)	Denis Allen (FF)
10th	1938	Richard Corish (Lab)	James Ryan (FF)	John Keating (FG)	John Esmonde (FG)	Denis Allen (FF)
11th	1943	Richard Corish (Lab)	James Ryan (FF)	John O'Leary (Lab)	John Esmonde (FG)	Denis Allen (FF)
12th	1944	Richard Corish (Lab)	James Ryan (FF)	John O'Leary (NLP)	John Keating (FG)	Denis Allen (FF)
12th	1945 by-election	Brendan Corish (Lab)	James Ryan (FF)	John O'Leary (NLP)	John Keating (FG)	Denis Allen (FF)
13th	1948	Brendan Corish (Lab)	James Ryan (FF)	John O'Leary (NLP)	John Esmonde (FG)	Denis Allen (FF)
14th	1951	Brendan Corish (Lab)	James Ryan (FF)	John O'Leary (Lab)	Anthony Esmonde (FG)	Denis Allen (FF)
15th	1954	Brendan Corish (Lab)	James Ryan (FF)	John O'Leary (Lab)	Anthony Esmonde (FG)	Denis Allen (FF)
16th	1957	Brendan Corish (Lab)	James Ryan (FF)	Seán Browne (FF)	Anthony Esmonde (FG)	Denis Allen (FF)
17th	1961	Brendan Corish (Lab)	James Ryan (FF)	Lorcan Allen (FF)	Anthony Esmonde (FG)	4 seats 1961–1981
18th	1965	Brendan Corish (Lab)	James Kennedy (FF)	Lorcan Allen (FF)	Anthony Esmonde (FG)	4 seats 1961–1981
19th	1969	Brendan Corish (Lab)	Seán Browne (FF)	Lorcan Allen (FF)	Anthony Esmonde (FG)	4 seats 1961–1981
20th	1973	Brendan Corish (Lab)	Seán Browne (FF)	Lorcan Allen (FF)	John Esmonde (FG)	4 seats 1961–1981
21st	1977	Brendan Corish (Lab)	Seán Browne (FF)	Lorcan Allen (FF)	Michael D'Arcy (FG)	4 seats 1961–1981
22nd	1981	Brendan Corish (Lab)	Ivan Yates (FG)	Lorcan Allen (FF)	Michael D'Arcy (FG)	Hugh Byrne (FF)
23rd	1982 (Feb)	Seán Browne (FF)	Ivan Yates (FG)	Lorcan Allen (FF)	Michael D'Arcy (FG)	Hugh Byrne (FF)
24th	1982 (Nov)	Avril Doyle (FG)	Ivan Yates (FG)	John Browne (FF)	Michael D'Arcy (FG)	Hugh Byrne (FF)
25th	1987	Avril Doyle (FG)	Ivan Yates (FG)	John Browne (FF)	Brendan Howlin (Lab)	Hugh Byrne (FF)
26th	1989	Michael D'Arcy (FG)	Ivan Yates (FG)	John Browne (FF)	Brendan Howlin (Lab)	Séamus Cullimore (FF)
27th	1992	Avril Doyle (FG)	Ivan Yates (FG)	John Browne (FF)	Brendan Howlin (Lab)	Hugh Byrne (FF)
28th	1997	Michael D'Arcy (FG)	Ivan Yates (FG)	John Browne (FF)	Brendan Howlin (Lab)	Hugh Byrne (FF)
29th	2002	Paul Kehoe (FG)	Liam Twomey (Ind.)	John Browne (FF)	Brendan Howlin (Lab)	Tony Dempsey (FF)
30th	2007	Paul Kehoe (FG)	Michael W. D'Arcy (FG)	John Browne (FF)	Brendan Howlin (Lab)	Seán Connick (FF)
31st	2011	Paul Kehoe (FG)	Liam Twomey (FG)	John Browne (FF)	Brendan Howlin (Lab)	Mick Wallace (Ind.)
32nd	2016	Paul Kehoe (FG)	Michael W. D'Arcy (FG)	James Browne (FF)	Brendan Howlin (Lab)	Mick Wallace (I4C)
32nd	2019 by-election	Paul Kehoe (FG)	Michael W. D'Arcy (FG)	James Browne (FF)	Brendan Howlin (Lab)	Malcolm Byrne (FF)
33rd	2020	Paul Kehoe (FG)	Verona Murphy (Ind.)	James Browne (FF)	Brendan Howlin (Lab)	Johnny Mythen (SF)
34th	2024	4 seats since 2024	Verona Murphy (Ind.)	James Browne (FF)	George Lawlor (Lab)	Johnny Mythen (SF)
