= Drominagh =

Townland in County Tipperary, Ireland

Coordinates: 53.0450°N 8.2406°W

Drominagh (Drom Aidhneach in Irish) is a townland in the Barony of Ormond Lower, County Tipperary, Ireland. It is located in the civil parish of Terryglass, near Borrisokane. It is here that the Ballyfinboy River enters Lough Derg. Eugene Esmonde, a recipient of the Victoria Cross, was from Drominagh.
