= John Esmonde (North Tipperary MP) =

British politician

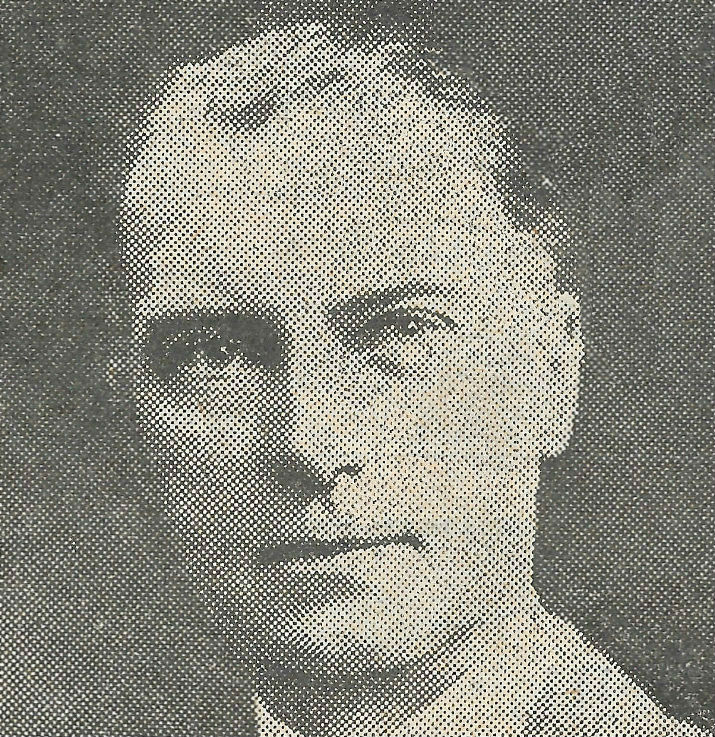

Member of Parliament for North Tipperary
- In office December 1910 – 17 April 1915
- Preceded by: Michael Hogan
- Succeeded by: John Lymbrick Esmonde

Personal details
- Born: 27 January 1862 Drominagh, County Tipperary, Ireland
- Died: 17 April 1915 (aged 53)
- Spouse(s): Rose Magennis (d. 1901); Eily O'Sullivan (d. 1957)

Military service
- Allegiance: United Kingdom
- Branch/service: British Army
- Years of service: 1914–1915
- Rank: Captain
- Unit: Royal Army Medical Corps
- Battles/wars: First World War

John Joseph Esmonde (27 January 1862 – 17 April 1915) was a physician and an Irish nationalist Member of Parliament for North Tipperary from 1910 to 1915.

== Family ==
Esmonde was born on 27 January 1862 in Drominagh, Borrisokane, County Tipperary, Ireland. Esmonde's father, James Esmonde, was the younger brother of Sir John Esmonde, 10th Baronet, and his mother was Caroline Sugrue. He was the second child of four.

Esmonde had three sons and three daughters from his first marriage to Rose Magennis whilst living in Ingleside, Pontesbury, Shropshire, England, including:

- John Lymbrick Esmonde (1893–1958)
- Geoffrey Esmonde (1897–1916) was killed in action serving with the 4th Tyneside Irish Battalion of the Northumberland Fusiliers in the First World War
- Anthony Charles Esmonde (1899–1981)

Following the death of Rose in 1901, Esmonde married Eily O'Sullivan in 1904 and had seven more children. The family returned to Ireland in 1910. A son from his second marriage, Eugene Esmonde, was awarded a Victoria Cross posthumously in 1942. Esmonde's youngest son, Paddy, was awarded the Military Cross whilst serving in the Royal Army Medical Corps at the Rhine in 1944.

== Death and legacy ==
On 17 April 1915, while serving as captain in the Royal Army Medical Corps, Esmonde died from "pneumonia and heart failure consequent on the strain of overwork". He was buried in his family vault in Terryglass, County Tipperary. Esmonde is commemorated on Panel 1 of the Parliamentary War Memorial in Westminster Hall, one of 22 MPs that died during the First World War to be named on that memorial. A further act of commemoration came with the unveiling in 1932 of a manuscript-style illuminated book of remembrance for the House of Commons, which includes a short biographical account of the life and death of Esmonde.

Parliament of the United Kingdom
Preceded by Michael Hogan	Member of Parliament for North Tipperary; December 1910–1915	Succeeded by John Lymbrick Esmonde
