= Laurence Esmonde, 1st Baron Esmonde =

Irish peer

Sir Laurence Esmonde, 1st Baron Esmonde (1570?–1646), was an Irish peer who held office as governor of the fort of Duncannon in County Wexford. He was a leading Irish Royalist commander in the English Civil War, but was later suspected of disloyalty to the English Crown when he surrendered Duncannon Fort to the enemy. He was the ancestor of the Esmonde Baronets, although the barony died with him.

== Early life ==
Esmonde was the second son of Walter Esmonde of Johnstown, Wexford, and his wife Margaret, daughter of Michael Furlong of Horetown. He converted to Protestantism in his twenties and served with credit against Spain in the Low Countries. In 1599, he was appointed to the command of 150 foot soldiers and was actively engaged during the rebellion of Hugh O'Neill; it appears from a letter of his to Lord Shrewsbury that he endeavoured to procure the assassination or banishment of O'Neill, but in this he was unsuccessful. His services were, however, rewarded with a knighthood. He saw service under Mountjoy in County Monaghan, but quarrelled bitterly with the Governor of Monaghan, the hot-tempered and impulsive Christopher, Baron Howth.

During one of his expeditions into Connaught, he fell in love with Margaret O'Flaherty, daughter of Murrough O'Flaherty, Chief of Iar Connacht, whom he married. They had a son Thomas, whom his father always acknowledged to be his child, but the lady was as remarkable for her Roman Catholic faith as for her personal charms, and fearing lest her infant son might be brought up a Protestant, she fled with him to her family in Connaught. Esmonde thereupon repudiated her, denied that their union had been legal, and married the twice-widowed Ellice, or Elizabeth Butler, daughter of the Hon. Walter Butler, fourth son of James Butler, 9th Earl of Ormond, and his wife Anne MacBrien O'Gonagh. In December 1606, he succeeded Sir Josias Bodley as governor of the important fort of Duncannon, a post which he held until his death in 1646. He was selected High Sheriff of Waterford for 1607 and elected MP for Wicklow in 1613.

In 1611, as the Lord Deputy of Ireland, Sir Arthur Chichester was planning a plantation in Wexford, Esmond and Sir Edward Fisher were appointed to survey the confiscated territory, and for his services, he was rewarded with a grant of fifteen hundred acres.

== Later career ==
In 1619, having purchased a grant of certain lands in Wicklow from Sir Patrick Maule, Esmonde became involved in a transaction known as the case of Phelim MacPheagh O'Byrne, which was generally thought to reflect discredit on him. He was charged with packing juries and torturing witnesses in order to wrest the lands out of the possession of the O'Byrnes. The "finding of title" by Anglo-Irish and New English landowners to dispossess the Old Irish had become a common practice and the original landowners were largely helpless to resist these attacks on their rights. O'Byrne's charges against Esmonde were dismissed and he, in turn, was convicted of perjury and imprisoned in Dublin Castle. O'Byrne however was undeterred, addressing a flood of petitions to the English Crown, accusing Esmonde and the Lord Deputy of Ireland, Lord Falkland, of conspiracy and perjury. O'Byrne did not regain his lands but he did damage his enemies' reputations, and Falkland's recall was thought to be partly due to the O'Byrne case. Wedgwood, in her biography of Falkland's successor, the Earl of Strafford, notes that Strafford himself, when Lord Deputy of Ireland, acquired much of the O'Byrne property by less than scrupulous means. Bad as Esmonde's conduct may have been, it was probably no worse than that of many of his contemporaries.

== Peerage ==
He owned large properties in Wexford, Waterford, Kilkenny, and Tipperary. He was created Baron Esmonde of Lymbricke, Wexford, on 20 May 1632. The peerage was destined to die with him: his second marriage produced no heir, and while he treated his son Thomas generously enough, he would not admit that his first marriage to Thomas's mother Margaret was lawful.

== Attack on the Earl of Strafford ==
In 1639 he was summoned before the Star Chamber for having conspired with Lord Mountnorris and Sir Piers Crosby to libel the Lord Deputy, the Earl of Strafford, in the case of one Robert Esmonde, a relative of Lord Esmonde, whose death Strafford was accused of causing by ill-treatment while he was being questioned about customs evasions. Stafford, who was a formidable, even at times a terrifying personality, and was then at the height of his power, had the charge dismissed and brought a counter-suit for libel. The charge was almost certainly false- Strafford, though intimidating, was not a physically violent man- but it was one of many accusations repeated at Strafford's impeachment two years later. Esmonde was one of many of the Anglo-Irish nobility who helped to bring Strafford down, by supporting the impeachment, which led to his attainder for treason and execution, only to see their own prosperity and security destroyed in the ensuing Irish Rebellion of 1641.

== Siege of Duncannon ==
After the outbreak of the English Civil War, he seems to have tried to maintain a neutral position between King Charles I and the English Parliament; but by 1646 the suspicions of the Irish Confederacy as to his loyalty had been aroused by the fact that many of his officers and soldiers were Roundheads and had broken the "Cessation" (the truce which had been signed between the King and the Irish Confederates). They advised James Butler, 1st Duke of Ormonde "to have a care of the fort of Duncannon". Ormonde was unable or unwilling to interfere, but the Confederates were further alarmed by the defection of Lord Inchiquin to the side of Parliament. On the orders of the Confederacy, General Preston began the Siege of Duncannon in January 1646. The place was "extremely decayed with age;" but though "the governor (Esmonde) was old and unable to act anything in this exigence," "the defendants behaved themselves exceeding well".

The death of Esmond's second-in-command, Captain Lorcan, however, so discouraged them that they held a parley, and, without consulting Esmonde, surrendered the fort on St. Patrick's Day. The next day, a relief force from the English Parliament appeared in the river, but finding the place in enemy hands, immediately sailed away. Esmonde, surviving the surrender of Duncannon by only two months, died at Adamstown, and was buried at Limbrick (present-day Killinierin) in a church he had built himself.

== Appearance ==
He is said to have been a man of 'sanguine complexion, of an indifferent tall stature, a compact, solid, corpulent body, with robustious limbs.'

== Inheritance ==
Having no issue by his second wife Elizabeth Butler, he bequeathed his immense property to Thomas Esmonde, the son of his first wife Margaret O'Flaherty, whom he had repudiated. Thomas could not inherit the barony, since his father, while willing to name him as his heir, would not admit his legitimacy. He had already in 1629 been created the first of the Esmonde Baronets: the title still exists. Thomas faced considerable difficulty in asserting his claim: his father's stepson Patrick Sherlock also laid claim to the estates, as for no very clear reason did the Cromwellian army officer William Halsey.
