= Esmonde baronets =

Baronetcy in the Baronetage of Ireland

The Esmonde Baronetcy, of Ballynastragh in the County of Wexford, is a title in the Baronetage of Ireland. It was created on 28 January 1629 for Thomas Esmonde. He raised a cavalry regiment for Charles I and commanded a regiment during the Siege of La Rochelle. Esmonde was the only son of Sir Laurence Esmonde, who had abandoned the Roman Catholic faith during the reign of Queen Elizabeth and was raised to the Peerage of Ireland as Baron Esmonde in 1632. Lord Esmonde married firstly a Roman Catholic wife Margaret O'Flaherty, daughter of Murrough O'Flaherty, Chief of Iar Connacht, and they had a son, Thomas, the first Baronet. She feared that the boy would be raised a Protestant and ran away with him, raising him as a strict Roman Catholic. Lord Esmonde then repudiated Margaret and made a second marriage to Ellice Butler. As he would not admit his son's legitimacy (even though he had no son by his second marriage) Thomas was not allowed to succeed to the barony, which became extinct on his father's death in 1646. He did however gain possession of the family estates in County Wexford.

Several of the later baronets enjoyed distinguished political careers. The ninth and tenth Baronets represented Wexford and County Waterford respectively in the House of Commons, the ninth additionally serving as High Sheriff of Wexford in 1840. The eleventh Baronet was also a Member of Parliament as well as a Senator of the Irish Free State. The twelfth Baronet was Cumann na nGaedheal TD for Wexford from 1923 to 1936. The fourteenth Baronet was Member of Parliament for Tipperary North from 1915 to 1918 and Fine Gael TD for Wexford from 1937 to 1944 and from 1948 to 1951. The fifteenth Baronet was Fine Gael TD for Wexford from 1951 to 1973. The sixteenth Baronet was a Circuit Court judge who had been Fine Gael TD for Wexford from 1973 to 1977. John Joseph Esmonde, father of the fourteenth and fifteenth Baronets, was also a politician. Two of his sons from his second marriage also gained prominence. John Witham Esmonde (1907–1983) was a captain in the Royal Navy while Eugene Esmonde was a pilot in the Fleet Air Arm and recipient of the Victoria Cross and also the DSO. He received the Victoria Cross posthumously after he was killed in action in 1942. Their uncle, Thomas Esmonde received a Victoria Cross for an act of heroism in the Crimean War. The Esmonde family are one of very few families to have received two Victoria Crosses.

The family seat is Ballynastragh, Gorey, County Wexford.

== Esmonde baronets, of Ballynastragh (1629) ==
Esmonde baronets
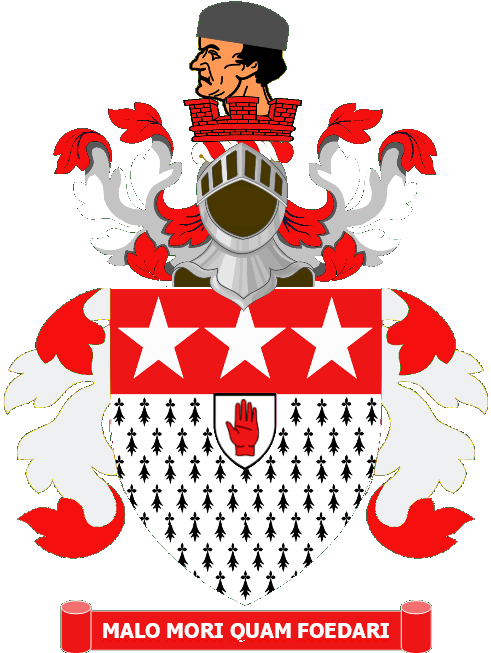
- Crest: Out of a mural crown Gules a head in profile wearing a helmet all Proper.
- Shield: Ermine on a chief Gules three mullets Argent.
- Motto: Malo Mori Quam Foedari (Had Rather Die Than Be Dishonoured)

- Sir Thomas Esmonde, 1st Baronet (died c. 1665)
- Sir Laurence Esmonde, 2nd Baronet (died 1688)
- Sir Laurence Esmonde, 3rd Baronet (died c. 1717)
- Sir Laurence Esmonde, 4th Baronet (died 1738)
- Sir John Esmonde, 5th Baronet (died 1758)
- Sir Walter Esmonde, 6th Baronet (died 1766)
- Sir James Esmonde, 7th Baronet (1701–1766)
- Sir Thomas Esmonde, 8th Baronet (died 1803)
- Sir Thomas Esmonde, 9th Baronet (1786–1868)
- Sir John Esmonde, 10th Baronet (1826–1876)
- Sir Thomas Henry Grattan Esmonde, 11th Baronet (1862–1935)
- Sir Osmond Thomas Grattan Esmonde, 12th Baronet (1896–1936)
- Sir Laurence Grattan Esmonde, 13th Baronet (1863–1943)
- Sir John Lymbrick Esmonde, 14th Baronet (1893–1958)
- Sir Anthony Charles Esmonde, 15th Baronet (1899–1981)
- Sir John Henry Grattan Esmonde, 16th Baronet (1928–1987)
- Sir Thomas Francis Grattan Esmonde, 17th Baronet (1960–2021)

The baronetcy is vacant as at 26 November 2021.

- Sir Sean Vincent Grattan Esmonde (born 1989) has yet to prove succession.

== See also ==
- Baron Esmonde
