= Richard Warburton (disambiguation) =

Sir Richard Warburton (died 1610) was an English Member of Parliament.

Richard Warburton may also refer to:

- Richard Warburton (died 1716), Member of Parliament for Portarlington (Parliament of Ireland constituency)
- Richard Warburton (died 1717), Member of Parliament for Ballyshannon (Parliament of Ireland constituency)
- Richard Warburton (died 1747), Member of Parliament for Portarlington and Ballynakill (Parliament of Ireland constituency)
- Richard Warburton (died 1771), Member of Parliament for Queen's County (Parliament of Ireland constituency)
- Richard Warburton Lytton (1745–1810), English landowner
