= John Dawson, 1st Earl of Portarlington =

Anglo-Irish politician and peer (1744–1798)

The Right Honourable The Earl of Portarlington PC (Ire)

Member of Parliament for Queen's County
- In office 1768–1779 Serving with William Pole, Charles Coote
- Preceded by: William Dawson; William Pole
- Succeeded by: John Warburton; Charles Coote

Member of Parliament for Portarlington
- In office 1766–1768 Serving with John Damer, Sir Roger Palmer, Bt
- Preceded by: George Hartpole; John Damer
- Succeeded by: William Henry Dawson; Sir Roger Palmer, Bt

Personal details
- Born: John Dawson; 23 August 1744 Northamptonshire, England
- Died: 30 November 1798 (aged 54)
- Spouse: Lady Caroline Stuart (m. 1778; died 1798)
- Children: 9
- Parent(s): William Dawson, 1st Viscount Carlow; Mary Damer

John Dawson, 1st Earl of Portarlington PC (Ire) (23 August 1744 – 30 November 1798) was an Anglo-Irish politician and peer.

== Early life ==
Dawson was born on 23 August 1744 in Northamptonshire, England. He was the only surviving son of William Dawson, 1st Viscount Carlow and Mary Damer. His sister, Hon. Mary Dawson, married Col. Mervyn Archdall, Governor of Fermanagh.

His paternal grandparents were Ephraim Dawson, an MP for Portarlington and Queen's County in the Irish House of Commons who was a successful banker who acquired an estate at Portarlington, County Laois, and the former Anne Preston (daughter of Samuel Preston). His maternal grandfather was Joseph Damer and his uncle was Joseph Damer, 1st Earl of Dorchester.

== Career ==
Between 1766 and 1768 he was a Member of Parliament for Portarlington in the Irish House of Commons. In 1768 he was elected to represent Queen's County. He resigned his seat in the Commons upon succeeding to his father's peerage in 1779 and assumed his seat in the Irish House of Lords. On 21 June 1785, Dawson was created Earl of Portarlington in the Peerage of Ireland. Between 1779 and his death he was Governor of Queen's County. He raised the Queen's County Militia, being appointed its first Colonel on 23 April 1793 and soon turning it into a well-regarded regiment. In 1796 he was made a member of the Privy Council of Ireland.

== Personal life ==
On 1 January 1778, he married Lady Caroline Stuart (1750–1813), the fifth daughter of John Stuart, 3rd Earl of Bute, who served as Prime Minister from 1762 to 1763, and Mary Wortley-Montagu, Baroness Mount Stuart of Wortley. Together they had five sons and four daughters, including:

- John Dawson, 2nd Earl of Portarlington (1781–1845), who had no issue and died unmarried.
- Lady Caroline Elizabeth Dawson-Damer (1782–1861), who married Henry Parnell, 1st Baron Congleton, son of Sir John Parnell, 2nd Baronet, in 1801.
- Lady Louisa Mary Dawson (1783–1845), who married Rev. Walter Davenport Bromley (who assumed the surname Bromley on inheriting Wootton Hall and Baginton from a distant relation in 1822), son of Davies Davenport, in 1829.
- Hon. Henry Dawson-Damer (1786–1841), a Captain in the Royal Navy who married Eliza Moriarty, daughter of Capt. Edmund Joshua Moriarty and Lady Lucy Luttrell (daughter of the 1st Earl of Carhampton), in 1813.
- Hon. George Lionel Dawson-Damer (1788–1856), a Colonel and MP for Portarlington and Dorchester; he married Mary Georgiana Emma Seymour, daughter of Admiral Lord Hugh Seymour and Lady Anne Horatia Waldegrave (daughter of the 2nd Earl Waldegrave and Maria Walpole, later Duchess of Gloucester), in 1825.
- Lady Mary Harriet Dawson (c. 1790–1827), who married Very Rev. Hon. Henry David Erskine, son of Thomas Erskine, 1st Baron Erskine, in 1813.
- Hon. Lionel Charles Dawson (1790–1842), who married Lady Elizabeth Emily Nugent, daughter of George Nugent, 7th Earl of Westmeath and Lady Elizabeth Emily Moore (daughter of the 1st Marquess of Drogheda), in 1820.
- Hon. William Mackenzie Dawson (1793–1859), who married Patience Scott, daughter of Gen. Scott, in 1820. After her death, he married Louisa Frances Wright, daughter of S. T. Wright, in 1827. After her death, he married Julia Hopkinson, daughter of Capt. Hopkinson, in 1856.
- Lady Anna Maria Dawson (1795–1866), who died unmarried.

Lord Portarlington died on 30 November 1798. He was succeeded in his title by his eldest son, John.

=== Descendants ===
As his eldest son died unmarried with no issue, the earldom passed to his grandson, Henry Dawson-Damer (1822–1889), who married Lady Alexandrina Octavia Maria Vane, second daughter of Charles Vane, 3rd Marquess of Londonderry.

Parliament of Ireland
Preceded by George Hartpole; John Damer	Member of Parliament for Portarlington; 1766–1768; With: John Damer (1766–1768); Sir Roger Palmer, Bt (1768)	Succeeded by William Henry Dawson; Sir Roger Palmer, Bt
Preceded by William Dawson; William Pole	Member of Parliament for Queen's County; 1768–1779; With: William Pole (1768–1776); Charles Coote (1776–1779)	Succeeded by John Warburton; Charles Coote
Honorary titles
Preceded by The Viscount Carlow	Governor of Queen's County; 1779–1798	Succeeded by The Marquess of Drogheda
Peerage of Ireland
New creation	Earl of Portarlington; 1785–1798	Succeeded by John Dawson
Preceded by William Dawson	Viscount Carlow; 1779–1798	Succeeded by John Dawson
