= Lord Lieutenant of Queen's County =

Ceremonial officer in Queen's County, Ireland

This is a list of people who have served as Lord Lieutenant of Queen's County.

There were lieutenants of counties in Ireland until the reign of James II, when they were renamed governors. The office of Lord Lieutenant was recreated on 23 August 1831. Appointments to the position ended with the creation of the Irish Free State in 1922.

== Governors ==
- Charles Coote, 1st Earl of Mountrath: July–December 1661
- William Dawson, 1st Viscount Carlow: 1750–1779
- John Dawson, 1st Earl of Portarlington: –1774
- Charles Moore, 1st Marquess of Drogheda: 1774–1799; again in 1805
- William Wellesley-Pole, 1st Baron Maryborough: 1783–1831
- Charles Coote, 2nd Baron Castle Coote: –1823
- Thomas Cosby: –1831

== Lord Lieutenants ==
- John Vesey, 2nd Viscount de Vesci: 17 October 1831 – 19 October 1855
- John FitzPatrick, 1st Baron Castletown: 17 November 1855 – 22 January 1883
- John Vesey, 4th Viscount de Vesci: 28 March 1883 – December 1900
- Sir Algernon Coote, 12th Baronet: 28 December 1900 – 22 October 1920
- Sir Hutcheson Poë, 1st Baronet: 11 November 1920 – 1922
