= Stad =

Stad may refer to:

== Places ==
- Stad (peninsula) or Stadlandet, the westernmost point in mainland Norway
- Stad Municipality, a municipality in Vestland county, Norway (established 1 Jan 2020)
- Stad Ship Tunnel, a proposed ship tunnel through the Stad peninsula in Norway
- Stad (Sweden), a former city designation in Sweden

== Other uses ==
- Student teams-achievement divisions (or "Student team achievement division"), a cooperative learning classroom technique

== See also ==
- An Stad, a former guest house in Dublin, Ireland
