= North Frederick Street =

Street in Dublin, Ireland

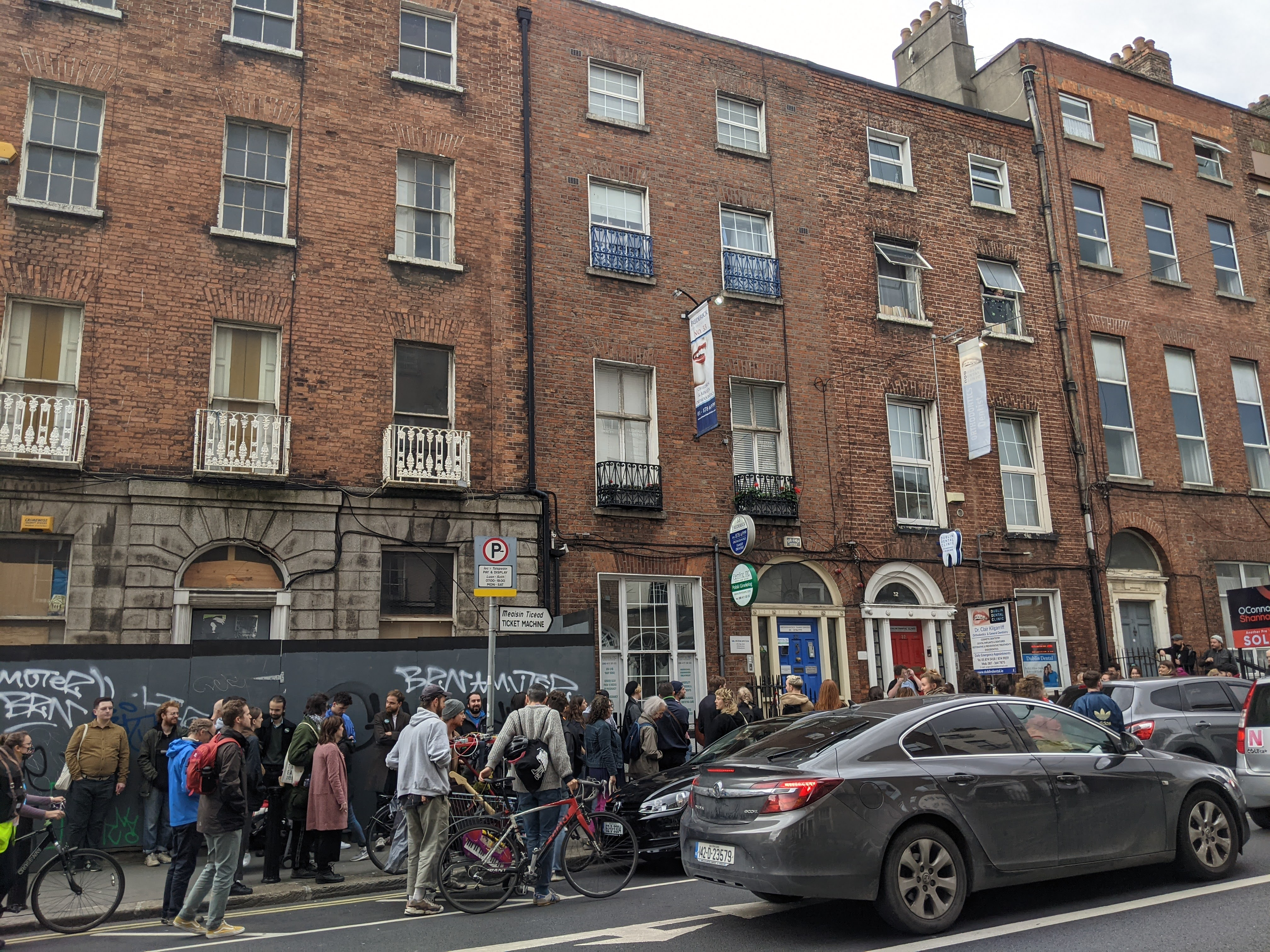
- Interactive map of North Frederick Street
- Native name: Sráid Fhreidric Thuaidh (Irish)
- Former name: Barley Fields
- Namesake: Frederick, Prince of Wales, Frederick Trench
- Location: Dublin, Ireland
- Postal code: D01
- Coordinates: 53°21′20″N 6°15′51″W
- north end: Dorset Street
- Major junctions: Hardwicke Street
- south end: Parnell Square

Other
- Known for: Georgian Dublin; An Stad; Artists studios Abbey Presbyterian Church

North Frederick Street (Irish: Sráid Fhreidric Thuaidh) is a Georgian street in Dublin, Ireland which connects Parnell Square East with Dorset Street. The street is intersected by Hardwicke Street and Gardiner Row.

== History ==
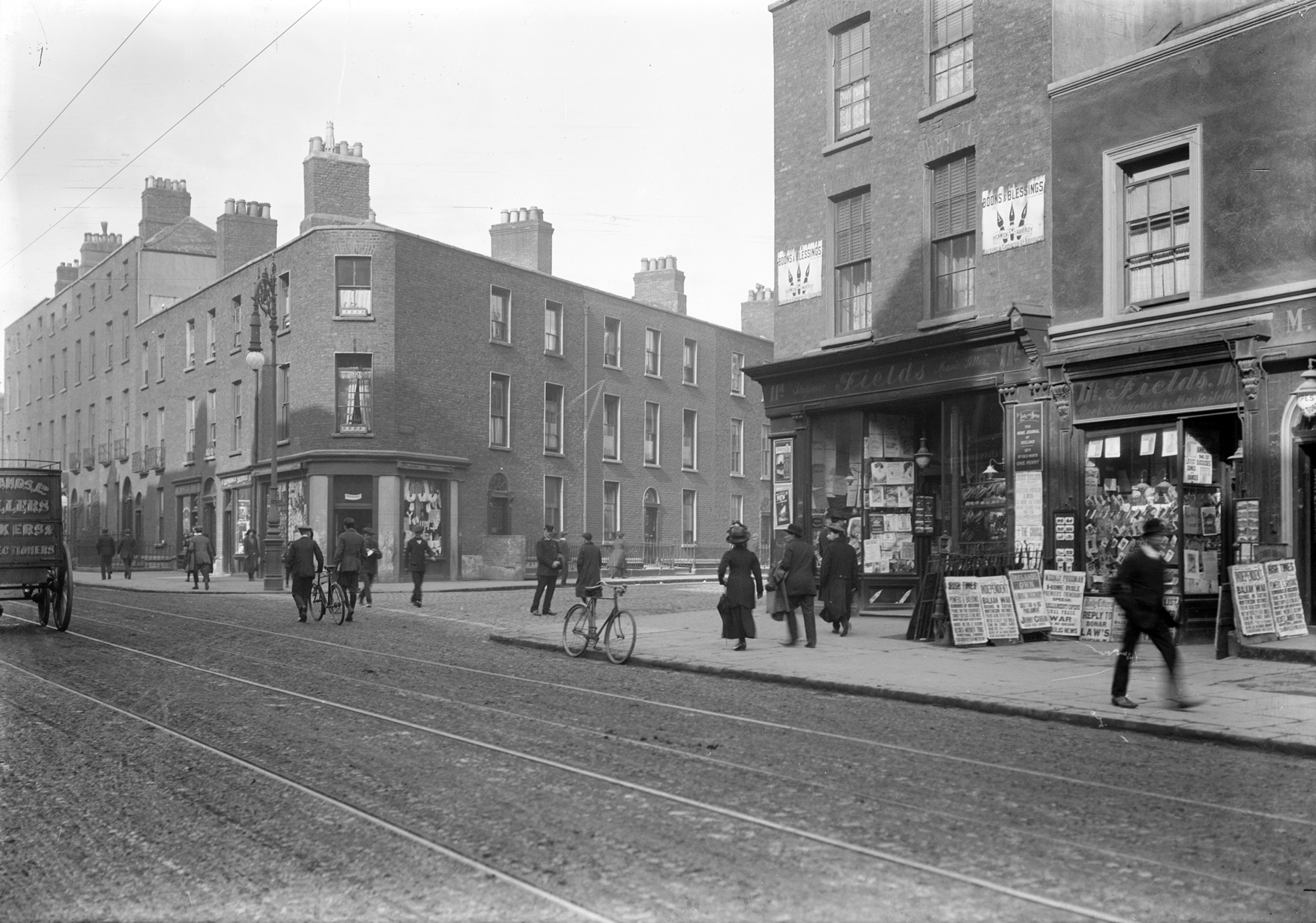
North Frederick Street corner with Hardwicke Street in 1912.

=== Naming ===
The street was likely named officially for Frederick the Great of Prussia. Although it is more likely that the chief developer, Frederick Trench, named it for himself before finding a suitable member of the royal family to ascribe it to. Another builder, Edward Jeeb was also responsible for constructing buildings on the street and was likely influential in the naming convention. Jebb's son, Dr Frederick Jebb, was Master of the Rotunda Hospital.

=== Development ===
Prior to its development, the area north of Parnell Square was noted on early maps as holding barley fields. After initial surveys were made by Thomas Sherrard of the Wide Streets Commission in 1789 and approved by the board in 1790, the land on either side of the street was later let as lots or sold for building in stages to developers and builders from 1793. The most significant of the developers and speculators included the wide street commissioner Frederick Trench who took ten lots for development on the west side of the street. Luke Gardiner, 1st Viscount Mountjoy was also involved in developing various houses on the street.

The street appears to have officially opened as a thoroughfare around 1793 with development starting from the northern end and stretching towards Palace Row (the north side of Parnell Square) over time. The majority of the original Georgian houses on the street are still in existence and were constructed mostly from 1790 to 1810. Most are 2- or 3-bay with 4 storeys over a raised basement. The smaller houses near the junction with Hardwicke Street were constructed a few years later around 1820-30 and are 3 storeys over basement, with ground floors at footpath level. Usually, a few houses were constructed together at a time, normally in pairs as less capital was required. Numbers 8 and 9 were built as a pair in 1805, 30 and 31 as a pair also around 1805, 2-5 were built around 1810 as a quartet and 6 and 7 as a pair around 1817.

=== 19th century ===
By the mid-19th century, many of the houses on the street were being used as solicitors' offices.

An Stad (Irish for 'The Stop') was founded on North Frederick Street in Dublin in the late 19th century by Cathal McGarvey, author of the traditional Irish song Star of the County Down, as a meeting place for nationalists and Irish language enthusiasts. The activities that took place at An Stad included early morning pro-Independence rallies, Irish language storytelling and even reviews in Irish of works of art.

Harry Clarke was born on the street in 1889 where his family had a stained glass business and he later had his studios on the street and lived in a flat at number 33.

=== 20th century ===
24-27 North Frederick Street were demolished and a 1980s office block was ultimately constructed in their place. The office was initially leased by Eircom from 1981 while from 1999 the lease was taken over by the Office of Public Works.

As of 2024, all of the remaining original Georgian houses on the street are listed as protected structures by Dublin City Council.
