= Sir Arthur Brooke, 1st Baronet =

Irish baronet & politician (1726–1785)

Sir Arthur Brooke, 1st Baronet PC (Ire) (1726 – 7 March 1785) was an Irish baronet and politician.

He was the son of Henry Brooke and his wife Lettice Burton, daughter of Benjamin Burton. Brooke was educated at Trinity College Dublin and graduated with a Bachelor of Arts in 1746. He was appointed High Sheriff of Fermanagh in 1752, and became later Governor of County Fermanagh. In 1761, Brooke was elected to the Irish House of Commons for County Fermanagh, a seat he held until 1783. Subsequently, he represented Maryborough until his death in 1785. On 3 January 1764, he was created a baronet, of Colebrooke, in the County of Fermanagh and on 15 May 1770, he was invested to the Privy Council of Ireland.

== Marriages and children ==
On 6 August 1751, he married firstly Margaret Fortescue, daughter of Thomas Fortescue and Elizabeth Hamilton. She died in 1756, and Brooke married secondly Elizabeth Foorde at The Palace in Clogher on 21 September 1775. By his first wife, he had two daughters and two sons. Brooke died on Sackville Street (Dublin). His sons having predeceased him, the baronetcy became extinct. His eldest daughter, Selina Elizabeth Brooke, married Thomas Vesey, 1st Viscount de Vesci. His younger daughter, Letitia Charlotte, married Sir John Parnell, 2nd Baronet: they were the parents of Henry Parnell, 1st Baron Congleton, and ancestors of the leading Irish statesman Charles Stewart Parnell.

Parliament of Ireland
Preceded by Nicholas Archdall; Henry Brooke	Member of Parliament for County Fermanagh; 1761–1783; With: Mervyn Archdall	Succeeded by Mervyn Archdall; Arthur Cole-Hamilton
Preceded by Sir John Parnell; Charles Henry Coote	Member of Parliament for Maryborough; 1783–1785; With: Charles Henry Coote	Succeeded by Frederick Trench; Charles Henry Coote
Baronetage of Ireland
New creation	Baronet (of Colebrooke); 1770–1785	Extinct
