= Eyre Coote (British Army officer, born 1762) =

British Army officer and politician (1762–1823)

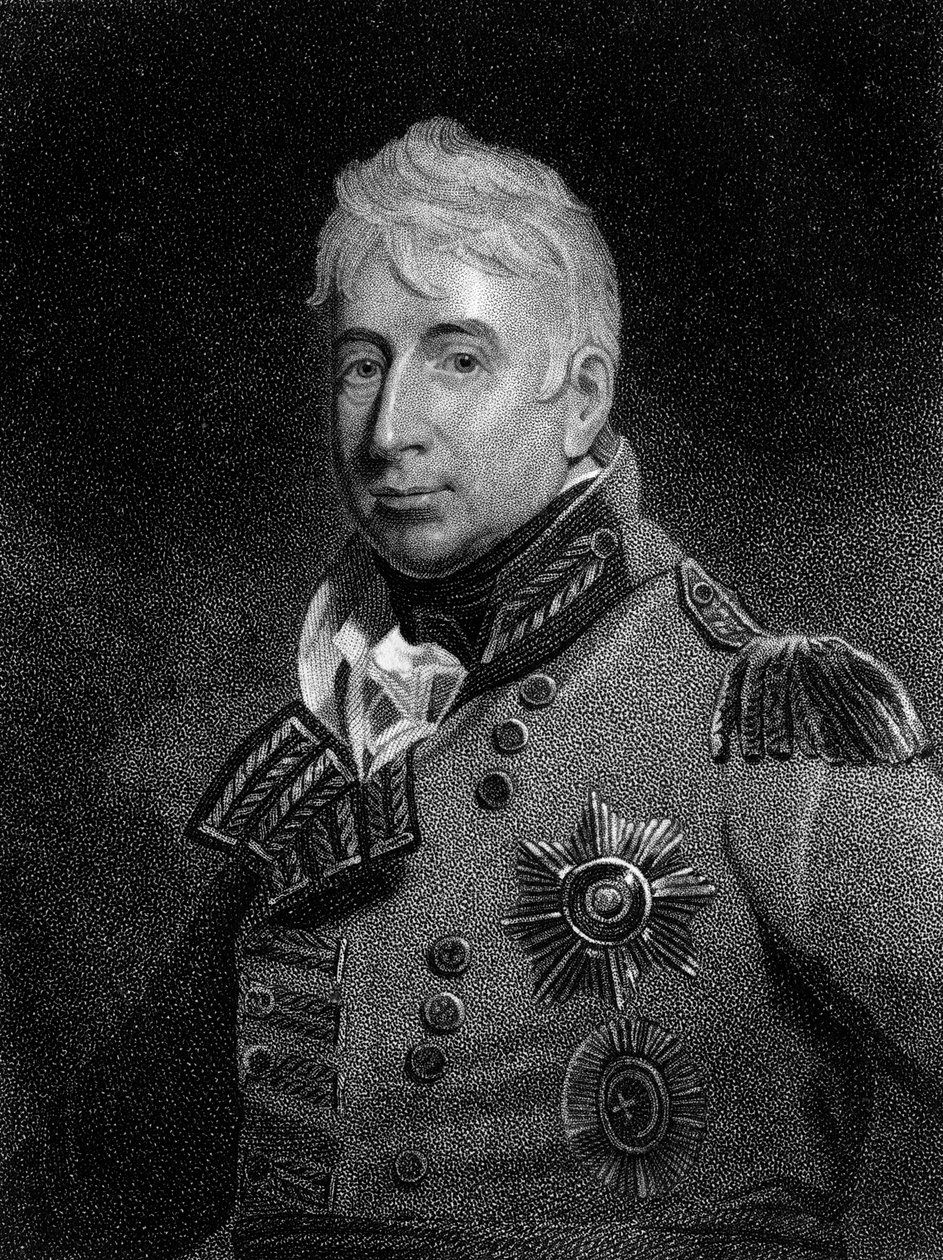
- 1837 portrait

Governor of Jamaica
- In office 1806–1808
- Preceded by: Sir George Nugent, 1st Baronet
- Succeeded by: William Montagu, 5th Duke of Manchester

Personal details
- Died: 10 December 1823 (aged 61)
- Spouses: Sarah Rodbard (1765–1795); Jane Bagwell
- Children: 8 (including Catherine, Sarah and Susannah and Eyre Coote)
- Parents: Charles Coote (1713 – 12 February 1776); Grace Tilson (d. 1767)
- Education: Trinity College Dublin
- Military career
- Allegiance: United Kingdom
- Branch: British Army
- Rank: General
- Conflicts: American War of Independence; French Revolutionary Wars

General Eyre Coote (20 May 1762 – 10 December 1823) was a British Army officer, politician and colonial administrator who served as the governor of Jamaica from 1806 to 1808. He attained the rank of general in the British army and was created a Knight Grand Cross of the Order of the Bath before being stripped of his rank and honours in 1816 after conduct unbecoming an officer and a gentleman.

== Early life ==
Eyre Coote was the second son of the Very Rev. Charles Coote (1713 – 12 February 1776), DD, Dean of Kilfenora and wife (m. 31 July 1753) Grace Tilson (- 1 January 1767), brother of Charles Henry Coote (1754–1823), who succeeded the last Earl of Mountrath as 2nd Baron Castle Coote in 1802, and nephew of Sir Eyre Coote, KB, the celebrated Indian General, to whose vast estates in England and Ireland he eventually succeeded.

== Career ==
=== Early career ===
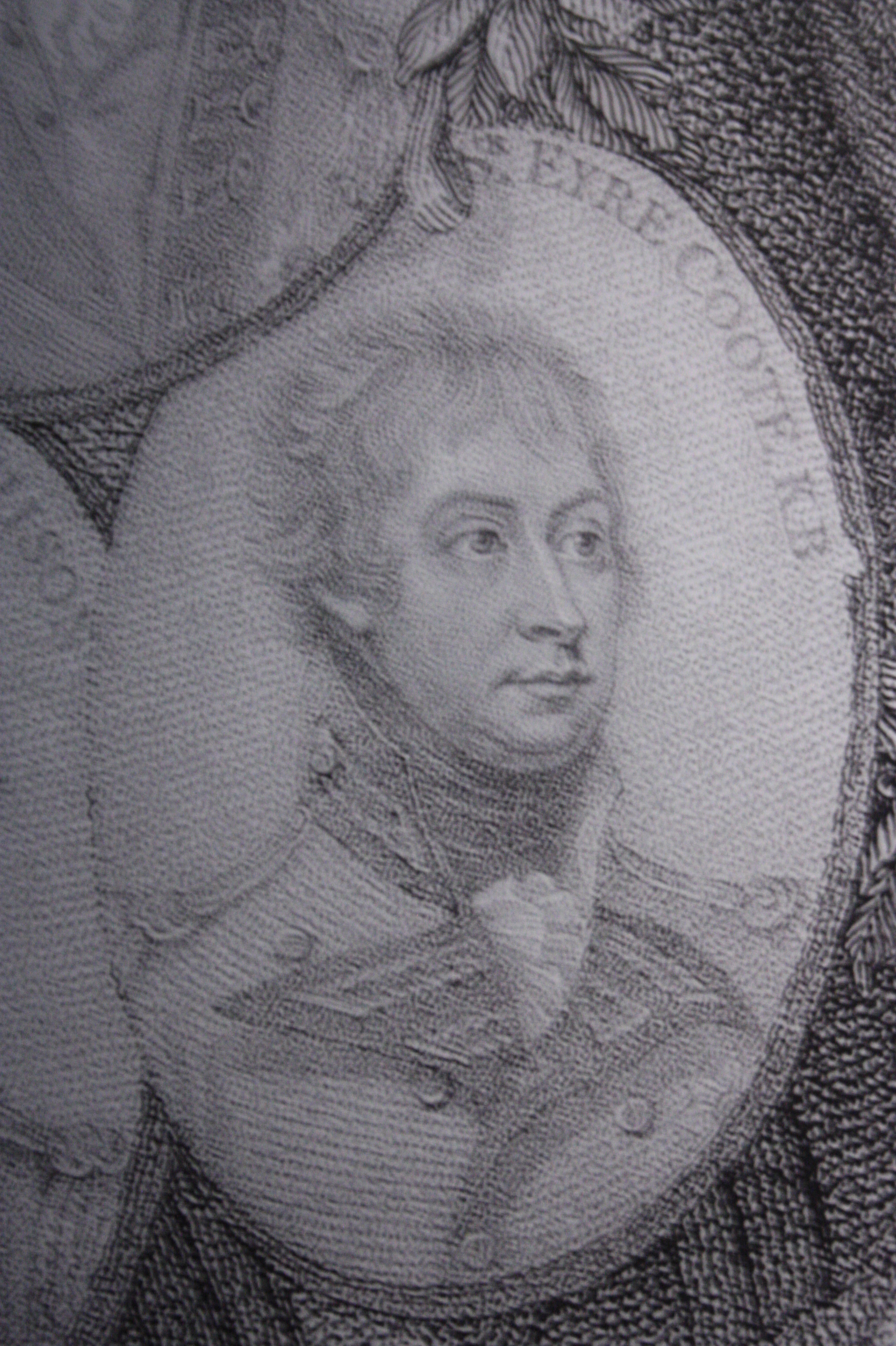
Sir Eyre Coote in 1801

Following studies at Eton and Trinity College Dublin, Coote purchased a commission in 1774 as an ensign in the 37th Regiment of Foot, of which his uncle Lieutenant- General Sir Eyre Coote was colonel.

His regiment embarked for North America to fight in the American War of Independence, and he carried the colours at the Battle of Long Island on 27 August 1776. He was then promoted lieutenant, and served with that rank at York Island, Rhode Island, the expedition to the Chesapeake, and the battles of Brandywine, Germantown, and Monmouth Court House. He was promoted captain on 10 August 1778, and served in the campaign in New York in 1779, at the siege of Charleston in 1780, and finally throughout Lord Cornwallis's campaigns in Virginia up to the capitulation of Yorktown, when he became a prisoner.

After his release he returned to England, and became major of the 47th Foot Regiment in 1783, and lieutenant-colonel of the 70th Foot in 1788. In 1793, on the outbreak of the war with France, he accompanied Sir Charles Grey on campaign to the West Indies in command of a battalion of light infantry, formed from the light companies of the various regiments in the expedition, and greatly distinguished himself throughout the operations there, and especially at the storming of the Morne Fortuné in Guadeloupe, for which he was thanked in general orders.

Coote was promoted colonel on 24 January 1794, and returned with Sir Ralph Abercromby in 1795 to the West Indies, where he again distinguished himself, and for his services was made an aide-de-camp to King George III. In 1796 he was made a brigadier-general, and appointed to command the camp at Bandon in Ireland, and on 1 January 1798 he was promoted major-general, and shortly after given the important command of Dover.

=== Deployments in Europe ===
As Coote held the Dover post he was appointed to command the troops employed in the expedition which had been planned by Sir Home Popham to cut the sluices at Ostend, and thus flood that part of the Netherlands which was then in the possession of the French. The troops were only thirteen hundred in number, and were successfully disembarked and cut the sluices as proposed on 18 May. A high wind off the land then sprang up, and the ships could not come in to take the troops off. French troops were hurried up, and the small English force was completely hemmed in, and after a desperate resistance, in which he lost six officers and 109 men killed and wounded, Coote, who was himself severely wounded, was forced to surrender. He was soon exchanged, and then returned to his command at Dover, but was summoned from it in 1799 to command a division in the Anglo-Russian invasion of Holland.

Coote's and Don's division formed Sir James Pulteney's column in the fierce battle of Bergen, but the successes of Pulteney's and Abercromby's columns could not make up for the failure of the rest, and Frederick, Duke of York had to sign the Convention of Alkmaar.

In 1800, Coote was appointed to command a brigade in the Mediterranean, and bore his part in the disembarkation of Sir Ralph Abercromby in Egypt and in the battles there of 8, 13, and 21 March. When Sir John Hutchinson, who succeeded Sir Ralph Abercromby, commenced his march to Cairo, Coote was left in command before Alexandria, and conducted the blockade of that city from April to August 1801. Coote appears as one of the Heroes of the Egypt Campaign in a commemorative engraving of 1802.

In the latter month General Hutchinson rejoined the army before Alexandria, and determined to take it. He ordered Coote to take two divisions round to the west of the city, and to attack the castle of Marabout, which commanded it. Victory at the Battle of Alexandria followed; Coote took Marabout after a stubborn resistance, and Alexandria surrendered. His services in Egypt were so conspicuous that Coote was made a Knight of the Bath, and also a knight of the new order of the Crescent by the Sultan.

Coote was appointed to command an expedition which was to assemble at Gibraltar for service against South America. This expedition, however, was stopped by the Peace of Amiens, and Coote returned to England, and in 1802 he was elected M.P. for Queen's County, in which he possessed large property inherited from the more famous Sir Eyre Coote (1726–1783). He had already represented, in the Irish House of Commons, Ballynakill (1790–1797) and Maryborough (1797–1800). He did not sit long in the House of Commons at this time, for in 1805 he was promoted lieutenant-general, and appointed lieutenant-governor and commander-in-chief of Jamaica. In April 1808, he resigned his government from ill-health, for the West Indian climate greatly tried his constitution and affected his brain.

Nevertheless, he was appointed second in command to Lord Chatham in 1809, when the Walcheren expedition was projected, and he superintended all the operations of the siege of Flushing until its surrender. His proceedings, however, were so eccentric during the expedition, that it was obvious that he could never again be trusted with a command.

=== Christ's Church affair and loss of honors ===
He was colonel of the 62nd Foot (1806–1810) and the 34th (Cumberland) Regiment of Foot (1810–1816), elected M.P. for Barnstaple in 1812, and promoted general in 1814. His conduct became more and more eccentric, and as "William Cooper" describes in his Flagellation and the Flagellants: A History of the Rod, (Note: William Cooper was a pseudonym of James Glass Bertram (1824–1892)) in November 1815, he entered Christ's Hospital school for boys and offered some boys money for an opportunity to flog them. After that he asked them to flog him and rewarded them with money. Caught by the school nurse, he was charged for indecent conduct. On 25 November 1815, he was brought up at the Mansion House before the Lord Mayor of London on the charge, and acquitted after "donating" £1000 to the school.

Although the case had been dismissed, the Duke of York, the commander-in-chief of the British Army, heard of these proceedings, and, in spite of strong representations from many distinguished officers, he directed Sir John Abercromby, Sir Henry Fane, and Sir George Cooke to report upon the matter. These three generals, after a long inquiry, reported that Coote was eccentric, not mad, and that his conduct had been unworthy of an officer and a gentleman. On 21 May 1816, Coote was removed from his regiment, dismissed from the army, and degraded from the Order of the Bath.

Outside of formal reproach, Coote also became subject of a satyrical cartoon depicting him as an anthropomorphic hog being whipped by students by George Cruikshank, an early caricaturist, and national humiliation.

Coote lost his seat in parliament at the dissolution of 1818, and died on 10 December 1823.

== Personal life ==
He had eight children with three women and was twice married: first to Sarah (1765–1795), daughter of John Rodbard, left three daughters, Catherine, Sarah and Susannah; and second to Jane, daughter of Col. John Bagwell, left one son, Eyre Coote. Sarah Rodbard is the subject of one of George Romney's paintings.

Coote also had four children with a Jamaican slave woman named Sally: Susan Coote, born 1812, William Coote, born 1807, John Coote, born 1812 and Henry Coote, born 1818. One of Susan Coote's descendants was US soldier and statesman Colin Powell.

== Notes ==
Parliament of Ireland
Preceded by John Egan; John Moore	Member of Parliament for Ballynakill; 1790–1798; With: John Tydd	Succeeded by Montagu Mathew; John Longfield
Preceded by Hon. John Vesey; Charles Henry Coote	Member of Parliament for Maryborough; 1798–1800; With: Henry Parnell	Succeeded by Edward Dunne; Henry Parnell
Parliament of the United Kingdom
Preceded by William Wellesley-Pole; Henry Parnell	Member of Parliament for Queen's County; 1802 – 1806; With: William Wellesley-Pole	Succeeded by William Wellesley-Pole; Henry Parnell
Preceded by William Taylor; William Busk	Member of Parliament for Barnstaple; 1812 – 1818; With: Sir Manasseh Masseh Lopes	Succeeded by Sir Manasseh Masseh Lopes; Francis Molyneux Ommanney
Government offices
Preceded by Sir George Nugent	Governor of Jamaica; 1806–1808	Succeeded by The Duke of Manchester
Military offices
Preceded by Sir George Nugent	Colonel of the 62nd (Wiltshire) Regiment of Foot; 1806–1810	Succeeded by Sir Samuel Hulse
Preceded by James Ogilvie	Colonel of the 89th Regiment of Foot; 1802–1806	Succeeded by John Whitelocke
