= Eyre Coote (MP) =

Member of Parliament for Clonmel
- In office 22 February 1830 – 15 December 1832

Personal details
- Born: 7 September 1806 Jamaica
- Died: 31 May 1834 (aged 27) Naples
- Party: Tory
- Parent: Eyre Coote (father)

Eyre Coote (7 September 1806 – 31 May 1834) was an Irish politician who was Member of Parliament (MP) for Clonmel from 1830 to 1832.

== Family ==
His father Eyre Coote, was an army officer. He was a member of the family of Baron Castle Coote.

== See also ==
- List of MPs elected in the 1830 United Kingdom general election
- List of MPs elected in the 1831 United Kingdom general election
