= Palmer baronets of Castle Lackin (1777) =

Extinct baronetcies of Ireland

Palmer baronets
- Creation date: 1777
- Status: extinct
- Extinction date: 1910
- Seat: Castle Lackin
- Motto: Sic bene merenti Palma, The palm to the deserving

The Palmer Baronetcy, of Castle Lackin in the County of Mayo, was created in the Baronetage of Ireland on 29 May 1777 for Roger Palmer. The fifth Baronet sat as Member of Parliament for County Mayo. The title became extinct on his death in 1910.

== Palmer baronets of Castle Lackin (1777) ==
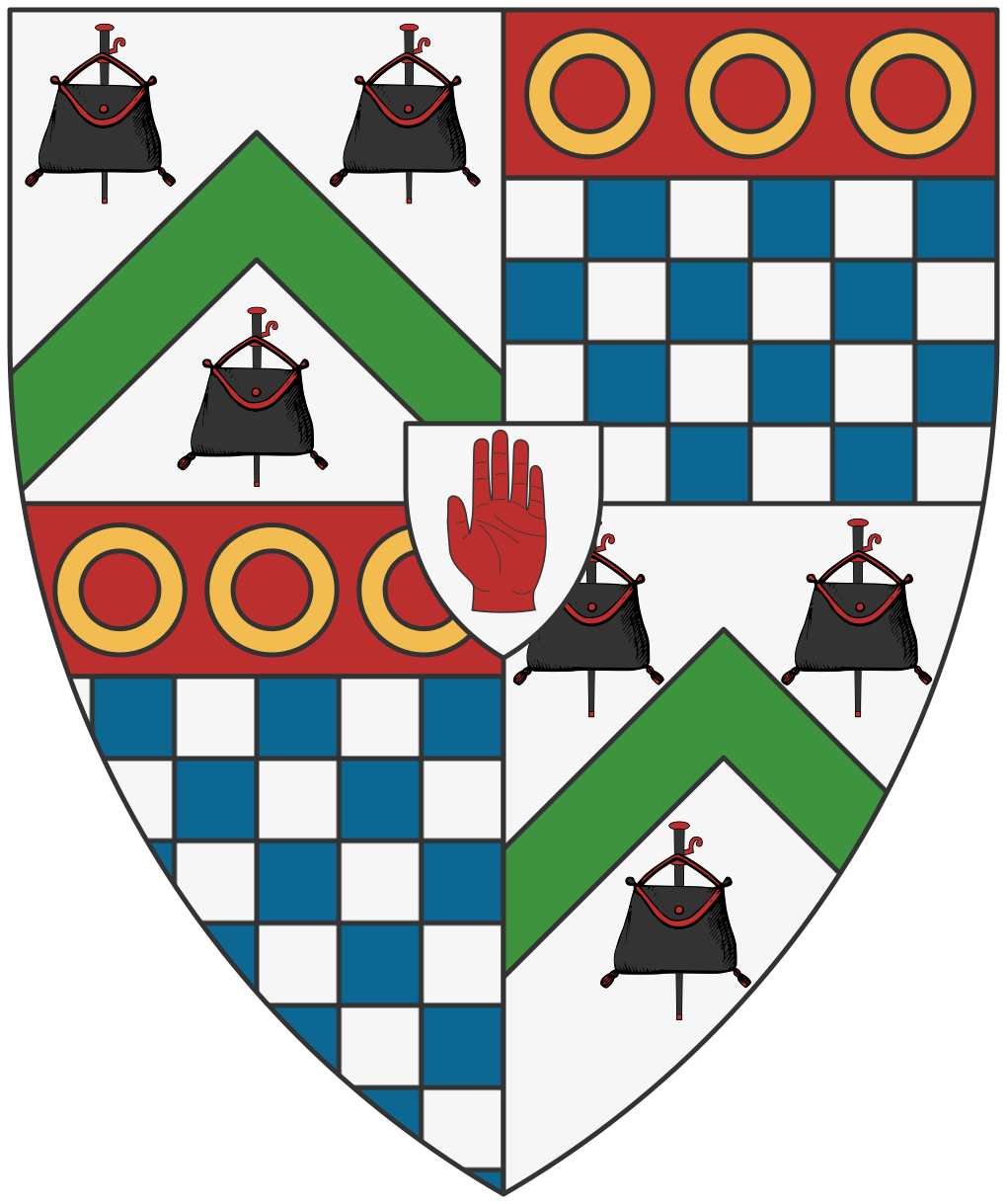
The coat of arms sometimes used by the Palmer baronets."

- Sir Roger Palmer, 1st Baronet (1729–1790)
- Sir John Roger Palmer, 2nd Baronet (died 1819)
- Sir William Henry Palmer, 3rd Baronet (died 1840)
- Sir William Henry Roger Palmer, 4th Baronet (1802–1869)
- Sir Roger William Henry Palmer, 5th Baronet (1832–1910). He died without an heir, and the baronetcy was then extinct.

Coat of arms of Arms of Palmer of Castle Lackin
Crest An arm embowed vested az. cuffed or, grasping a tilting-spear ppr. Escutcheon Arg. a chevron vert between three palmer's staves and scrips sa. garnished gu. Motto Sic bene merenti Palma

== See also ==
- Palmer baronets
