= Patrick Trant =

Anglo-Irish politician and Jacobite

Sir Patrick Trant (c. 1640 – 1694), known as Sir Patrick Trant, 1st Baronet between 1686 and 1691, was an Anglo-Irish politician and Jacobite.

== Biography ==
Trant was the son of Richard Trant. He operated from London as an agent to Barbados and the Leeward Islands for Sir William Stapleton, 1st Baronet. In 1684 he was an Irish Commissioner of Excise and in 1686 he was knighted by James II of England. That same year he was created a baronet, of Portarlington in the Baronetage of Ireland and served a year as High Sheriff of Kildare. By this time he had amassed an estate of over 10,500 acres (4,200 ha) in Ireland.

Following the Glorious Revolution, Trant remained loyal to James II. He was the Member of Parliament for Queen's County in the Irish House of Commons in the Patriot Parliament of 1689. On 10 April 1690, Trant was appointed a tax assessor for County Kildare and the Queen's County. Following the conclusion of the Williamite War in Ireland, Trant was attainted by William III of England, losing his baronetcy and entire estate. A patent which would have made Trant a baron in the Jacobite peerage as Lord Maryborough was found in Dublin, waiting to be signed by the now-exiled James II. Trant died three years later in France having fled to the country with James II.

Trant married Helen Nagle, a relative of Sir Richard Nagle, and they had five sons and three daughters. His brother, Dominick, married a sister of Sir Stephen Rice.

Parliament of Ireland
Preceded by Thomas Pigott; Daniel Hutchinson	Member of Parliament for Queen's County; 1689; With: Edmond Morres	Succeeded by John Weaver; John Weaver
Baronetage of Ireland
New creation	Baronet (of Portarlington); 1686–1691	Forfeit
