= John Dawson, 2nd Earl of Portarlington =

British Army officer

The Right Honourable The Earl of Portarlington
- Died: 28 December 1845 (aged 64); Lambeth, London
- Burial place: Kensal Green Cemetery
- Military career
- Allegiance: United Kingdom
- Branch: British Army
- Service years: 1798–1845
- Rank: Colonel
- Units: 46th Regiment of Foot; 23rd Light Dragoons; 10th Regiment of Foot
- Conflicts: French Revolutionary Wars; Anglo-Russian Invasion of Holland; Napoleonic Wars; Hanover Expedition; Peninsular War; Battle of Talavera; Hundred Days; Battle of Quatre Bras; Battle of Waterloo

Colonel John Dawson, 2nd Earl of Portarlington (26 February 1781 – 28 December 1845) was a British Army officer who fought in the Napoleonic Wars.

== Family ==
He was the son of John Dawson, 1st Earl of Portarlington (1744–1798) who had been created Earl of Portarlington in 1785. His mother was Lady Caroline Stuart (before 1763–1813) the fifth daughter of John Stuart, 3rd Earl of Bute.

== Career ==
He began his career as an ensign in the 20th Foot in March 1798 and was promoted to Lieutenant in December of the same year. On 24 March 1800 he was promoted to captain in the 46th Foot before transferring to the 23rd Light Dragoons. After a spell as a major in the 4th Garrison Battalion and as a lieutenant colonel in the 10th Foot he returned to the 23rd Dragoons on 6 April 1809. Dawson served during the Peninsular Campaign and at the Battle of Talavera.

=== Waterloo campaign ===
After commanding his regiment at the Battle of Quatre Bras on 16–17 June 1815, Dawson failed to appear at the head of his dragoons on the morning the Battle of Waterloo a day later. The reason for his non-appearance is unknown but it has been speculated that he was advised not to go by a surgeon, that "he had betaken himself that same evening to Brussels or elsewhere." or through "the negligence of a servant, who from oversleeping himself was unable to call his master sufficiently early to be in readiness to discharge the proper duties of his military rank." Although he joined the 18th Hussars towards the end of the battle and took part in Major General Sir Hussey Vivian's decisive charge, he resigned from the army shortly afterwards.

== Later career ==
Owing to his friendship with "Prinnie", the Prince Regent, later King George IV, he was offered a cornetcy in the 23rd Dragoons, which he accepted and became and aide-de-camp to the king with the automatic rank of colonel.

== Death ==
Dawson died at his residence in the Kennington Road in Lambeth, London, on 28 December 1845. He is deposited in Catacomb B in Kensal Green Cemetery, London.

As he was unmarried and had no issue, the earldom passed to his nephew Henry Dawson-Damer, 3rd Earl of Portarlington (1822–1889).

Peerage of Ireland
| Preceded by John Dawson | Earl of Portarlington; 1798–1845 | Succeeded by Henry Dawson-Damer |
