= Portarlington (Parliament of Ireland constituency) =

Pre-1801 Irish constituency

- Former borough constituency for the Irish House of Commons
- County: Queen's County
- Borough: Portarlington

–1801
- Replaced by: Portarlington (UKHC)

Portarlington was a parliamentary borough partly in King's County (in the twentieth century renamed County Offaly) but mostly in Queen's County (now County Laois). It returned two members to the Parliament of Ireland, from 1692 until the Union of Ireland and Great Britain on 1 January 1801.

== Boundaries ==
Samuel Lewis (writing in 1837) described Portarlington as "a borough, market, and post-town, partly in the parish of Clonehorke, barony of Upper Philipstown, King's County, but chiefly in the parish of Lea, barony of Portnehinch, Queen's County, and province of Leinster, 9½ miles (N.E.) from Maryborough, and 34½ (W. S. W.) from Dublin; containing 3091 inhabitants. This place, anciently named Coltodry, or Cooletetoodra, corrupted into Cooletooder, as it is still sometimes called, derives its present appellation from Lord Arlington, to whom, with a large extent of country, it was granted in the reign of Chas. II.; and its prefix from a small landing-place on the river Barrow, on which it is situated. Its only claim to antiquity attaches to the decayed castle and village of Lea, in the neighbourhood, the town of Portarlington having arisen only since the grant above named, which included a charter of incorporation constituting it a borough, though then only in its infancy. Lord Arlington subsequently disposed of his interest in the town to Sir Patrick Trant, upon whose attainder, as a follower of James II., the possessions became forfeited to the Crown and were granted by William III. to Gen. Rouvigny, one of his companions in arms, whom he created Earl of Galway. The Earl settled here a colony of French and Flemish Protestant refugees, and though the estates were taken from him by the English act of resumption, yet the interest which the new settlers had acquired by lease was secured to them by act of parliament in 1702, and they were made partakers of the rights and privileges of the borough. The estates which had been sold to the London Hollow Sword Blade Company, passed from them to the Dawson family, now Earls of Portarlington, by purchase, since which time the town has attained a very considerable degree of prosperity. The French language continued to be spoken among the refugees for a considerable time, with services in French till the 1820s, but by 1837 the Huguenots were scarcely to be distinguished from the other inhabitants, except where their names afford evidence of their foreign extraction.

The town is pleasantly situated on the river Barrow, by which it is divided into two portions, and which, in an easterly direction, makes a sweep round that portion which is in Queen's county, forming a tongue of land on which is a large square with a market-house in the centre. It consists principally of one main street, which forms part of the Dublin road by Monastereven, and enters the market-place on the south, and being continued at a right angle from the market-place on the west, is carried by a bridge over the river through that part which is in King's county; and at the western extremity of the town branches off on the north-west, forming the road to Clonegown, and on the south-west to Mountmellick. A short street on the north side of the square leads over another bridge into the road to Rathangan and Edenderry, and on the east of the square are various ranges of building. The streets are well formed, the roadway being made and repaired with broken stone, and the footpaths partly flagged and partly paved; the inhabitants are amply supplied with water from pumps, which are very numerous; the houses are well built, and the external appearance of the town is superior to any of the same size in the county; the whole number of houses is 485. It is principally inhabited by private families, as a pleasant place of residence, and as affording, from the number and high reputation of its scholastic establishments, great facilities for public education. Above the Tholsel, or Town-house, are three rooms, the largest of which is occasionally appropriated as an assembly-room; a reading-room is well supported by subscription. There is a small manufactory for tobacco, and another for soap and candles; the only trade is merely what is requisite for the supply of its numerous respectable inhabitants. A branch of the Dublin Grand Canal from Monastereven to Mountmellick passes close to the town. There are two markets, one on Wednesday by charter, and the other on Saturday by custom; they are well supplied with butchers' meat and provisions, and occasionally with fish. Fairs, four of which are by charter and four of recent appointment by act of parliament, are held annually on 5 January, 1 March, 22 May, Easter-Monday, 4 July, 1 September, 12 October, and 22 November, for cattle, horses, sheep, and pigs. A chief constabulary police station has been established here in the Queen's county part of the town, and a station also on the King's county side.

== History ==
By charter of incorporation granted by Charles II, in 1667, the government of the borough is vested in a sovereign, twelve burgesses, two portreeves, and as many freemen as the burgesses may choose to nominate. The sovereign is elected annually from among the burgesses; and a recorder, who may be either a burgess or not, is appointed by the Earl of Portarlington; the appointment of freemen has been for some time discontinued, and there is at present only one. The borough by its charter was empowered to return two members to the Irish parliament, which it continued to do from the year 1692 till the period of the Union; since which time it has returned one member to the Imperial parliament. The right of election, formerly vested in the corporation, was by the Representation of the People (Ireland) Act 1832, extended to the £10 householders; and as the ancient limits of the borough were but very imperfectly defined and had little relation to the elective franchise, a new boundary has been drawn round the town, comprehending an area of 933 statute acres, of which the limits are minutely detailed in the Appendix. The number of electors registered up to June 1836 was 202, of whom 189 were £10 householders and 13 resident freemen or burgesses: the sovereign is the returning officer; and he is also a justice of the peace within the precincts of the borough.

The lord of the manor has power to appoint a seneschal, and to hold courts leet and baron; and also a court of record, the former for the recovery of debts not exceeding 40s., and the latter for the determination of all pleas or actions wherein the debt or damage does not exceed the value of £200. There being no prison within the manor, all decrees or executions issuing from these courts are directed against the goods of the defendant; an appeal from the decision of these courts lies to the judge of assize on the circuit. The courts are held in a suite of rooms, well adapted to the purpose, above the market-house. Petty sessions are held every Wednesday in the market-house, at which six magistrates frequently attend.

Two churches were built in the town at the time of the settlement, dedicated respectively to St. Michael and St. Paul, in the reign of William III., and endowed severally with a rent-charge of £40 late currency reserved upon lands let in perpetuity; St. Paul's was appropriated to the French and Flemish settlers, and St. Michael's to the use of English Protestants in the town; in consequence of this arrangement the former of these is called the French church, and the latter the English. The income of the French church was augmented with £50 per ann. by parliament many years since; and the late Board of First Fruits increased the stipend of the minister of the English church to £100 per annum. It is in the diocese of Kildare, and in the patronage of the Bishop. The English church, situated on the eastern side of the square, has a handsome spire; the French church is in the street leading westward to the river, and till within the last twenty years divine service was performed in the French language. In the R. C. divisions Portarlington is the head of a union or district, called Portarlington, Emo and Killinard, and comprising parts of the parishes of Clonehorke and Coolbanagher, and the parish of Lea, with the exception of the townland of Inchcoolley. Chapels are respectively situated at Portarlington, Emo and Killinard: that in Portarlington having been found too small for the increasing congregation, a new chapel is now being erected near the old one, and, when finished, will be a handsome edifice in the pointed style; the principal front will consist of a tower, with pinnacles at each angle and surmounted with a fine spire, 140 feet high. There is also a place of worship for Wesleyan Methodists. Two free schools, one for boys and the other for girls, maintained by grants made by the Earl of Galway, are kept in a house that was once a boarding-school for young gentlemen: there are also two schools supported by subscription and aided by the Board of National Education, in which are about 160 children of both sexes; and a Sunday school, commenced many years since by some ladies of the town, and carried on by gratuitous teachers. A mendicity institution, with a fund of about £300 per ann., raised by subscription, has done much towards diminishing the pressure of extreme poverty in the town. A savings' bank, opened a few years since, has now a capital of deposits from the poorer classes, amounting to £6100. A loan fund, which commenced with a capital of £100, is operating very beneficially: Col. Armstrong, and Chidley Coote and Maunsell Dames, Esqrs., have taken an active part in its formation. A dispensary is supported in the usual manner. About a mile to the south of the town is Spire Hill, so called from the erection of an obelisk on it by the late Viscount Carlow, for the purpose of giving employment to the poor in a season of scarcity: the flatness of the surrounding country renders it visible at a great distance; the sides of the hill are richly wooded, and it has winding walks through the plantations to its summit. The more remarkable seats in the vicinity are Wood-brook, the residence of Major Chetwood; Indiaville, of Capt. C. L. Sandes; Lawnsdoun, of Lieut.-Col. Robt. Moore; Rathleix, of Jas. Dunne, Esq.; Doolagh, of M. Dames, Esq.; Garryhinch, of Chas. Joly, Esq.; Huntingdon, of Capt. C. Coote; Labergerie, of J. D. Clarke, Esq.; Barrow-bank, of J. W. Johnstone, Esq.; Annamoe, of Capt. Chas. Hendrick; Clonehurk, of H. Warburton, Esq.; and Benfield, of L. Dunne, Esq. A chalybeate spring in Mr. Shewcraft's grounds is said to be efficacious in scorbutic cases; its chief component parts are nitre and sulphur. Portarlington gives the title of Earl to the Dawson family."

== Members of Parliament ==
=== 1689–1801 ===
Election	First MP	Second MP
1689	Sir Henry Bond, Bt.	Sir Thomas Hacket
1692	Daniel Gahan	Richard Warburton
August 1695	Sir Joseph Williamson	Richard Warburton
1695	George Warburton	Richard Warburton
1703	Thomas Carter	Richard Warburton
1713	Ephraim Dawson	Richard Warburton
1715	Richard Warburton	Richard Warburton
1716	Richard Warburton	John Short
1723	Richard Warburton	Lancelot Sandys
1727	William Flower	George Johnston
1730	William Flower	William Stannus
1733	Lord George Sackville	William Henry Dawson
1761	George Hartpole	John Damer
1766	John Dawson	John Damer
1768	John Dawson	Roger Palmer
1769	William Henry Dawson	Roger Palmer
1771	Sir Thomas Butler, 6th Bt	Roger Palmer
1773	Joseph Dawson	Roger Palmer
1776	Hon. John Dawson	Roger Palmer
1777	Joseph Dawson	Roger Palmer
1783	John Scott	Thomas Kelly
1784	Sir Boyle Roche, 1st Bt	Robert Hobart
1790	Richard Cavendish	William Browne
January 1798	Sir John Parnell, 2nd Bt	John Stewart
1798	Frederick Trench	Thomas Stannus
1800	Frederick Trench	William Gregory
1801	Succeeded by Westminster constituency of Portarlington	

== See also ==
- Portarlington (UK Parliament constituency)
