= Sir John Parnell, 1st Baronet =

Irish politician

Sir John Parnell, 1st Baronet (c. 1720–1782), was an Irish politician and a baronet.

== Biography ==
He was the only son of John Parnell (1680–1727), Esq., MP and later Judge of the Court of King's Bench (Ireland), and Mary, sister of the Lord Chief-Justice William Whitshed. His uncle, the Rev. Thomas Parnell was the archdeacon of Clogher in 1705, prebendary of Dublin in 1713, vicar of Finglas in 1718, and poet, friend of Alexander Pope and Jonathan Swift.

He was appointed High Sheriff of Queen's County in 1753. He was a Member of Parliament (MP) for Maryborough in 1761, and was created a Baronet of Rathleague, Queen's County, on 3 November 1766. Sir John married Anne, second daughter of Michael Ward, of Castle Ward, County Down, one of the judges of the court of King's Bench in Ireland and Anna Catherine Hamilton, daughter of James Hamilton of Bangor, County Down. Anne was the sister of Bernard Ward, 1st Viscount Bangor.

Sir John Parnell died in 1782, and was succeeded by his only son, Sir John Parnell, 2nd Baronet, knight of the shire for the Queen's County, commissioner of the revenue in Ireland, Chancellor of the Exchequer, Privy Councilor, and Lord of the Treasury He was great-great-grandfather of Irish nationalist leader Charles Stewart Parnell.

== See also ==
- Baron Congleton

=== Bibliography ===
- Burke, Sir Bernard (1880). A Genealogical and Heraldic Dictionary of the Peerage and Baronetage. London: Harrison & Sons.
- Lodge, Edmund (1859). The Genealogy of the Existing British Peerage and Baronetage. London: Hurst and Blackett.
- O'Brien, R. Barry (1898). The Life of Charles Stewart Parnell. New York: Harper and Brothers.

Parliament of Ireland
Preceded by Eyre Coote; William Gilbert	Member of Parliament for Maryborough; 1761–1782; With: William Gilbert to 1764; Hunt Walsh 1764–76; Viscount Jocelyn 1776–78; John Tydd from 1778	Succeeded by John Tydd; Richard FitzPatrick
Baronetage of Ireland
New creation	Baronet (of Rathleague, Queen's County); 1766–1782	Succeeded by John Parnell
