= An Stad =

Historic building and meeting place in Dublin, Ireland

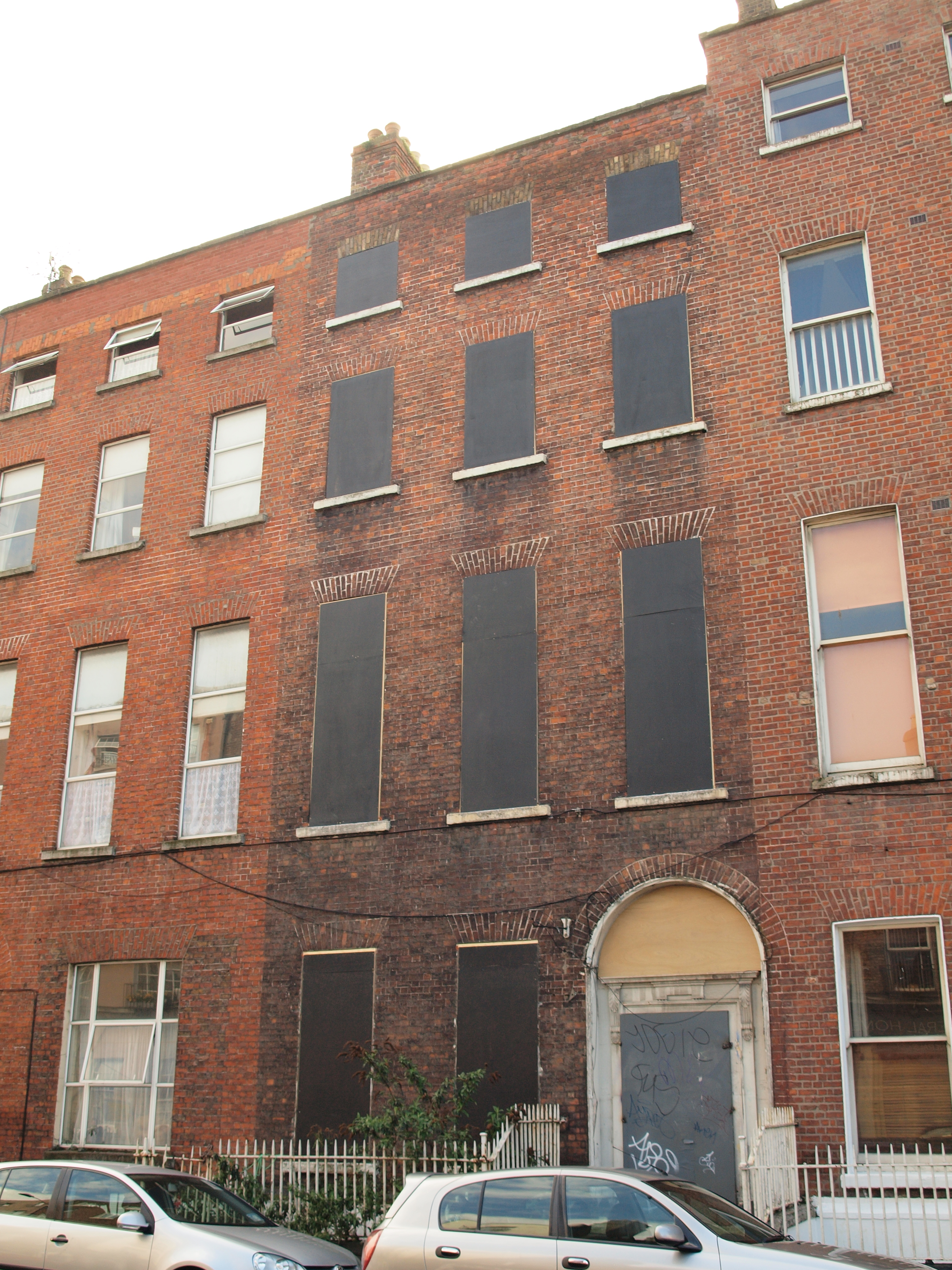
- Building which housed An Stad in April 2015.

- Location within Central Dublin

General information
- Status: Derelict
- Type: Hotel
- Location: 30 North Frederick Street, Dublin 1, Dublin, Ireland
- Coordinates: 53.3552°N 6.2645°W
- Completed: 1805

Technical details
- Floor count: 4 over basement

Design and construction
- Architect: Possibly Frederick Trench
- Developer: Luke Gardiner, 1st Viscount Mountjoy
- Main contractor: likely Henry Jebb

An Stad was a guest house located at 30 North Frederick Street, Rotunda, Dublin 1, which was frequented by notable historical figures, including Douglas Hyde, the first President of Ireland, Arthur Griffith, founder of Sinn Féin, author James Joyce, Gaelic Athletic Association (GAA) founder Michael Cusack, writer Brendan Behan and poet William Butler Yeats. It was a tobacco shop, guesthouse, restaurant and meeting place and its guests had wide-ranging influence over the Irish Nationalist movement, well-known works of literature and the development of Irish sport in the early 20th century. It has been located in various buildings on North Frederick Street, including 1B, 9 and 30 North Frederick street.

== Background ==
An Stad (Irish for 'The Stop') was founded on North Frederick Street in Dublin in the late 19th century by Cathal McGarvey, author of the traditional Irish song Star of the County Down, as a meeting place for nationalists and Irish language enthusiasts. The activities that took place at An Stad included early morning pro-Independence rallies, Irish language storytelling and even reviews in Irish of works of art.

== History ==
=== Early history ===
The house that contained An Stad from the 1920s to the 1990s was built based on a 1795 design ascribed to a builder or architect employed by Luke Gardiner, 1st Viscount Mountjoy.

The street was initially laid out by Thomas Sherrard of the Wide Streets Commission following surveys and planning carried out from 1789-90. Another one of the commissioners, Frederick Trench, took ten lots on the west side of the street for development from 1793 and it is likely that the building housing An Stad formed one of these lots. Trench likely also influenced the naming convention of the street although it may have officially been ascribed to Frederick, Prince of Wales and been influenced by its namesake Frederick Street on the South side of the city developed some decades earlier as well as to a fellow developer, Frederick Jebb who also built houses on the street.

=== The Cathal McGarvey Era ===
Just before 1900, An Stad began to influence the Gaelic revival and Irish nationalist movements. In the 1890s, Donegal native Cathal McGarvey (1866–1927) established a tobacconist and pub at 1B North Frederick Street. McGarvey was a well known humorist, storyteller and songwriter. Despite laws restricting the use of the Irish Language in business names, McGarvey insisted on naming his business "An Stad", Gaelic for "The Stop". He was fined 5 shillings. His reputation spread quickly, and soon people were coming to An Stad at night to hear him tell stories, to smoke and to promote the Irish language. McGarvey's literary capabilities, anti-British attitude and magnetic personality attracted a mix of a literary and pro-nationalist audience. Public functions including poetry readings, literary discussions and official Oireachtas week activities often went on until sunrise, and sometimes ended with early-morning Pro-Independence rallies emerging onto North Frederick Street. McGarvey also established a guesthouse on the premises which helped to attract athletic visitors from the Irish countryside coming to Dublin to watch or play in the adjacent Croke Park sports ground. Among his guests was Michael Cusack, founder of the GAA and the man after whom Croke Park's Cusack Stand was named. At McGarvey's Gaelic evenings at An Stad, ideas for promoting Nationalism and Independence were proffered aggressively, from Arthur Griffith promoting Sinn Féin to Douglas Hyde espousing the idea of ignoring the British and establishing an Irish system of rulership without direct war, to Michael Cusack promoting Gaelic Games as a unifying force behind the Nationalist movement, An Stad was a place of lively debate and ideas. Being a literary hub, An Stad is mentioned in the Biographies and works of several of its guests, including Oliver StJohn Gogarty, James Joyce and others.

McGarvey sold An Stad in 1905, but An Stad continued to serve as a center for lively Nationalist debate for some years after McGarvey's decision to move on. As the Abbey Theatre gained prominence in the early 20th century, An Stad's role as a literary centre gradually declined.

=== The Mollie Gleeson Era ===
However, as the Irish War of Independence broke out in 1919, An Stad played a pivotal role as a chief safehouse for republican activists including Michael Collins, Douglas Hyde, and Harry Boland, and is now a stop on Sinn Féin's 'Rebel tour of Dublin'.

In June 1916, Republican activist Mollie Gleeson came from Tipperary to Dublin and some time later she became the proprietor of at least three establishments in Dublin, including An Stad. Gleeson was an influential figure in the Republican movement, an unapologetic Nationalist and gun-runner, a fearless Republican who often asked British soldiers to help her carry her luggage on trains from Tipperary to Dublin without their knowing that she was carrying ammunition and weapons. She used her relationship with leaders like Sean Tracey, Dan Breen and most notably Michael Collins to make An Stad a Republican safehouse. Gleeson worked as an IRB spy by serving as a waitress at the West End Restaurant on Parkgate St., where British Officers and members of the Black and Tans were regular customers. She used intelligence from the restaurant to warn IRB members on Bloody Sunday, in 1920, that the British were on their way to Croke Park to exact revenge for the killing of British Intelligence officers earlier in the day. 12 civilians were killed in the incident, but due to Gleeson's intelligence, IRB members at the game were able to conceal their identities and escape with the crowd.

Under Gleeson's tutelage, An Stad continued to serve as a leading safehouse for Nationalists throughout the war of Independence. Sinn Féin and IRA members were regularly hidden at An Stad, and it was used as a transit point for weapons shipments, military orders, uniform manufacture, and the provision of food, clothing and shelter for soldiers. Gleeson was also an ardent feminist, and a leader in the Cumann na mBan movement. Several accounts in the Irish military archives list the bravery of Gleeson as she moved arms, ammunition and messages, co-ordinated Cumman na mBan activities, hid soldiers and did whatever was needed to get intelligence from British officers and Black and Tan soldiers.

During the Irish Civil War, Gleeson sided with anti-treaty forces, and she orchestrated an underground command center for the IRA and Cumann na mBan at An Stad. Gleeson was fiercely opposed to the Anglo Irish Treaty that ended the war of Independence, and was upset that the Irish Free State formally rejected feminism in order to keep the Catholic Church onside. She remained in charge at An Stad until shortly before her death in 1949. During this time, An Stad retained its role as a centre for the Gaelic Revival, with authors frequently reviewing works of poetry and prose in the Irish language. It retained this role at least until World War II. The 1921 Anglo-Irish treaty established an Irish "Free State" that retained the King of the United Kingdom as head of state, kept Ireland within the British Commonwealth and separated the six counties of Northern Ireland (which remained part of the UK) from the 26 counties of the Irish Free State. In 1938, a dissident Irish Republican Army (IRA) group, protesting that agreement, attempted unsuccessfully to destroy Nelson's Pillar on O'Connell Street in Dublin, less than a mile from An Stad. The IRA had long seen Nelsons Pillar as a symbol of continued partial British sovereignty in Ireland. The IRA activists used An Stad as their safehouse, the perpetrators staying at and storing the gelignite at An Stad. The plan was cancelled at the last minute. Nelson's Pillar was eventually destroyed in 1966, but there is no evidence that the bombers used An Stad as a safehouse at that time.

=== After Mollie Gleeson's Death ===
After the death of Mollie Gleeson, there is no evidence that An Stad had any more association with the nationalist movement. There are no known records about An Stad during the "Emergency" as World War II was known in Ireland, nor from the time of the "Troubles"

An Stad continued to operate as a guesthouse throughout the latter half of the 20th century, with Maureen Walsh (nee McCarthy) taking ownership of No.30 in 1937. Maureen married Laurence Walsh, who was a member of a prominent Republican family from Ballinabarney, County Wicklow. Their daughter Mary Anne never married and remained at the An Stad until her death.

=== Recent Developments ===
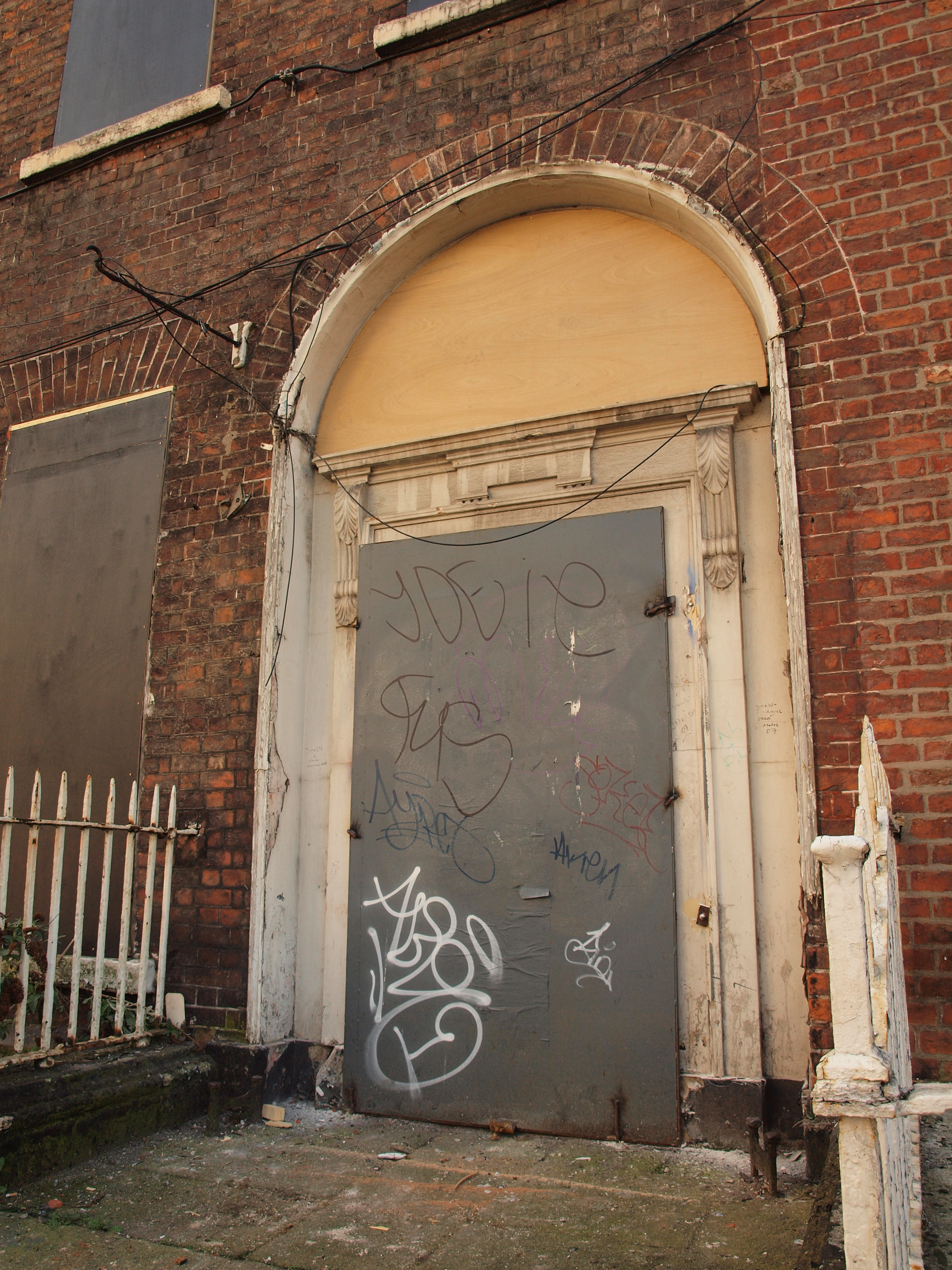
Doorway of 30 North Frederick Street in April 2015

30 North Frederick Street – the last location of An Stad – has been vacant since a fire broke out in the mid-1990s. It was placed on Dublin's 'derelict building' register in 2011. In June 2015, Dublin City Council intervened in an attempt to prevent the collapse of the building, after a large section of the back wall collapsed following years of neglect. They closed off northbound traffic on North Frederick Street and attempted to stabilize the structure to prevent outright collapse.

In 2023, it was announced that Dublin City Council applied to An Bord Pleanala for a compulsory purchase order to take possession of the property from the owner Patrick Walsh.

In July 2024, An Bord Pleanala, granted the application.

== The Guest Book ==
A guest book was maintained from 1900 to 1904. It is signed by Éamonn Ceannt, and makes reference to Seán T. O'Kelly, Maud Gonne and others. The original is long gone, but in his book 'An Stad-Croilar na hAthbheochana' (An Stad-The heart of the Renaissance), Sean O'Cearnaigh's copies of the original log are recorded in the Irish National Archives.

== Famous guests ==
=== James Joyce ===
James Joyce was a frequent guest of An Stad during his student years in Dublin. While many people tried to convince him of the value of the Gaelic revival and others tried to convince him of the value of the Nationalist movement, Joyce was interested in neither and deeply suspicious of both, and eventually left Ireland entirely. However, his time at An Stad did have one lasting influence on Irish Literary history. His character 'The Citizen' in his landmark novel Ulysses is based on Michael Cusack, whom Joyce met at An Stad. Several other patrons of An Stad, including Oliver St. John Gogarty, recall being impressed or influenced by Joyce.

=== Michael Collins ===
Michael Collins was a frequent guest at An Stad under different circumstances. After the Irish War of Independence broke out, Collins and other IRA/Irish Republican Brotherhood (IRB) members regularly hid at An Stad, and there are bullet holes in the house from a failed attempt by British agents to locate Collins in the house. Collins was very familiar with proprietor Mollie Gleeson, whom he asked to identify the body of Sean Treacy when he was killed by British agents in 1920. History books and personal accounts indicate that many different IRA agents under Collins's tutelage hid at An Stad when delivering messages or arms to Republican fighters. A Collins family lived at An Stad in the late 19th century, but they were not direct ancestors of Michael Collins. Anecdotally, in the film Michael Collins, during a scene where Collins and Harry Boland are seen cycling away from a British raid on leaders of Dáil Éireann, An Stad is visible in the background.

=== Douglas Hyde ===
As early as the 1890s, Douglas Hyde was advocating the cause of Irish Independence. According to An Stad regular Oliver St. John Gogarty, it was during his time at An Stad that Hyde first formulated his plan for an Irish Free State based on the idea of ignoring the British, an idea that later greatly influenced Éamon de Valera and formed the basis of the first Dáil. Hyde's idea was that if the elected Irish members of the British Parliament instead formed a parliament in Dublin and created their own system of courts and of policing society, Ireland could rid itself of British rule. Hyde is regularly mentioned by other guests and was one of the first later-famous Irish people who frequented An Stad. His views were influential on the other patrons who viewed him as a senior member. Hyde later became the first President of Ireland under the 1938 Constitution.

" I knew him since the days when his first movement for freedom began in An Stad" – Oliver St John Gogarty, on Douglas Hyde

=== William Butler Yeats ===
Referring to his time with William Butler Yeats at An Stad, Oliver St. John Gogarty said "I know no more beautiful face than 'Yeats when lit with song'" Yeats was a regular guest at An Stad as a young man in the late 19th and early 20th centuries. His desire to open a theatre for Irish theatrical endeavours came to fruition with the opening of the Abbey Theatre.

=== Michael Cusack ===
Michael Cusack, founder of the GAA, was a regular guest at An Stad and made a great impression on many of the people he met there including James Joyce and Oliver St. John Gogarty, both of whom wrote about their meetings with Cusack there. Cusack was a regular at nearby Croke Park, and influenced the An Stad crowd with his beliefs in the promotion of Gaelic games as a unifying influence over the nationalist movement. In later years, the Gaelic Games movement would indeed play such a role, with nationalists playing amateur Gaelic football and hurling in the Phoenix Park and more formal games at Croke Park. One of the most famous incidents of the Irish War of Independence was when British troops in an armoured vehicle entered Croke Park and fired on players and spectators, killing 13 spectators and one player. Cusack is also the inspiration for the character "The Citizen" in James Joyce's novel Ulysses

=== Arthur Griffith ===
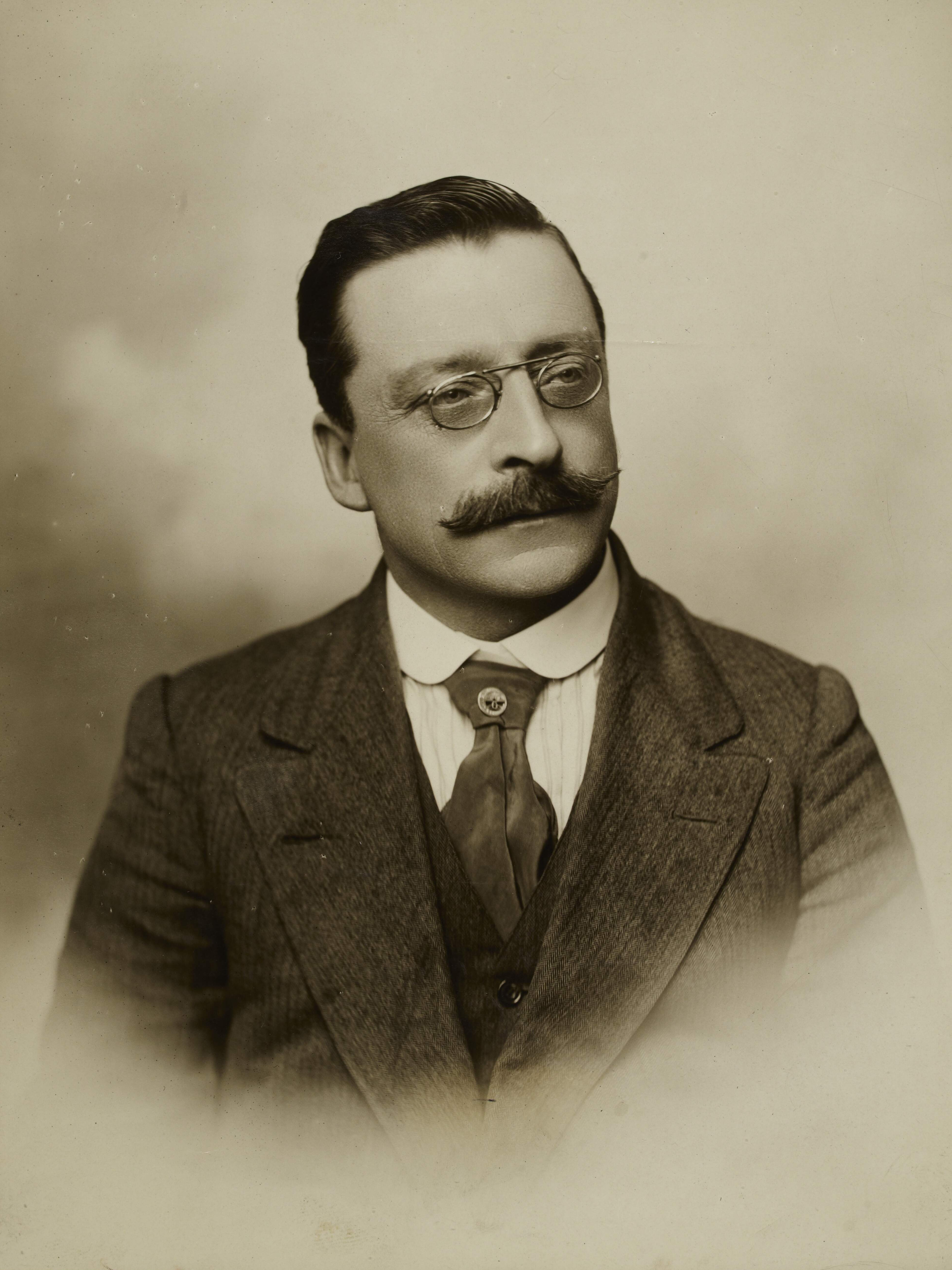
Arthur Griffith

Arthur Griffith, founder of Sinn Féin and leader of the delegation that negotiated the 1921 Anglo-Irish Treaty that established the 26-county Irish Free State, was a regular guest at Cathal McGarvey's Gaelic Language sessions at An Stad. Griffith was well-respected by the other patrons of An Stad, as recorded by Oliver St. John Gogarty, who said of him "We could all believe in Arthur Griffith". According to Gogarty, Griffith began visiting An Stad in its early days, before 1900. Griffith may have initially come to An Stad in pursuit of furthering his favoured early cause, the Gaelic League, but he had already formed a pro-Independence mindset. By continuing to attend McGarvey's late night sessions, Griffith could influence a mix of Gaelic Language Enthusiasts, Nationalists and people of influence. Not long after his documented time at An Stad, he founded Sinn Féin. Griffiths visits to An Stad overlapped with those of other nationalists such as Douglas Hyde, Michael Cusack and Éamonn Ceannt

=== William Bulfin ===
William Bulfin, best known for introducing Gaelic sports to Argentina, was a key writer for the United Irishman and a key international promoter of the Irish Independence cause. In 1902, he met at An Stad with McGarvey, Hyde, Griffith and others, and is credited with introducing the members of the United Irishman to the later founders of the Abbey Theatre

=== Seán O'Casey ===
Seán O'Casey, author of such plays as Juno and the Paycock and The Plough and the Stars was a regular at An Stad during the early 20th century

=== Seán T. O'Kelly ===
Seán T. O'Kelly was the second President of Ireland (1945–1959). He was a member of Dáil Éireann from 1918 until his election as president. During this time he served as Minister for Local Government (1932–1939) and Minister for Finance (1939–1945). He also served as deputy prime minister of Ireland from 1932 to 1945, under the title vice-president of the Executive Council from 1932 until 1937 and Tánaiste from 1937 until 1945. He is known to have stayed at An Stad

=== Éamonn Ceannt ===
Éamonn Ceannt was a founding member of the Irish Volunteers and a signatory of the Irish Declaration of independence in 1916. After the 1916 rising, Ceannt was held in Kilmainham Jail until his execution by firing squad on 8 May 1916, aged 34. Ceannt signed the An Stad guestbook in 1904.

=== Brendan Behan ===
Oliver St. John Gogarty opined that Brendan Behan was easy to prank, since he read poetry with his eyes closed. A regular occurrence at An Stad in Behan's day was for the entire crowd to sneak out during Behan's readings, leaving him alone when he opened his eyes at the end of his poems.

== Detractors ==
Besides the many nationalist and Irish language enthusiasts that lauded the An Stad movement, many were also opposed. The most noted of these was Padraig Pearse. While he is known to have visited An Stad, He felt that the tobacco and alcohol stained atmosphere tainted the purity of his republican ideal. According to Pearse's biographer, Brian P Murphy, many of the leaders of the 1916 rising, looking to create a puritanical state, felt it necessary to marginalize both the revelers at An Stad and the Gaelic Football players of the Phoenix Park, from their movement.
