= William Dawson, 1st Viscount Carlow =

Anglo-Irish politician and peer

William Henry Dawson, 1st Viscount Carlow (died 22 August 1779) was an Anglo-Irish politician and peer.

Dawson was the son of Ephraim Dawson of Queen's County and Anne Preston, daughter and heiress of Samuel Preston.

Between 1733 and 1760, Dawson was a Member of Parliament for Portarlington in the Irish House of Commons. In 1761 he was elected to represent Queen's County, which he did until 1768. He then sat for Portarlington again between 1769 and 1770. On 29 May 1770 he was raised to the peerage as Baron Dawson of Dawson's Court in the Peerage of Ireland, and Dawson assumed his seat in the Irish House of Lords. On 24 July 1776 he was further honoured when he was made Viscount Carlow, also in the Peerage of Ireland. Between 1750 and his death, Dawson was Governor of Queen's County.

On 8 December 1737, he married Mary Damer, daughter of Joseph Damer and sister of Joseph Damer, 1st Earl of Dorchester. They had five sons and three daughters. Dawson was succeeded in his title by his eldest son, John Dawson.

Parliament of Ireland
Preceded by William Flower; William Stannus	Member of Parliament for Portarlington; 1733–1760; With: Lord George Sackville	Succeeded by George Hartpole; John Damer
Preceded by Richard Warburton; George Evans	Member of Parliament for Queen's County; 1761–1768; With: William Pole	Succeeded by John Dawson; William Pole
Preceded by John Dawson; Roger Palmer	Member of Parliament for Portarlington; 1769–1770; With: Roger Palmer	Succeeded by Sir Thomas Butler, Bt; Roger Palmer
Honorary titles
Preceded by The Earl of Mountrath	Governor of Queen's County; 1750–1779	Succeeded by John Dawson
Peerage of Ireland
New creation	Viscount Carlow; 1776–1779	Succeeded by John Dawson
New creation	Baron Dawson; 1770–1779	Succeeded by John Dawson
