= Sir Roger Palmer, 1st Baronet =

Anglo-Irish politician

Sir Roger Palmer, 1st Baronet (1729 – 25 January 1790) was an Anglo-Irish politician.

Palmer was elected as a Member of Parliament for Jamestown in the Irish House of Commons in 1761. In 1768 he was returned for the Portarlington constituency, sitting for that seat until 1783. On 29 May 1777 he was created a baronet, of Castle Lackin in the Baronetage of Ireland.

Parliament of Ireland
Preceded by John Gore; Gilbert King	Member of Parliament for Jamestown; 1761–1768; With: Edward Loftus	Succeeded by James Browne; John FitzGibbon
Preceded by John Dawson; John Damer	Member of Parliament for Portarlington; 1768–1783; With: John Dawson (1768–1769); William Henry Dawson (1769–1771); Sir Thomas Butler, Bt (1771–1773); Joseph Dawson (1773–1776); Hon. John Dawson (1776–1777); Joseph Dawson (1777–1783)	Succeeded by John Scott; Thomas Kelly
Baronetage of Ireland
New creation	Baronet (of Castle Lackin); 1777–1790	Succeeded by John Roger Palmer
