= Maryborough (Parliament of Ireland constituency) =

Irish constituency until 1800

- Former borough constituency for the Irish House of Commons
- County: Queen's County
- Borough: Maryborough (now Portlaoise)

–1801
- Seats: 2

Maryborough was a constituency represented in the Irish House of Commons until 1800. The town has been known as Portlaoise since 1929.

== Members of Parliament ==
- 1585 Robert Gale, Thomas Lambyne and George Harvey
- 1613–1615 Sir Adam Loftus and Alexander Barrington
- 1634–1635 Sir Walter Crosbie, 1st Baronet and Sir William Gilbert
- 1639–1649 Sir Nicholas White (died and replaced 1644 by Henry Gilbert) and Sir William Gilbert
- 1661–1666 John Gilbert and George St George (sat for Leitrim and replaced 1661 by Alexander Pigott)

=== 1689–1801 ===
Election	First MP	Second MP
1689	Pierce Bryan	Thady FitzPatrick
1692	St Leger Gilbert	Periam Pole
1695	St Leger Gilbert	John Weaver
1703	St Leger Gilbert	Robert Pigott
November 1713	Gerald Bourke	Edward Dodsworth
1713	Robert Pigott	William Wall
1730	Warner Westenra	William Wall
1755	Warner Westenra	John Pigott
1755	Warner Westenra	Bartholomew William Gilbert
May 1761	William Gilbert	Eyre Coote
1761	William Gilbert	John Parnell
1764	Hunt Walsh	John Parnell
1776	Robert Jocelyn, Viscount Jocelyn	John Parnell
1778	John Tydd	John Parnell
1782	John Tydd	Hon. Richard FitzPatrick
October 1783	Sir John Parnell, 2nd Bt	Charles Henry Coote
1783	Sir Arthur Brooke, 1st Bt	Charles Henry Coote
1785	Frederick Trench	Charles Henry Coote
1790	Samuel Hayes	Charles Henry Coote
1796	Hon. John Vesey	Charles Henry Coote
1798	Eyre Coote	Henry Parnell
1800	Edward Dunne	Henry Parnell
1801	Constituency disenfranchised	
