= William Wellesley-Pole, 3rd Earl of Mornington =

Anglo-Irish politician (1763–1845)

The Right Honourable The Earl of Mornington GCH PC PC (Ire)
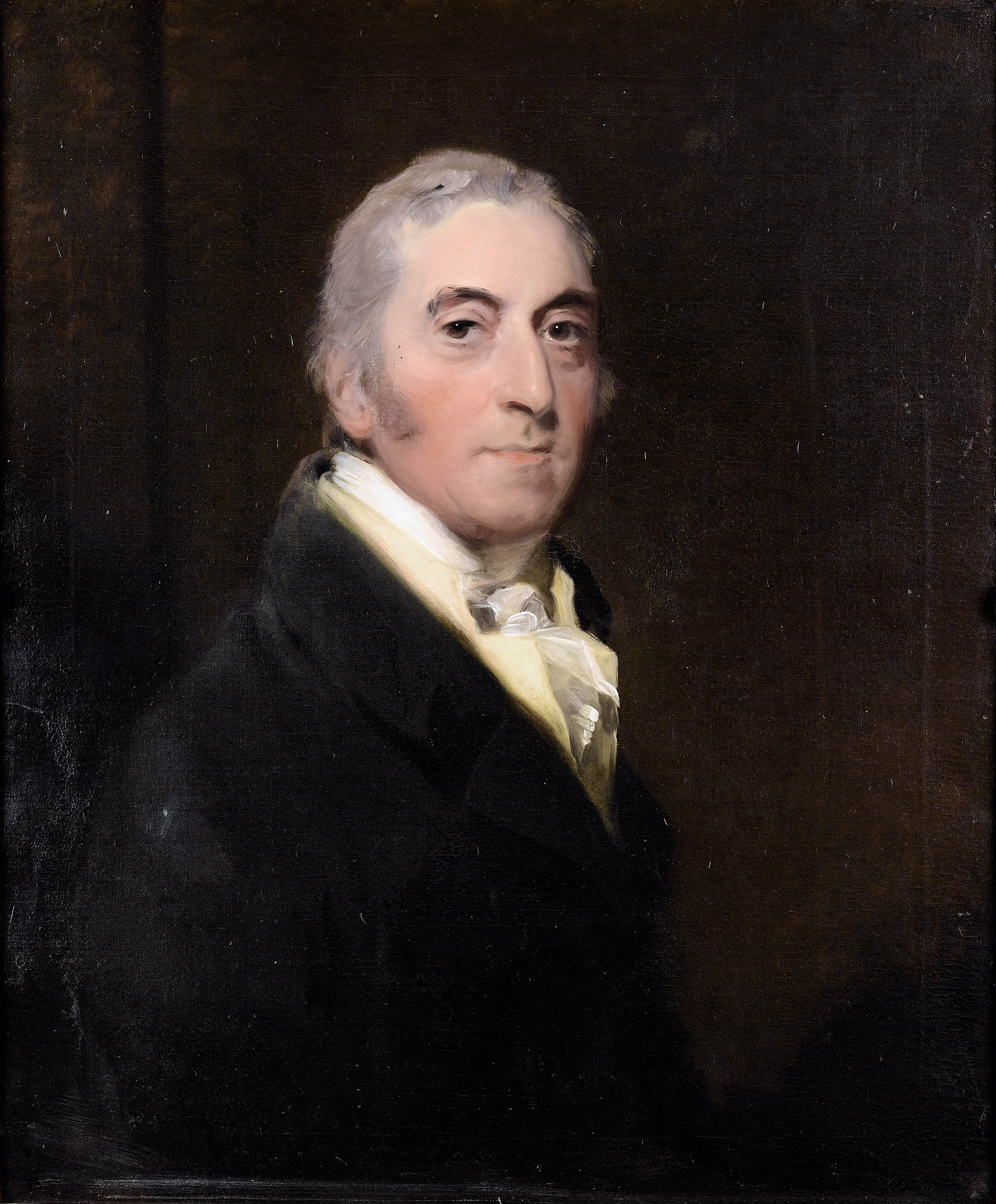
- William Wellesley-Pole, later 1st Baron Maryborough, and later 3rd Earl of Mornington (Thomas Lawrence)

Chief Secretary for Ireland
- In office 1809–1812
- Monarch: George III
- Prime Minister: Spencer Perceval
- Preceded by: Robert Dundas
- Succeeded by: Robert Peel

Postmaster General
- In office 1834–1835
- Monarch: William IV
- Prime Minister: Sir Robert Peel, Bt
- Preceded by: The Marquess Conyngham
- Succeeded by: The Marquess Conyngham

Personal details
- Born: William Wesley; 20 May 1763 Dangan Castle, County Meath
- Died: 22 February 1845 (aged 81) Grosvenor Square, Mayfair, London
- Resting place: Grosvenor Chapel
- Party: Tory
- Spouse: Katherine Elizabeth Forbes (m. 1784)
- Children: The 4th Earl of Mornington; Lady Mary Bagot; Emily, Lady Raglan; Priscilla, Countess of Westmorland

William Wellesley-Pole, 3rd Earl of Mornington, GCH, PC, PC (Ire) (20 May 1763 – 22 February 1845), known as Lord Maryborough between 1821 and 1842, was an Anglo-Irish politician and an elder brother of Field Marshal The 1st Duke of Wellington. His surname changed twice: he was born with the name Wesley, which he changed to Wesley-Pole following an inheritance in 1781. In 1789 the spelling was updated to Wellesley-Pole, just as other members of the family had changed Wesley to Wellesley.

== Origins ==
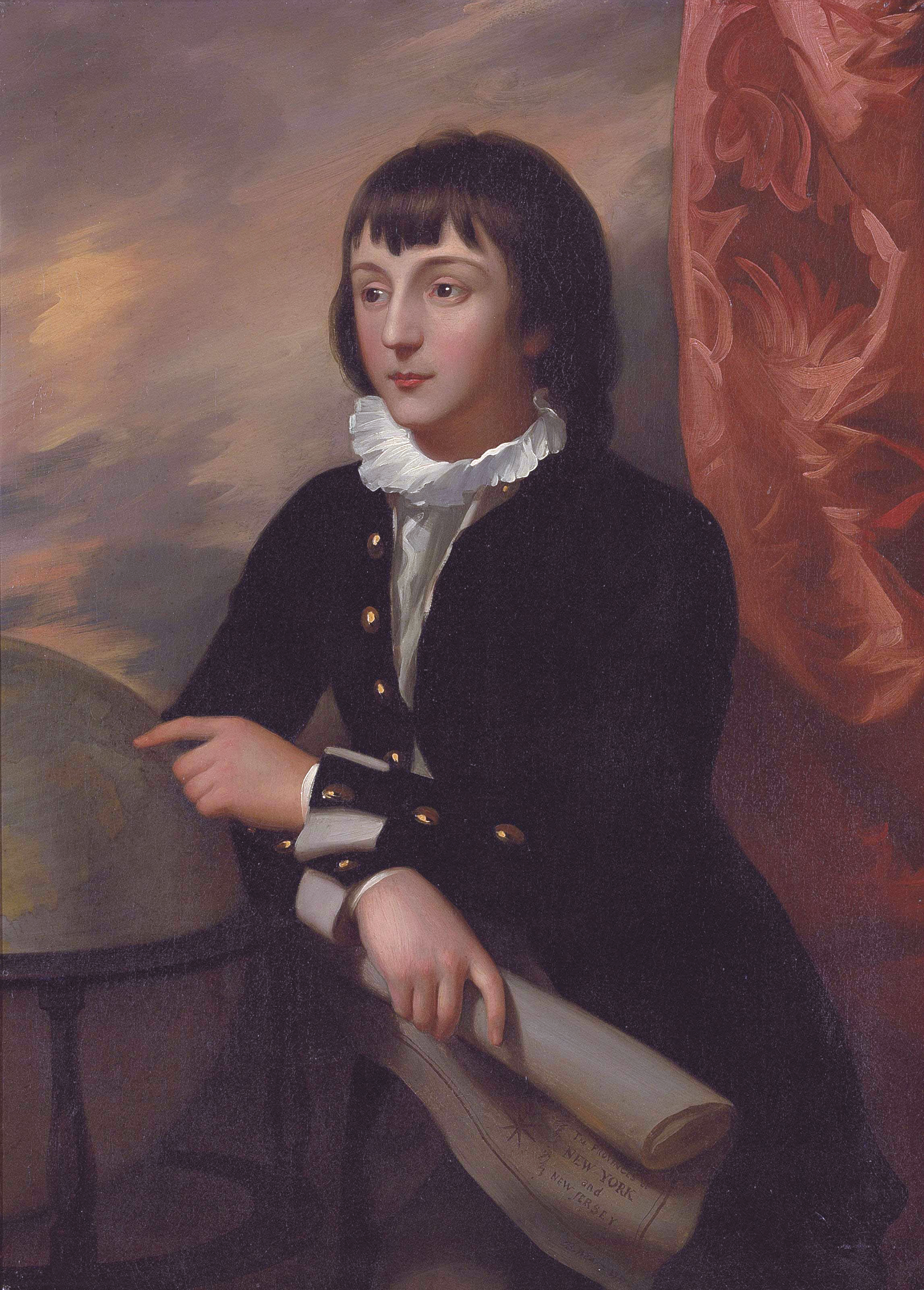
The young William Wesley aged 14, painted in 1777 by Benjamin West

He was born as William Wesley at Dangan Castle, near Trim in County Meath, the second son of Garret, 1st Earl of Mornington, by his marriage to Annie Hill, a daughter of the 1st Viscount Dungannon. He was the younger brother of Richard Wesley, later Marquess Wellesley, and the elder brother of Arthur, who became Duke of Wellington, and of Henry, who became Lord Cowley.

== Early life ==
Wesley was educated at Eton (1774–1776) before entering the Royal Navy as a midshipman, serving in the Navy between 1777 and 1783; most notably aboard HMS Lion, a new ship launched in 1777, at the Battle of Grenada of 1779.

== Pole inheritance ==
Due to the debts of their father, the Wesley family entered into financial stringency. This was partially alleviated following the death in 1781 of the childless William Pole, of Ballyfin in Ireland, his godfather and the husband of his great-aunt Ann Colley, who bequeathed his estates to Wesley, on the condition which was usual in such situations that he should adopt the surname "Pole".

Pole was descended from Peryam Pole, third son of the antiquary Sir William Pole (1561–1635) of Shute House, Devon, a brother of Sir John Pole, 1st Baronet. He had married Ann Colley, the sister of Wesley's grandfather Richard Wesley, 1st Baron Mornington (1690–1758). This Wesley had been born Richard Colley, but had changed his name in 1728, following an inheritance, to Wesley. Thus it was that in 1781, in accordance with the Will of his great-uncle William Pole, Wesley changed his name to Wesley-Pole.

== Political career ==
A Tory, Mornington was a Member of the Irish Parliament for Trim from 1783 to 1790, and of the British House of Commons for East Looe from 1790 to 1795, and Queen's County from 1801 to 1821. He served as Secretary of the Admiralty under the Duke of Portland between 1807 and 1809, and as Chief Secretary for Ireland under Spencer Perceval between 1809 and 1812, and was also a Lord of the Irish Treasury between 1809 and 1811 and Chancellor of the Irish Exchequer between 1811 and 1812.

Mornington was sworn of both the British Privy Council and the Irish Privy Council in 1809. He served in Lord Liverpool's government from 1814 to 1823 as Master of the Mint. In 1821, he was elevated to the Peerage of the United Kingdom as Baron Maryborough, of Maryborough in the Queen's County (now Portlaoise, County Laois).

In 1823, he was appointed Custos Rotulorum of Queen's County for life. From 1823 to 1830 he was Master of the Buckhounds and from 1834 to 1835 Postmaster General. From 1838 he held the honorary position of Captain of Deal Castle.

== Succession to earldom ==
On the death in 1842 of his elder brother Richard Wellesley, 1st Marquess Wellesley, he succeeded as 3rd Earl of Mornington.

== Marriage and progeny ==
On 24 June 1784, Lord Mornington married Katherine Elizabeth Forbes, daughter of Admiral John Forbes and granddaughter of George Forbes, 3rd Earl of Granard, and of William Capell, 3rd Earl of Essex. It was said that among the 1st Earl's sons, they had the only happy marriage. They had the following progeny, one son and three daughters:

- William Pole-Tylney-Long-Wellesley, 4th Earl of Mornington, (1788–1857), who married the wealthiest heiress in England, Catherine Tylney-Long, "The Wiltshire Heiress". William was a notable rake, and their marriage was fraught with difficulties.
- Lady Mary Charlotte Anne Wellesley (1786–1845), who married Sir Charles Bagot, on 22 July 1806. The couple had four sons and six daughters. The family accompanied their parents to Canada on the appointment of Sir Charles as Governor-General of British North America, on 12 January 1842. As the wife of a Governor-General in Canada, Lady Bagot assumed the title of "Her Excellency", in Montreal in August 1842. After her husband's death at Kingston, Ontario on 18 May 1843, she accompanied the remains to England. She died in London on 2 February 1845.
- Lady Emily Harriet Wellesley (1792–1881), who in 1814 married Lord FitzRoy Somerset, later 1st Baron Raglan.
- Lady Priscilla Anne Wellesley (1793–1879), who married John Fane, Lord Burghersh, later 11th Earl of Westmorland.
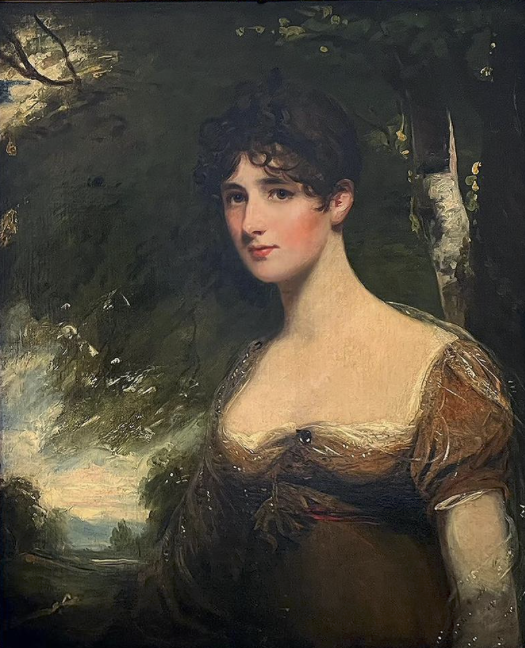
Lady Mary Charlotte Anne Wellesley-Pole, portrait by John Hoppner, 1807

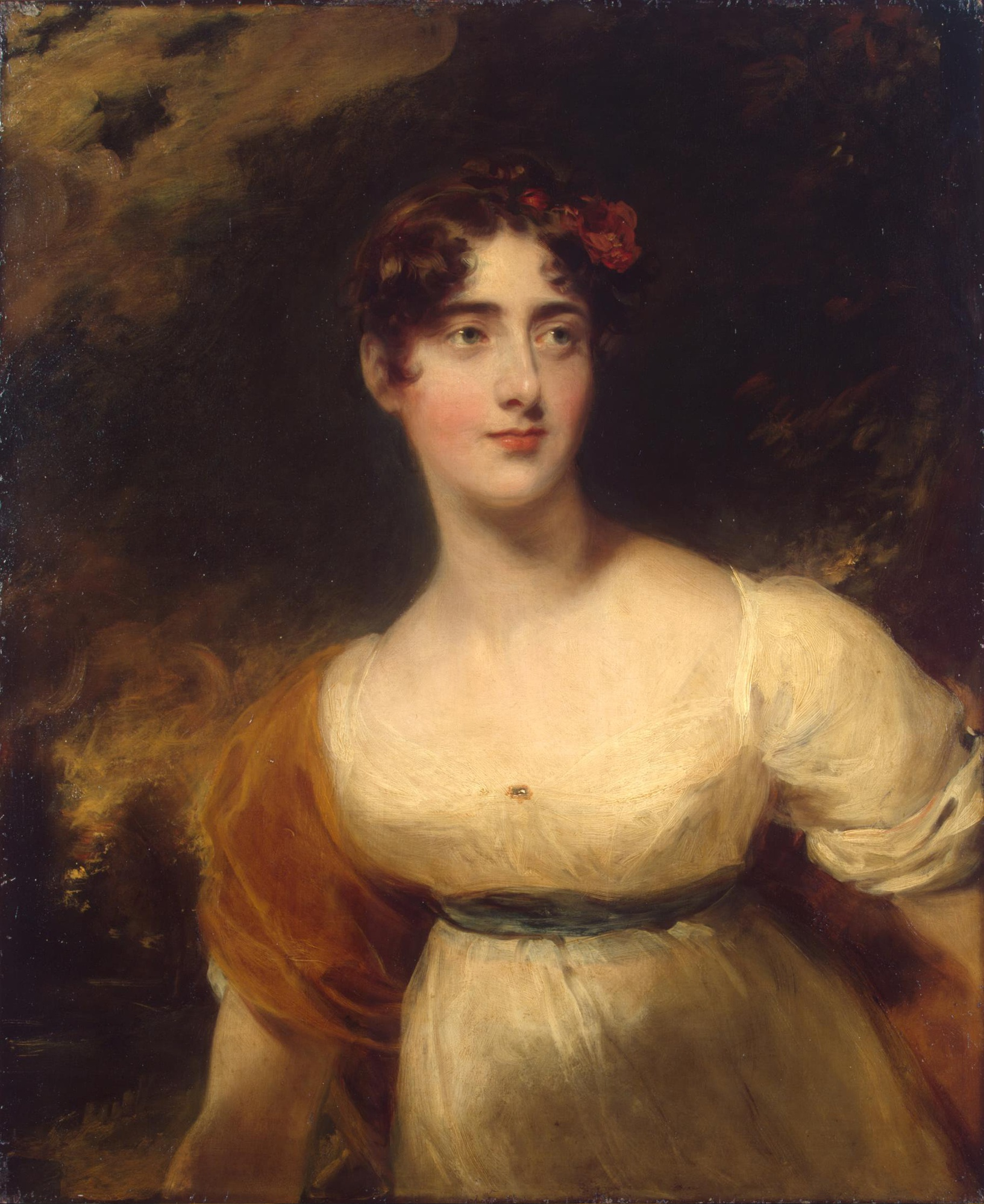
Lady Emily Harriet Wellesley-Pole, portrait by Sir Thomas Lawrence, c. 1814

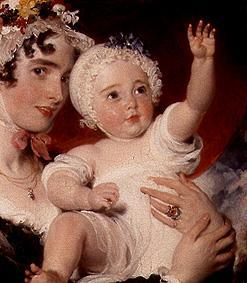
Lady Priscilla Anne Wellesley

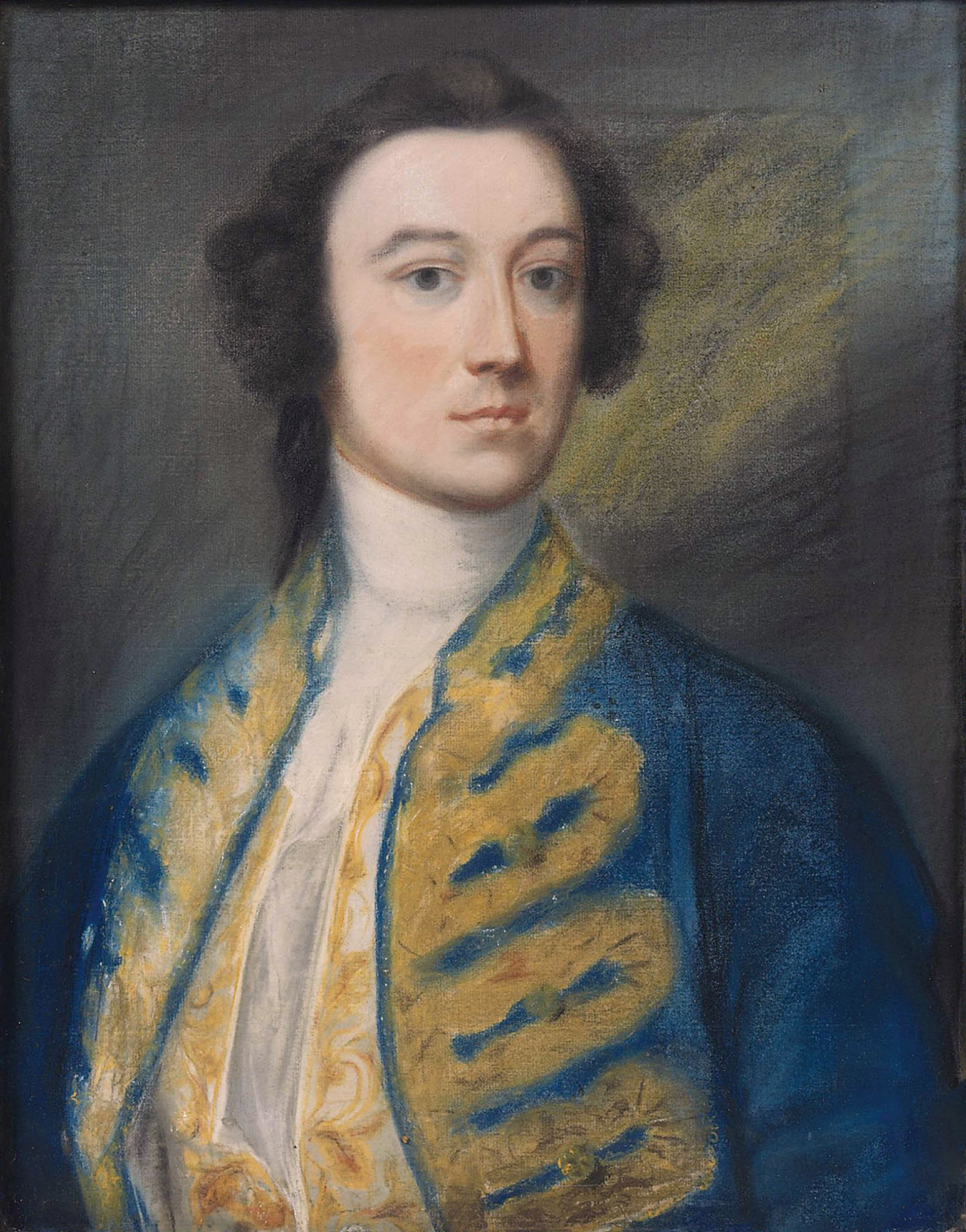
William Pole (died 1781), of Ballyfin, Ireland, who at his death bequeathed his estate to William Wesley

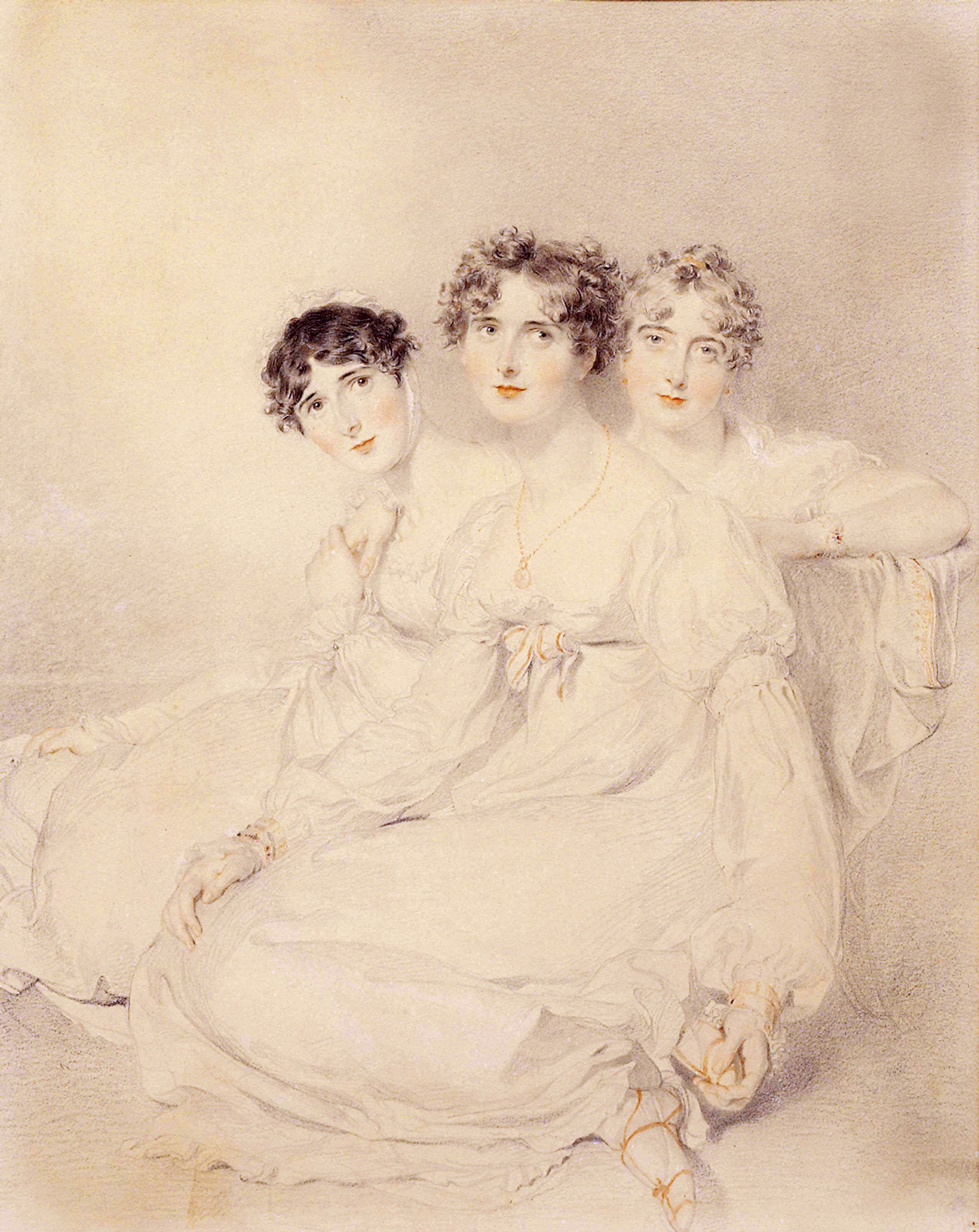
The Wellesley-Pole sisters, by Sir Thomas Lawrence. From left to right: Lady Mary Charlotte Anne, Lady Emily Harriet and Lady Priscilla Anne

== Death ==
He died on 22 February 1845.

== Notes ==
Parliament of Ireland
Preceded by William Arthur Crosbie; John Pomeroy	Member of Parliament for Trim; 1783–1790; With: John Pomeroy	Succeeded by Arthur Wesley; John Pomeroy
Parliament of Great Britain
Preceded by Viscount Belgrave; The Earl of Carysfort	Member of Parliament for East Looe; 1790 – 1795; With: Robert Wood	Succeeded by Robert Wood; Charles Arbuthnot
Parliament of the United Kingdom
Preceded by Sir John Parnell; Charles Henry Coote	Member of Parliament for Queen's County; 1801 – 1821; With: Charles Coote 1801–1802; Henry Parnell 1802; Eyre Coote 1802–1806; Sir Henry Parnell, Bt 1806–1821	Succeeded by Sir Henry Parnell, Bt; Sir Charles Henry Coote
Political offices
Preceded by John Sargent	Clerk of the Ordnance; 1802–1806	Succeeded by John Calcraft
Preceded by John Calcraft	Clerk of the Ordnance; 1807	Succeeded by Cropley Ashley-Cooper
Preceded by William Marsden	Secretary to the Admiralty; 1807–1809	Succeeded by John Wilson Croker
Preceded by Robert Dundas	Chief Secretary for Ireland; 1809–1812	Succeeded by Robert Peel
Preceded by John Foster	Chancellor of the Irish Exchequer; 1811–1812	Succeeded by William Vesey-FitzGerald
Preceded by The Earl of Clancarty	Master of the Mint; 1814–1823	Succeeded by George Tierney
Preceded by The Marquess Cornwallis	Master of the Buckhounds; 1823–1830	Succeeded by The Viscount Anson
Preceded by The Marquess Conyngham	Postmaster General; 1834–1835	Succeeded by The Marquess Conyngham
Peerage of Ireland
Preceded by Richard Wellesley	Earl of Mornington; 1842–1845	Succeeded by William Pole-Tylney-Long-Wellesley
Peerage of the United Kingdom
New creation	Baron Maryborough; 1821–1845	Succeeded by William Pole-Tylney-Long-Wellesley
