= Henry Parnell, 1st Baron Congleton =

Irish writer and politician (1776–1842)

The Right Honourable The Lord Congleton BT PC
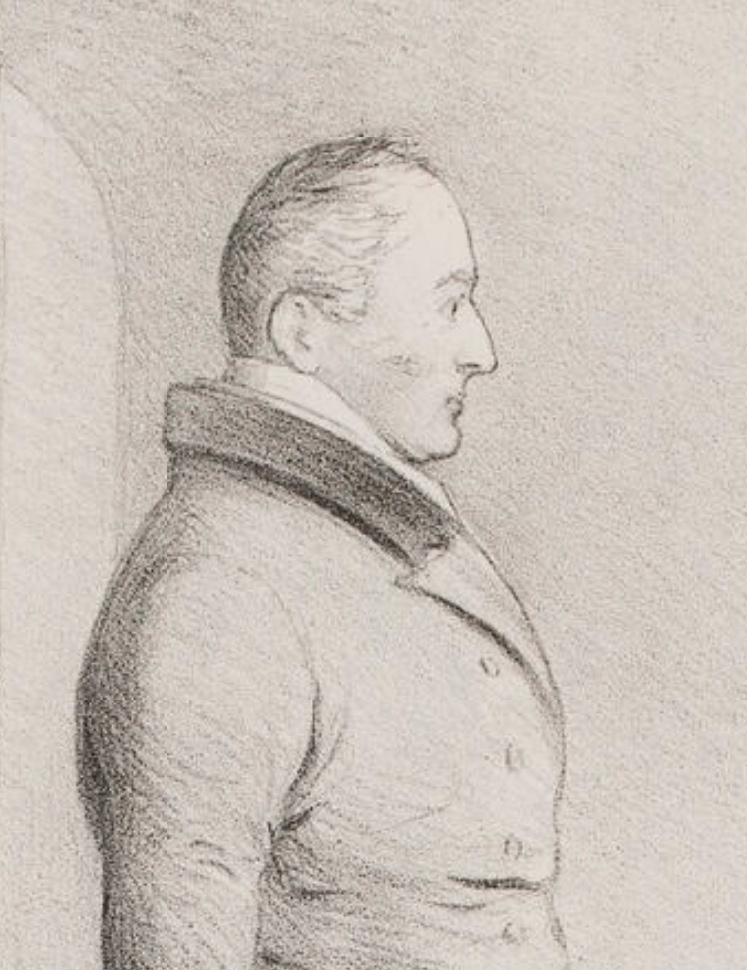
- 1832 Portrait of Baron Congleton by John Doyle

Paymaster General
- In office 27 April 1836 – 19 June 1841
- Monarchs: William IV; Victoria
- Prime Minister: The Viscount Melbourne
- Preceded by: Office established
- Succeeded by: Hon. Edward Stanley

Member of the House of Lords Lord Temporal
- In office 13 August 1841 – 8 June 1842; Hereditary peerage
- Preceded by: Peerage created
- Succeeded by: The 2nd Baron Congleton

Personal details
- Born: 3 July 1776
- Died: 8 June 1842 (aged 65)
- Party: Whig
- Spouse(s): Lady Caroline Damer (d. 1861)
- Children: At least 6, including John
- Education: Trinity College, Cambridge

Henry Brooke Parnell, 1st Baron Congleton, PC (3 July 1776 – 8 June 1842), known as Sir Henry Parnell, Bt, from 1812 to 1841, was an Irish writer and Whig politician. He was a member of the Whig administrations headed by Lord Grey and Lord Melbourne of the 1830s and also published works on financial and penal questions as well as on civil engineering. He was a grand-uncle to the Irish nationalist leader Charles Stewart Parnell.

== Background and education ==
Parnell was the second son of Sir John Parnell, 2nd Baronet, Chancellor of the Irish Exchequer, and Laetitia Charlotte, daughter of Sir Arthur Brooke, 1st Baronet. His younger brother William Parnell-Hayes was the grandfather of Charles Stewart Parnell. He was educated at Eton and Trinity College, Cambridge. In 1801 he inherited the family estates in Queen's County on the death of his father, bypassing his disabled elder brother according to a special Act of Parliament passed in 1789. In 1812 he succeeded as fourth Baronet, of Rathleague, on the death of his brother.

== Political career ==
Parnell represented Maryborough in the Irish House of Commons from 1798 until the Act of Union in 1801. In April the following year he was elected to Parliament of the United Kingdom for Queen's County, but relinquished this seat already in July of the same year, when he was returned for Portarlington. However, he resigned the seat already in December 1802. In 1806 he was once again elected for Queen's County, and represented the constituency until 1832. In 1828 he was chairman of the Select Committee on the State of Public Income and Expenditure which successfully recommended abolition of the 280-year-old Navy Board and the merging of its functions into the Board of Admiralty.

It was by Parnell's motion on the civil list that the Duke of Wellington's administration was defeated in 1830. The Whigs came to power under Lord Grey and in 1831 Parnell was admitted to the Privy Council and appointed Secretary at War, a post he held until February 1833. He resigned his seat in Parliament the same year but returned in 1833 as the representative for Dundee. When the Whigs again came to power in April 1835 under Lord Melbourne, Parnell was made Paymaster of the Forces and Treasurer of the Ordnance and Navy. These offices were consolidated into that of Paymaster General in 1836, and Parnell retained this post until the government fell in 1841. The latter year he was raised to the peerage as Baron Congleton, of Congleton in the County Palatine of Chester.

== Works ==
- Observations upon the State of Currency of Ireland, and upon the Course of Exchange between London and Dublin (1804; 2nd edn., 1804; 3rd edn. (with additional appendix), 1804).
- The Principles of Currency and Exchange, illustrated by Observations on the State of Ireland (1805).
- An Historical Apology for the Irish Catholics (1807).
- A History of the Penal Laws against the Irish Catholics, from the Treaty of Limerick to the Union (1808; a 'new edition' appeared in vols. xx. and xxi. of the Pamphleteer (1822); 4th edn. (with slightly altered title), 1825).
- Treatise on the Corn Trade and Agriculture (1809).
- The Substance of the Speeches of Sir Henry Parnell, bart., in the House of Commons, with additional Observations on the Corn Laws (1814; 3rd edn. published in vol. iv. of the Pamphleteer (1814).
- Observations on the Irish Butter Acts (1825).
- Observations on Paper Money, Banking, and Over-Trading, including those parts of the Evidence taken before the Committee of the House of Commons which explain the Scotch System of Banking (1827, 1829).
- On Financial Reform (1830; 2nd edn., 1830; 3rd edn., 1831; 4th edn., 1832). Selections from this book, compiled by Henry Lloyd Morgan, were published under the title of National Accounts (2nd edn., 1873).
- A plain Statement of the Power of the Bank of England, and the Use it has made of it; with a Refutation of the Objections made to the Scotch System of Banking, and a Reply to "The Historical Sketch [by J. R. McCulloch] of the Bank of England," (1832).
- A Treatise on Roads, wherein the Principles on which Roads should be made are explained and illustrated by the Plans, Specifications, and Contracts made use of by Thomas Telford, Esq., on the Holyhead Road (1833; 2nd edn., 1838).
- The Psalms: a new Version (1860; 2nd edn., 1875).

Parnell was the author of books and pamphlets on matters connected with financial questions, the major important work being On Financial Reform, published in 1830. Parnell was opposed to the prevailing protectionist system and advocated retrenchment of public expenditure, especially for the armed services. On Financial Reform proposed the repeal of taxes on raw materials and home manufactures, along with the reduction of import duties on foreign manufactures. He also favoured the reduction of taxes on "luxuries", such as tea, sugar, tobacco, wine and spirits. To pay for these reforms, Parnell proposed the reintroduction of the income tax. According to Sidney Buxton, On Financial Reform exercised a considerable influence on public opinion and "laid before the country the financial and fiscal policy that Peel and Gladstone afterwards carried through".

One of the main representatives of the so-called "British free banking school", Parnell argued that the best way to achieve monetary stability was to revoke the Bank of England's monopoly on the issue of banknotes. These ideas were defended by Parnell and others in opposition to those of the British Currency School who advocated legal restrictions on the amount of notes that could be issued, with respect to their deposits in specie, and the British Banking School, which advocated discretionary policy by the banks in monetary matters. Support for free banking declined after Parnell's death in 1842, and the Bank Charter Act 1844 eliminated the right of new banks in England and Wales to issue notes, consolidating the Bank of England's monopoly.

Parnell also wrote about penal matters. In the domain of civil engineering, he authored the 1833 and 1838 editions of A Treatise on Roads, in which the works and techniques of Thomas Telford were described.

== Family ==
Parnell married Lady Caroline Elizabeth, daughter of John Dawson, 1st Earl of Portarlington, in 1801. In 1842, having suffered for some time from ill health and melancholy, he committed suicide by hanging, aged 65. He was succeeded in his titles by his eldest son John Vesey Parnell. Lady Congleton died in February 1861.

The couple had three sons and three daughters who reached adulthood. A daughter, Frances Louisa, died when she was five years old, and was buried in Westminster Abbey. Her monument bears the inscription "Sacred to the memory of Frances Louisa Parnell. Born 28 October 1806 Died 18 September 1812. Interred under this spot. This monument is placed here by her afflicted and disconsolate mother."

His great grandson Henry Parnell, 5th Baron Congleton was the youngest Member of Parliament killed in World War I.

Parliament of Ireland
Preceded by Hon. John Vesey; Charles Henry Coote	Member of Parliament for Maryborough; 1798–1801; With: Eyre Coote 1798–1800; Edward Dunne 1800–1801	Succeeded by Parliament of the United Kingdom
Parliament of the United Kingdom
Preceded by Charles Coote; Hon. William Wellesley-Pole	Member of Parliament for Queen's County; 1802; With: Hon. William Wellesley-Pole	Succeeded by Hon. William Wellesley-Pole; Sir Eyre Coote
Preceded by William Elliot	Member of Parliament for Portarlington; 1802	Succeeded by Thomas Tyrwhitt
Preceded by Sir Eyre Coote; William Wellesley-Pole	Member of Parliament for Queen's County; 1806–1832; With: William Wellesley-Pole to 1821; Sir Charles Coote, Bt from 1821	Succeeded by Sir Charles Coote, Bt; Patrick Lalor
Preceded by George Kinloch	Member of Parliament for Dundee; 1833–1841	Succeeded by George Duncan
Political offices
Preceded by Charles Williams-Wynn	Secretary at War; 1831–1832	Succeeded by Sir John Hobhouse, Bt
Preceded by Sir Edward Knatchbull, Bt	Paymaster of the Forces; 1835–1836	Succeeded by Consolidated to Paymaster General
Preceded by Viscount Lowther	Treasurer of the Navy; 1835–1836	Succeeded by Consolidated to Paymaster General
Preceded by Alexander Perceval	Treasurer of the Ordnance; 1835–1836	Succeeded by Consolidated to Paymaster General
New office	Paymaster General; 1836–1841	Succeeded by Hon. Edward Stanley
Peerage of the United Kingdom
New creation	Baron Congleton; 1841–1842	Succeeded by John Vesey Parnell
Baronetage of Ireland
Preceded by John Augustus Parnell	Baronet (of Rathleague); 1812–1842	Succeeded by John Vesey Parnell
