= Charles Coote, 2nd Baron Castle Coote =

Irish politician

Charles Henry Coote, 2nd Baron Castle Coote PC (25 August 1754 – 22 January 1823), known as Charles Coote until 1802, was an Irish politician.

== Background and education ==
A member of the Coote family headed by the Earl of Mountrath, Coote was the son of the Very Reverend Charles Coote, Dean of Kilfenora, by Grace Tilson, daughter of Thomas Tilson. Sir Eyre Coote was his younger brother. He was educated at Eton and Trinity College Dublin.

== Political career ==
Coote was returned to the Irish House of Commons for Queen's County in 1776, a seat he held until 1783, and then represented Maryborough until 1798. He once again sat for Queen's County from 1798 to 1800, when the Irish Parliament was abolished.

He served as Commissioner of Barracks of Ireland between 1788 and 1789, as Commissioner of Accounts of Ireland between 1789 and 1795, as Commissioner of Customs of Ireland between 1795 and 1799 and as Commissioner of Excise of Ireland between 1799 and 1806 and was sworn of the Irish Privy Council in 1800. He was appointed High Sheriff of Queen's County for 1791–92, and Colonel of the Queen's County Militia on 22 January 1799. In 1801 he was returned to the British Parliament for Queen's County.

In 1800 Coote's kinsman Charles Coote, 7th Earl of Mountrath, had been created Baron Castle Coote, in the Queen's County, in the Peerage of Ireland, with a special remainder to his kinsman, Charles Coote. Lord Mountrath died in 1802 and Charles Coote succeeded as 2nd Baron Castle Coote according to the special remainder (the earldom became extinct; see Coote baronets). Coote was consequently forced to resign his seat in Parliament as Irish peers were not allowed to represent Irish constituencies in Parliament. Lord Castle Coote served as a Commissioner of Customs of Ireland between 1802 and 1803 and as First Commissioner between 1806 and 1823.

== Family ==
Lord Castle Coote married Elizabeth Anne Tilson, daughter of Reverend Henry Tilson, in 1779. They had several children. Lady Castle Coote died in January 1821. Lord Castle Coote died in January 1823, aged 68, and was succeeded in the barony by his only surviving son, Eyre.

Parliament of Ireland
Preceded by William Pole; John Dawson	Member of Parliament for Queen's County; 1776–1783; With: John Dawson 1776–1779; John Warburton 1779–1783	Succeeded by John Warburton; Sir John Parnell, Bt
Preceded by John Tydd; Hon. Richard FitzPatrick	Member of Parliament for Maryborough; 1783–1798; With: Sir John Parnell, Bt 1783; Sir Arthur Brooke, Bt 1783–1785; Frederick Trench 1785–1790; Samuel Hayes 1790–1796; Hon. John Vesey 1796–1798	Succeeded by Eyre Coote; Henry Parnell
Preceded by Sir John Parnell, Bt; John Warburton	Member of Parliament for Queen's County; 1798–1800; With: Sir John Parnell, Bt	Constituency abolished
Parliament of the United Kingdom
New constituency	Member of Parliament for Queen's County; 1801–1802; With: Sir John Parnell, Bt 1801; Hon. William Wellesley-Pole 1801–1802	Succeeded by Hon. William Wellesley-Pole; Henry Parnell
Peerage of Ireland
Preceded by Charles Henry Coote	Baron Castle Coote; 1802–1823	Succeeded by Eyre Tilson Coote
