= Ephraim Dawson =

Anglo-Irish politician (died 1746)

Ephraim Dawson (died 27 August 1746) was an Anglo-Irish politician.

Dawson was the son of William Dawson and Elizabeth Jardine. He was a successful banker, and used his wealth to purchase an estate at Portarlington, County Laois. In 1713, he was elected as a Member of Parliament for Portarlington in the Irish House of Commons. He represented the seat until 1715, when he was elected to represent Queen's County; he sat for the constituency until his death in 1746.

Dawson married Anne Preston, daughter and heiress of Samuel Preston. He was succeeded by his son, William Dawson, who was created Viscount Carlow in 1776.

Parliament of Ireland
Preceded by Thomas Carter; Richard Warburton	Member of Parliament for Portarlington; 1713–1714; With: Richard Warburton	Succeeded by Richard Warburton; Richard Warburton
Preceded by Dudley Cosby; Richard FitzPatrick	Member of Parliament for Queen's County; 1715–1746; With: Dudley Cosby (1715–1729); Richard Warburton (1729–1746)	Succeeded by Richard Warburton; George Evans
