= Student teams-achievement divisions =

Student teams-achievement divisions (STAD) is a Cooperative learning strategy in which small groups of learners with different levels of ability work together to accomplish a shared learning goal. It was devised by Robert Slavin and his associates at Johns Hopkins University.

STAD is considered as one of the most researched, simplest, and most straightforward of all cooperative learning. It was established based on the fulfillment of instructional pedagogy. It is used in meeting well-defined instructional objectives. It is a learning strategy in which there are small group of learners with different levels of abilities, wherein they all come together to accomplish a shared learning goal.

== Working of STAD ==
The students are placed in small groups or teams. The class in its entirety is presented with a lesson and students are subsequently tested. Individuals are graded on the team's performance. Although the tests are taken individually, students are encouraged to work together to improve the overall performance of the group. It is basically a team work, but students are graded individually according to their contribution that they make towards their team. Usually in STAD students are assigned four to five members in a group that are mixed in performance level, gender, and ethnicity.

The teacher teaches a lesson to the students and they then work in teams and ensure that they have mastered the lesson. The students take individual quizzes on the material, at which they may not help each other. Their scores are compared to their own past averages and points are awarded on the basis of the degree to which students meet or exceed their own earlier performance. It encourages the students to take up responsibility for other members in their group as well as themselves. Thus in this way it is guaranteed that all group members with different levels are equally motivated to do their best.

Slavin (1995) enumerated three main concepts of STAD as team rewards, individual accountability and for equal opportunities for success . Team rewards are certificates or either rewards which are given if a STAD group achieves higher than predetermined level . In this way a spirit of positive competition is reinforced and all or none of the groups would be rewarded based on how they score. In terms of individual accountability, the individual learning of each of the group members determines the success of the terms.

STAD has been used in a wide variety of subjects from mathematics to language, arts to social science and used from 2nd grade in schools through college. It is the most appropriate for teaching well defined objectives by incorporating more open-ended assessments, such as essays or performance.

In STAD, students are assigned to four orfive5-member heterogeneous groups. Once these assignments are made, a four-step cycle is initiated: (i) teach, (ii) team study, (iii) test and (iv) recognition.

=== Teach ===
In the teaching stage, the teacher presents materials usually in a lecture-discussion format. Students should be told what it is they are going to learn and why it is important.

=== Team study ===
In the team study stage, group members work cooperatively with teacher-provided worksheets and answer sheets.

=== Test ===
In the testing stage, each student individually takes a quiz. The teacher grades the quiz and notes the current scores as well as the improvement over previous quizzes.

=== Recognition ===
Each team receives recognition awards depending on the average scores of each team. For example, teams that average 15 to 19 improvement points receive a GOOD TEAM certificate, teams that average 20 to 24 improvement points receive a GREAT TEAM certificate, and teams that average 25 to 30 improvement points receive a SUPER TEAM certificate.

== Components of STAD ==
- Class presentation
- Teams
- Quizzes
- Individual improvement score
- Team recognition

=== Advantages ===
- Group has greater information resources than individuals do
- Group has to employ a greater number of creative problem-solving methods
- Group members gain a better understanding of themselves as they interact with each other.
- Working in a group foster learning and comprehension of idea discussed.

=== Disadvantages ===
- An individual group member may dominate the discussion.
- Some group members may rely too much on others to get the job done.
- Group members may pressure others to conform to the majority opinion.
