= Frederick Trench (MP for Maryborough) =

Irish Member of Parliament, barrister and amateur architect

Michael Frederick Trench (May 1746 – April 1836) was an Irish Member of Parliament, he was a barrister, and an amateur architect.

== Biography ==
The son of the Rev. Frederick Trench and his wife Mary Moore, he was educated at Kilkenny College and Trinity College, Dublin (BA 1766) and took the Grand Tour in 1770–1772. He was called to the Irish Bar in 1774. In July 1782 he was made a Justice of the Peace for county Roscommon. In 1785 he was returned to the Irish House of Commons for Maryborough in the by-election that followed the death of Sir Arthur Brooke, and sat until 1790.

In 1789 he was appointed a commissioner and overseer of barracks and in 1803 he became chairman of the Barrack Board; he was also a governor of several hospitals. He was a member of the Wide Streets Commission and leased ten lots on North Frederick Street in Dublin in 1793. It is likely that the street is named for and by Frederick although it may have been officially ascribed to Frederick, Prince of Wales.

He also designed and built in 1777, his home at Heywood House, Ballinakill.

In 1774 he married Anne Helena Stewart; their elder son was General Sir Frederick William Trench and their youngest daughter Sarah Helena was the second wife of Sir Compton Domvile, 1st Baronet.

Parliament of Ireland
Preceded by Sir Arthur Brooke; Charles Henry Coote	Member of Parliament for Maryborough; 1785–1790; With: Charles Henry Coote	Succeeded by Samuel Hayes; Charles Henry Coote
