= Queen's County (Parliament of Ireland constituency) =

Pre-1801 Irish constituency

- Former county constituency for the Irish House of Commons
- County: Queen's County

–1801
- Seats: 2
- Replaced by: Queen's County

Queen's County was a constituency represented in the Irish House of Commons until 1800. The county was known as County Laois from 1922.

== Members of Parliament ==
- 1585 Warham St Leger and Robert Harpole
- 1613–1615 Sir Robert Pigott and Sir Henry Power
- 1634–1635 John Pigott and Sir Piers Crosby
- 1639–1649 John Pigott (died and replaced in 1646 by Francis Barrington) and Sir Charles Coote, 1st Baronet (Coote died and replaced 1642 by George Graham. Graham died and replaced 1642 by Terence McGrath. Mcgrath died and replaced 1646 by Gilbert Rawson)
- 1661–1666 Thomas Pigott and Childley Coote (Coote died and replaced 1661 by Daniel Hutchinson)

=== 1689–1801 ===
Election	First MP	Second MP
1689	Sir Patrick Trant	Edmond Morres
1692	John Weaver	John Weaver
1695	Robert Warneford	John Weaver
1703	Dudley Cosby	John Weaver
1713	Dudley Cosby	Richard FitzPatrick
1715	Dudley Cosby	Ephraim Dawson
1729	Richard Warburton	Ephraim Dawson
1747	Richard Warburton	George Evans
1761	William Dawson	William Pole
1768	John Dawson	William Pole
1776	John Dawson	Charles Coote
1779	John Warburton	Charles Coote
1783	John Warburton	Sir John Parnell, 2nd Bt
1790	Viscount Moore	Sir John Parnell, 2nd Bt
1791	John Warburton	Sir John Parnell, 2nd Bt
1798	Charles Coote	Sir John Parnell, 2nd Bt
1801	Superseded by Westminster constituency of Queen's County	
