= Sir John Parnell, 2nd Baronet =

Irish politician

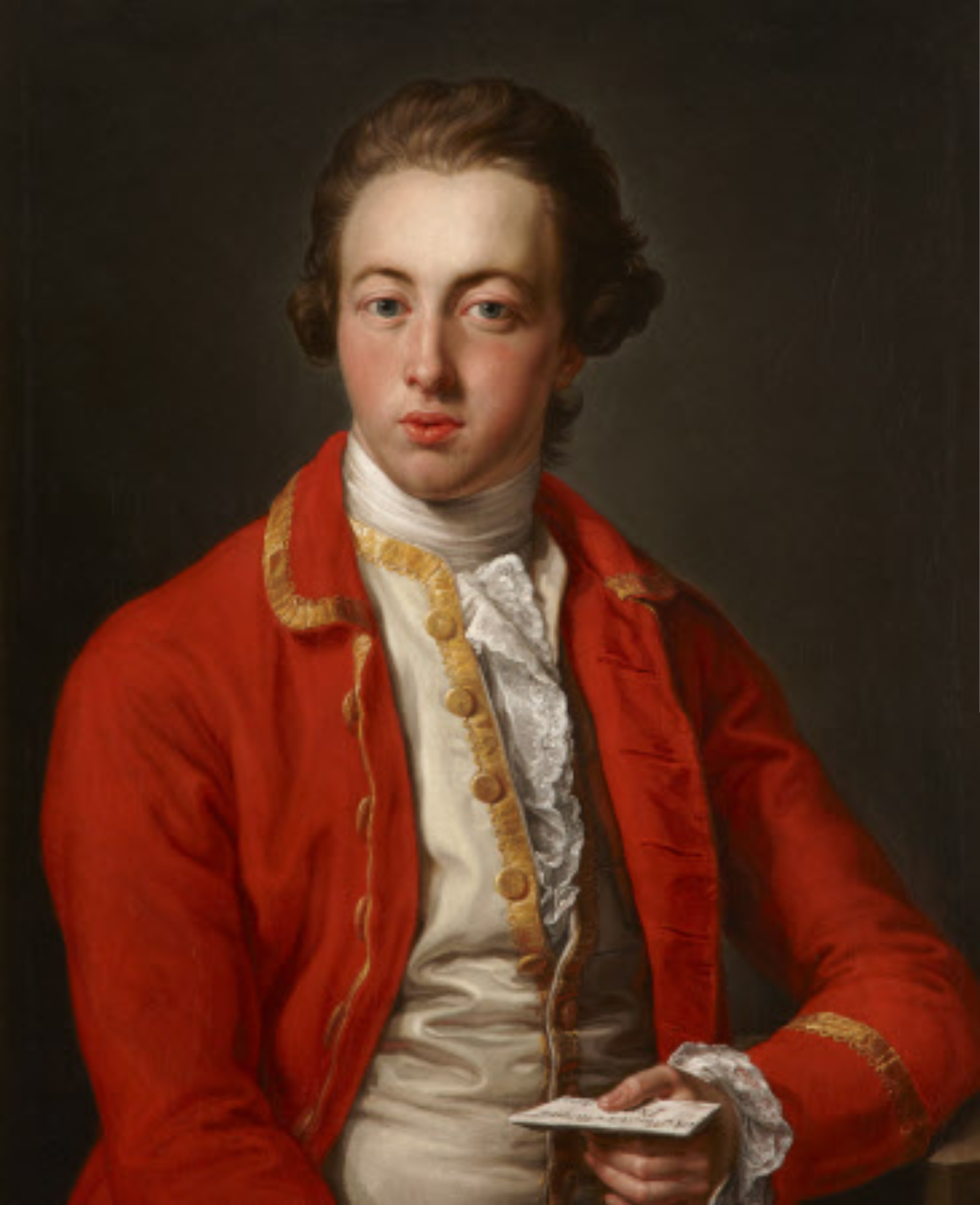
Painting of Sir John Parnell, around 1770, by Pompeo Batoni.

Sir John Parnell, 2nd Baronet (25 December 1744 – December 1801) was an Anglo-Irish Member of Parliament.

== Biography ==
A Church of Ireland landowner, his family had originally migrated to Ireland from Congleton in Cheshire. The only son of Sir John Parnell, 1st Baronet and Anne Ward, daughter of Michael Ward, justice of the Court of King's Bench. Parnell was a supporter of Catholic emancipation and was the great-grandfather of Charles Stewart Parnell, leader of the Irish Home Rule campaign.

From a line of politically astute ancestors who had moved to Ireland in the 17th century, Parnell rose to the highest positions in Irish politics as Commissioner of the Revenue (1780), Chancellor of the Exchequer of Ireland (1787), and Lord of the Treasury (1793).

Parnell first served in the Parliament of Ireland as an MP for Bangor, from 1767 to 1768. He later sat for Queen's County from 1783 until the Union with Great Britain created the United Kingdom of Great Britain and Ireland in 1801. Parnell and his son Henry opposed the Act of Union 1800 between the kingdoms of Great Britain and Ireland. Before this, Parnell was a Commander of Irish Volunteers and had been instrumental in winning the right for Catholics to vote. Efforts to secure full emancipation, including the right of Catholics to sit in Parliament, faltered when the parliament of Ireland was dissolved in 1800.

Henry Grattan described Parnell as "an honest, straightforward, independent man, possessed of considerable ability and much public spirit; as Chancellor of the Exchequer he was not deficient, and he served his country by his plan to reduce the interest of money. He was amiable in private, mild in disposition, but firm in mind and purpose. His conduct at the Union did him honour, and proved how warmly he was attached to the interests of his country, and on this account he was dismissed".

After the Union in January 1801, he continued as an MP for Queen's County in the House of Commons of the United Kingdom, but died suddenly in London in December 1801.

== Family ==
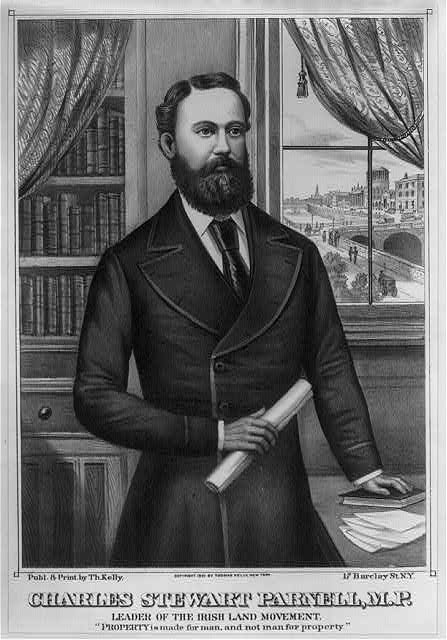
Sir John's great-grandson, the legendary land-reformer Charles Stewart Parnell

Parnell married Laetitia Charlotte Brooke, younger daughter of Sir Arthur Brooke, 1st Baronet and his first wife Margaret Fortescue in 1774, and together they had four children. Their eldest son John Augustus was a deaf-mute who was housed in a large walled garden for most of his life, while their second son Henry Brooke Parnell would go on to inherit the baronetcy and follow his own political career, becoming an Irish peer and also a member of parliament for Queen's County in the House of Commons at Westminster.

Sir John Parnell, 2nd Baronet, left another son William, who in turn had a son, John Henry Parnell. The fourth son of John Henry Parnell was Charles Stewart Parnell, known as "the uncrowned king of Ireland".

Parliament of Ireland
Preceded by Charles Coote; John Warburton	Member of Parliament for Queen's County; 1783 – 1800; With: John Warburton to 1790; Charles, Viscount Moore 1790–91; John Warburton 1791–98; Charles Coote from 1798	Succeeded by Parliament of the United Kingdom
Parliament of the United Kingdom
Preceded by Parliament of Ireland	Member of Parliament for Queen's County; 1801; With: Charles Coote	Succeeded by Charles Coote; Hon. William Wellesley-Pole
Baronetage of Ireland
Preceded by John Parnell	Baronet (of Rathleague); 1782–1801	Succeeded by John Augustus Parnell
