= Emma Portman, Viscountess Portman =

British aristocrat (1861-1929)

Emma Andalusia Frere Portman Viscountess Portman
- Born: 20 October 1861
- Died: 13 May 1929 (aged 67)
- Spouse(s): George Dawson-Damer, 5th Earl of Portarlington (m. 1881; died 1900) Henry Portman, 3rd Viscount Portman (m. 1901; died 1923)
- Parents: Lord Nigel Kennedy (father); Catherine Anne May (mother)
- Relatives: Archibald Kennedy (paternal grandfather); Lionel Dawson-Damer (son)

Emma Andalusia Frere Portman, Viscountess Portman (née Kennedy, formerly Dawson-Damer, Countess of Portarlington; (20 October 1861 – 13 May 1929), styled Viscountess Carlow from 1881 until 1892, was an English aristocrat known for her marriages to two different peers.

== Early life ==
Emma was born on 20 October 1861. She was the only daughter of Catherine Anne May and Lord Nigel Kennedy. She had two brothers, Fergus de Carrick Frere Kennedy and James Archibald Frere Kennedy, both of whom died unmarried.

Her paternal grandparents were Archibald Kennedy, Earl of Cassillis, heir apparent to Marquess of Ailsa until his death, and the former Eleanor Allardyce (daughter of Alexander Allardyce). Among her family was uncle Archibald Kennedy, 2nd Marquess of Ailsa. Her maternal grandfather was Maj. James Frere May.

== Personal life ==
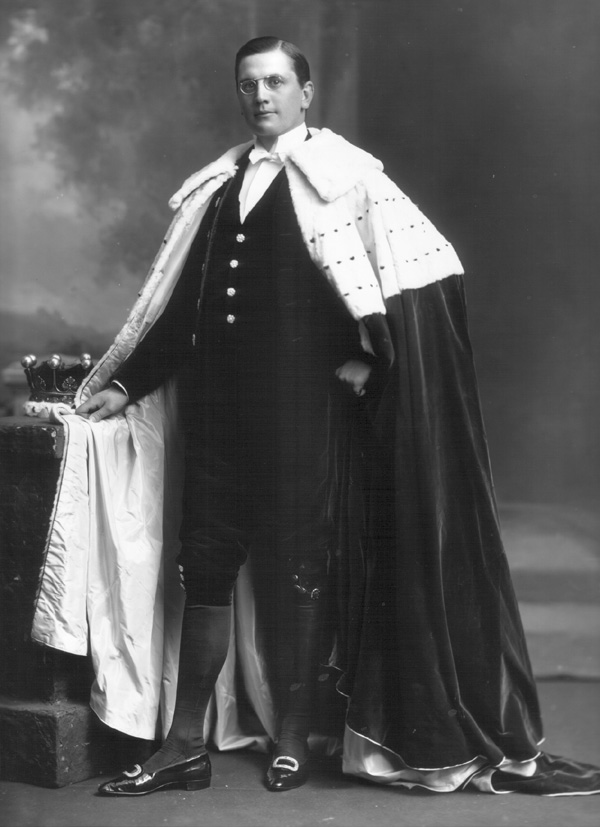
Photograph of her eldest son, Lionel, at the Coronation of King George V, 1911.

On 25 October 1881, Emma married George Dawson-Damer, Viscount Carlow, the eldest son of Lionel Dawson-Damer, 4th Earl of Portarlington and Hon. Harriet Lydia Montagu (daughter of the 6th Baron Rokeby, Major-General commanding the Brigade of Guards). After his father's death on 17 December 1892, he became the 5th Earl of Portarlington and Emma became the Countess of Portarlington. Together, they were the parents of:

- Lionel George Henry Seymour Dawson-Damer, 6th Earl of Portarlington (1883–1959), who married Winnifreda Yuill, only daughter of George Skelton Yuill, in 1907.
- Lady Aline Mary Seymour Dawson-Damer (1884–1953), who married Lt.-Col. Valentine Vivian, son of William Vivian, in 1904.
- Lady Christian Norah Dawson-Damer (1890–1959), who married Capt. Hon. Fergus Bowes-Lyon, son of Claude Bowes-Lyon, 14th Earl of Strathmore and Kinghorne and Cecilia Cavendish-Bentinck, in 1914. Fergus's sister was Queen Elizabeth The Queen Mother. After he was killed in 1915 during World War I, she married Capt. William Frederick Martin, a son of Charles William Wall Martin, in 1919.
- Hon. George Seymour Dawson-Damer (1892–1917), a Lieutenant in the 10th Hussars and Dorset Yeomanry who died from wounds received in action in World War I.
- Lady Moyra Marjorie Dawson-Damer (1897–1962), who married James Brinsley Peter FitzGerald, son of Peter David FitzGerald (son of Sir Peter FitzGerald, 19th Knight of Kerry), in 1924.

Lord Portarlington died of "congestion of the kidneys" at the Royal Palace Hotel at Ostend, on 31 August 1900 at age 42.

After his death, Emma widow married Army officer Henry Portman, 3rd Viscount Portman (1860–1923), son of William Portman, 2nd Viscount Portman and Hon. Mary FitzWilliam (daughter of William Charles Wentworth-FitzWilliam, Viscount Milton), on 25 September 1901. From her marriage to Lord Portman, she was the mother of:

- Hon. Selina Luisa Portman (1903–1945)

Lord Portman died on 18 January 1923. Lady Portman died on 13 May 1929.

=== Descendants ===
Through her daughter Lady Aline, she was a grandmother of Celia Marjorie Vivian, who married Sir John Molesworth-St Aubyn, 14th Baronet, eldest son of Sir Hugh Molesworth-St Aubyn, 13th Baronet.

Through her daughter Lady Christian, she was a grandmother of Rosemary Lusia Bowes-Lyon (1915–1989), a first cousin of Queen Elizabeth II who married Edward Wilfred George Joicey-Cecil, youngest son of Col. Lord John Joicey-Cecil, MP for Stamford (a son of the 3rd Marquess of Exeter), in 1945.
