= George Dawson-Damer, 5th Earl of Portarlington =

British peer and landowner (1858-1900)

The Right Honourable The Earl of Portarlington JP DL
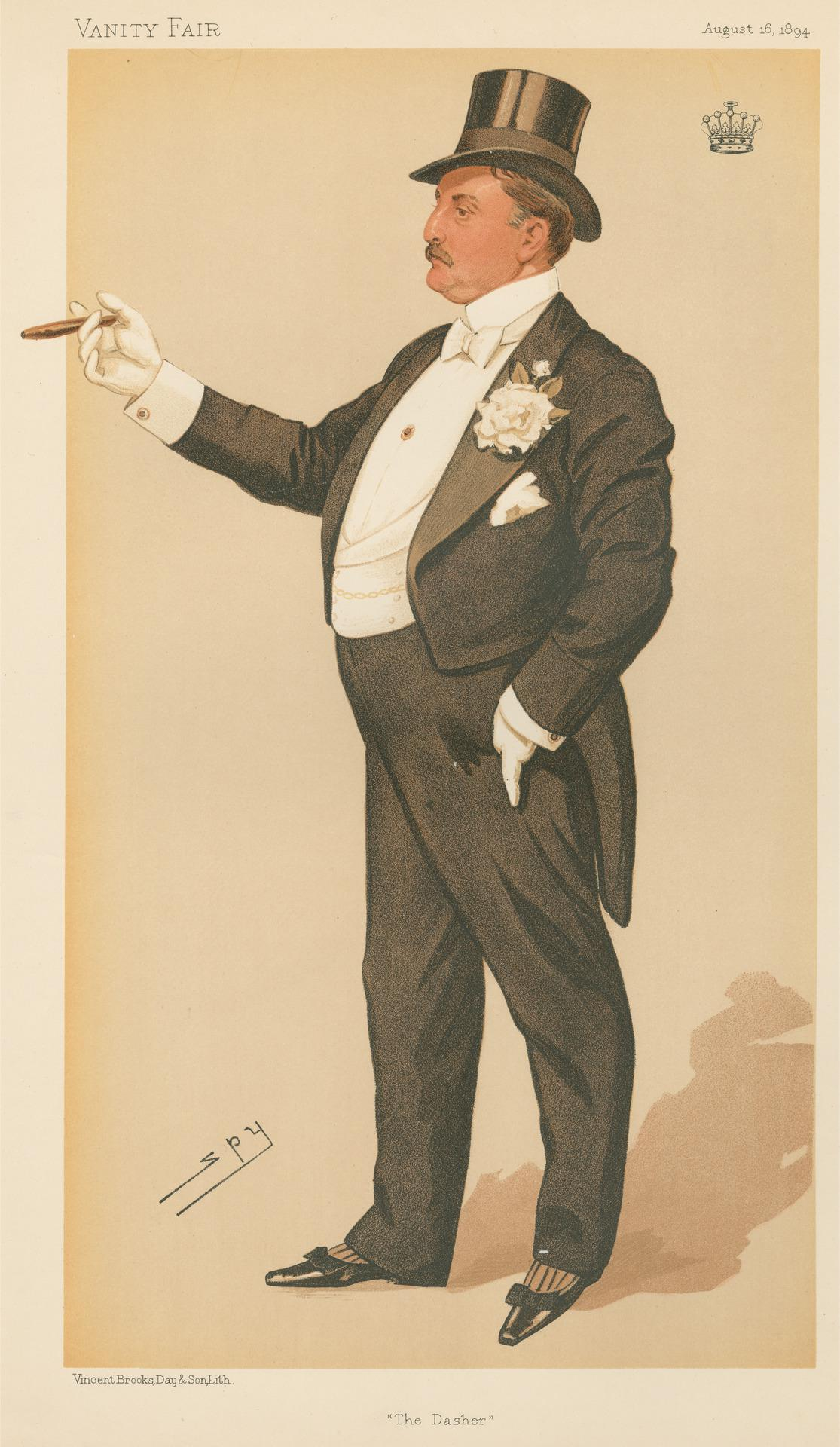
- Caricature of Lord Portarlington by Leslie Ward in Vanity Fair, 18 August 1894
- Born: Lionel George Henry Seymour Dawson-Damer; 19 August 1858
- Died: 31 August 1900 (aged 42); Ostend, Belgium
- Education: Eton College
- Spouse: Emma Andalusia Frere Kennedy (m. 1881; died 1900)
- Children: 5, including Lionel
- Parent(s): Lionel Dawson-Damer, 4th Earl of Portarlington; Hon. Harriet Lydia Montagu

Lionel George Henry Seymour Dawson-Damer, 5th Earl of Portarlington JP DL (19 August 1858 – 31 August 1900) was a British peer and landowner.

== Early life ==
Portarlington was born on 19 August 1858. He was the eldest son of Lionel Dawson-Damer, 4th Earl of Portarlington and Hon. Harriet Lydia Montagu. His younger sister was Hon. Mary Frances Seymour Dawson-Damer (wife of Hon. Algernon Henry Mills, son of the 1st Baron Hillingdon) and his younger brother was Hon. Montagu Francis Beauchamp Seymour Dawson-Damer (who married Margaret Stirling Macleod).

His father was the only son of the Hon. George Dawson-Damer (a younger son of the 1st Earl of Portarlington) and the former Mary Georgiana Emma Seymour (a daughter of Lord Hugh Seymour, fifth son of the 1st Marquess of Hertford). His grandfather served as the Comptroller of the Household and was MP for Portarlington and Dorchester. His maternal grandparents were the former Magdalen Hurley (a daughter of Lt.-Col. Thomas Hurley) and Henry Robinson-Montagu, 6th Baron Rokeby, Major-General commanding the Brigade of Guards.

He was educated at Eton College.

== Career ==
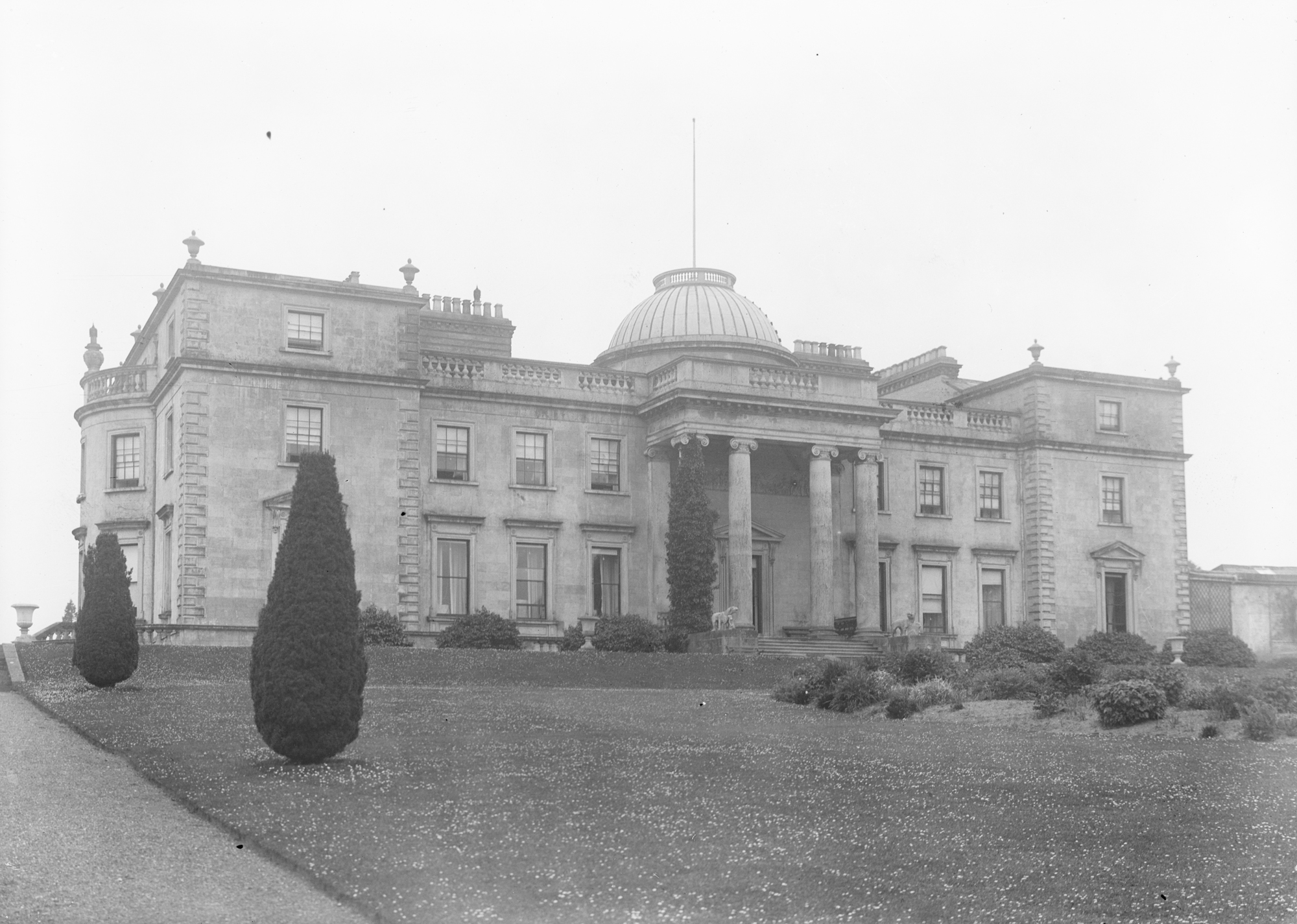
Emo Court (c. 1900–1920)

He was a Lieutenant in the 2nd Battalion, Scots Guards between 1878 and 1886. He later was Captain, and Honorary Major, in the Dorset Yeomanry Cavalry and was appointed Honorary Colonel of the 4th (Queen's County Militia) Battalion, Prince of Wales's Leinster Regiment (Royal Canadians) on 24 February 1894. He served as a Justice of the Peace for Dorset and Queen's County, as well as Deputy Lieutenant for Dorset.

Upon the death of his father on 17 December 1892, he succeeded as the 5th Earl of Portarlington, the 6th Baron Dawson of Dawson's Court, and the 6th Viscount Carlow. He served as a Conservative Irish representative peer in 1896, serving until his death in 1900. Upon inheriting the earldom, Portarlington also inherited Emo Court, a large neo-classical mansion near the village of Emo in County Laois, Ireland designed by the architect James Gandon in 1790 for John Dawson, 1st Earl of Portarlington. While construction began in the 1790s, work was not completed until the 1860s by the 3rd Earl of Portarlington.

=== Masonic fraternity ===
Lord Portarlington was a member of the Masonic fraternity and was appointed a Grand Officer in 1897 by the Prince of Wales (later King Edward VII), as Senior Grand Warden, which was the highest office in Grand Lodge next to the Deputy Grand Master. In Grand Chapter of Royal Arch Masons, he was Past Scribe N and Past Grand Warden in the Mark Degree, held concurrently.

== Personal life ==
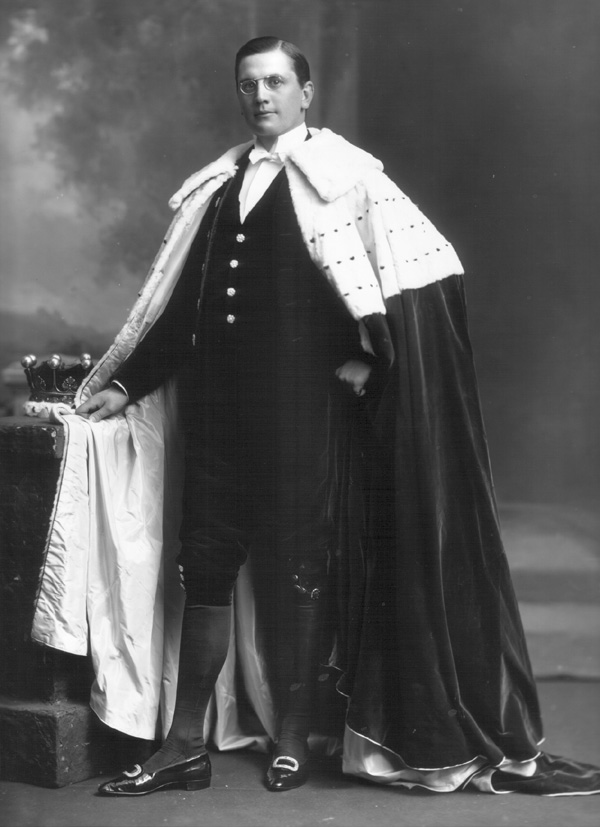
Photograph of his son, Lionel, at the Coronation of King George V, 1911.

On 25 October 1881, Viscount Carlow, as he was then known, married Emma Andalusia Frere Kennedy (1861–1929), the only daughter of Catherine Anne May and Lord Nigel Kennedy (a younger son of Archibald Kennedy, Earl of Cassillis, heir apparent to Marquess of Ailsa until his death). Together, they were the parents of:

- Lionel George Henry Seymour Dawson-Damer, 6th Earl of Portarlington (1883–1959), who married Winnifreda Yuill, only daughter of George Skelton Yuill, in 1907.
- Lady Aline Mary Seymour Dawson-Damer (1884–1953), who married Lt.-Col. Valentine Vivian, son of William Vivian, in 1904.
- Lady Christian Norah Dawson-Damer (1890–1959), who married Capt. Hon. Fergus Bowes-Lyon, son of Claude Bowes-Lyon, 14th Earl of Strathmore and Kinghorne and Cecilia Cavendish-Bentinck, in 1914. Fergus's sister was the future Queen Elizabeth the Queen Mother. After he was killed in 1915 during World War I, she married Capt. William Frederick Martin, a son of Charles William Wall Martin, in 1919.
- Hon. George Seymour Dawson-Damer (1892–1917), a Lieutenant in the 10th Hussars and Dorset Yeomanry who died from wounds received in action in World War I.
- Lady Moyra Marjorie Dawson-Damer (1897–1962), who married James Brinsley Peter FitzGerald, son of Peter David FitzGerald (son of Sir Peter FitzGerald, 19th Knight of Kerry), in 1924.

Lord Portarlington died of "congestion of the kidneys" at the Royal Palace Hotel at Ostend, on 31 August 1900 at age 42. He was succeeded in his titles by his eldest son, Lionel. After his death, his widow married Henry Portman, 3rd Viscount Portman, in 1901.

=== Descendants ===
Through his daughter Lady Aline, he was a grandfather of Celia Marjorie Vivian, who married Sir John Molesworth-St Aubyn, 14th Baronet, eldest son of Sir Hugh Molesworth-St Aubyn, 13th Baronet.

Through his daughter Lady Christian, he was a grandfather of Rosemary Lusia Bowes-Lyon (1915–1989), a first cousin of Queen Elizabeth II who married Edward Wilfred George Joicey-Cecil, youngest son of Col. Lord John Joicey-Cecil, MP for Stamford (a son of the 3rd Marquess of Exeter), in 1945.

Peerage of Ireland
Preceded by Lione Dawson-Damer	Earl of Portarlington; 1892–1900	Succeeded by Lionel Dawson-Damer
