= Lionel Dawson-Damer, 6th Earl of Portarlington =

The Right Honourable The Earl of Portarlington
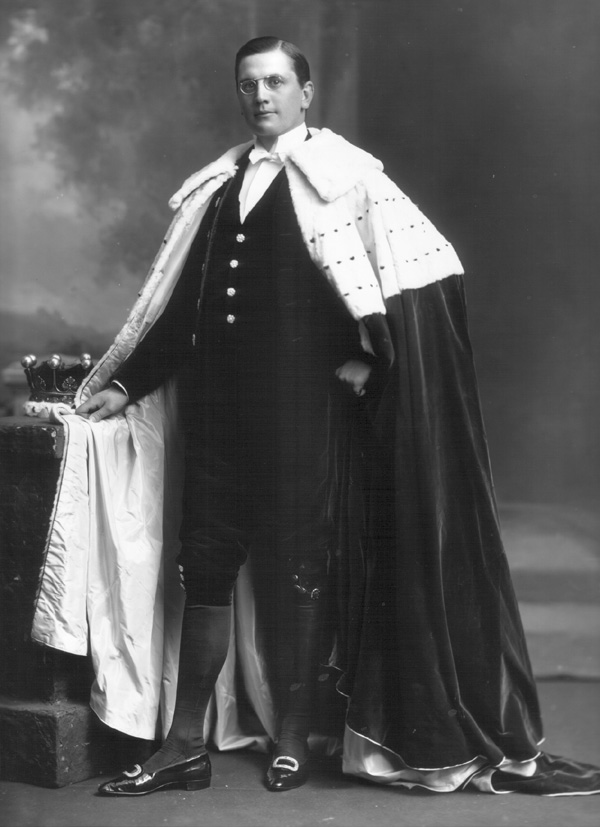
- Photograph of Lord Portarlington at the Coronation of King George V, 1911
- Born: Lionel Arthur Henry Seymour Dawson-Damer; 26 August 1883
- Died: 7 April 1959 (aged 75)
- Education: Eton College
- Spouse: Winnifreda Yuill (m. 1907; died 1959)
- Children: 1
- Parent(s): George Dawson-Damer, 5th Earl of Portarlington; Emma Andalusia Frere Kennedy

Lionel Arthur Henry Seymour Dawson-Damer, 6th Earl of Portarlington (26 August 1883 – 4 July 1959) was an Anglo-Irish peer and soldier.

== Early life ==
Dawson-Damer was born on 26 August 1883. He was the son of George Dawson-Damer, 5th Earl of Portarlington and Emma Andalusia Frere Kennedy. His younger siblings were Lady Aline Dawson-Damer (wife of Lt.-Col. Valentine Vivian), Lady Christian Dawson-Damer (wife of Capt. Hon. Fergus Bowes-Lyon, (Note: Lord Portarlington's brother-in-law, Capt. Hon. Fergus Bowes-Lyon, was the older brother of Elizabeth Bowes-Lyon (who later became the queen consort of King George VI) and maternal uncle of Elizabeth II. Capt. Bowes-Lyon was killed during the Battle of the Hohenzollern Redoubt in the Battle of Loos during World War I.) and Capt. William Frederick Martin), Lt. George Seymour Dawson-Damer (who was killed in action during World War I), Lady Moyra Dawson-Damer (wife of James Brinsley Peter FitzGerald, a grandson of Sir Peter FitzGerald, 19th Knight of Kerry). After his father's death, his mother married Henry Portman, 3rd Viscount Portman in September 1901. From this marriage, he had a younger half-sister, Hon. Selina Luisa Portman.

His paternal grandparents were Lionel Dawson-Damer, 4th Earl of Portarlington and Hon. Harriet Lydia Montagu (eldest daughter and co-heiress of Gen. Henry Montagu, 6th Baron Rokeby). His mother was the only daughter of Lord Nigel Kennedy (a younger son of Archibald Kennedy, Earl of Cassilis and brother to Archibald Kennedy, 2nd Marquess of Ailsa) and Catherine Anne May.

He was educated at Eton College.

== Career ==
Upon the death of his father on 31 August 1900 at the Royal Palace Hotel at Ostend, he succeeded as the 6th Earl of Portarlington, in the Peerage of Ireland, as well as the 7th Lord Dawson and the 7th Viscount Carlow. He served as one of the King's train-bearers at the Coronation of Edward VII and Alexandra at Westminster Abbey, London, on 9 August 1902.

Lord Portarlington was commissioned a lieutenant in the 4th (Militia) Battalion, the Prince of Wales's Leinster Regiment (Royal Canadians) on 21 December 1901. He transferred to the regular army with the appointment as second lieutenant in the Irish Guards on 28 January 1903, and served in the regiment between 1903 and 1905. A Lieutenant during World War I, he fought with the 4th Battalion, Leinster Regiment.

During the 1920s, Lord Portarlington and his wife were among the best-known personalities in London society. He was "celebrated for his ready wit and his perpetual good humour and high spirits."

=== Emo Park ===
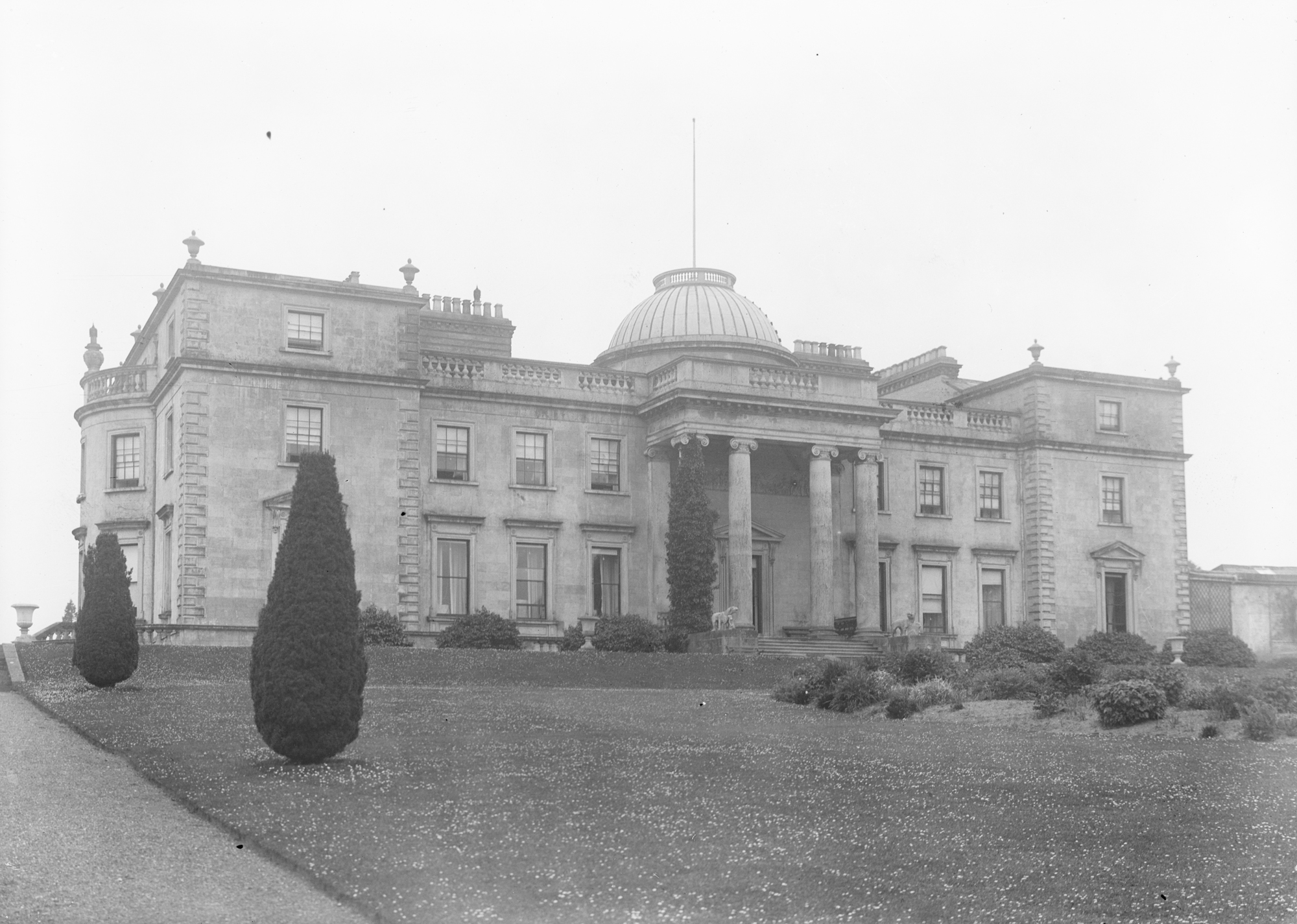
Emo Court (c. 1900–1920)

Upon inheriting the earldom, Portarlington also inherited Emo Court, a large neo-classical mansion near the village of Emo in County Laois, Ireland designed by the architect James Gandon in 1790 for John Dawson, 1st Earl of Portarlington. While construction began in the 1790s, work was not completed until the 1860s by the 3rd Earl of Portarlington.

After the outbreak of World War I in 1914, and, two years later, the Easter Rising and subsequent War of Independence, Lord Portarlington, like many Protestants and most of the Anglo-Irish nobility and gentry, left what would become the Irish Free State permanently, and the house was shut up. In 1920, the estate, which extended over nearly 20 square miles (52 km^{2}), was sold to the Irish Land Commission. The house remained unoccupied, while most of the land was distributed to local farmers. Lord Portarlington then made his home at Came House, the former seat of the Damer family in Dorsetshire.

== Personal life ==
On 2 February 1907, Lord Portarlington married the American, Winnifreda Yuill (1886–1975), a daughter of George Skelton Yuill of New Orleans, at the Holy Trinity Church, Sloane Street in London. Before they married, she was in London "under the chaperonage of her relative and fellow countrywoman, Lady Hay, widow of Sir Robert Hay, of Smithfield, and sister of the late William Butler Duncan, of 1 Fifth Avenue, New York." Together, they were the parents of:

- George Lionel Seymour Dawson-Damer, Viscount Carlow (1907–1944), an Air Commodore in the Auxiliary Air Force; he married Peggy Cambie, daughter of Charles Cambie (the London manager of the Canadian Bank of Commerce), in 1937.

He died on 4 July 1959, at age 75. As his eldest son predeceased him, he was succeeded in his titles by his grandson, George. His widow, the dowager Countess of Portarlington, died in 1975.

=== Descendants ===
Through his son George, he was a grandfather of George Lionel Yuill Seymour Dawson-Damer (b. 1938), who served as a Page of Honour to Queen Elizabeth II before succeeding his grandfather as the 7th Earl of Portarlington, and Hon. Lionel John Charles Seymour Dawson-Damer (1940–2000), who died in a motor-racing accident at Goodwood House.

== Notes ==
Peerage of Ireland
Preceded by George Dawson-Damer	Earl of Portarlington; 1900–1959	Succeeded by George Dawson-Damer
