= Portarlington =

Portarlington may refer to:

== Places ==
- Portarlington, County Laois, on the border between County Laois and County Offaly, Ireland
  - Portarlington railway station
  - Portarlington (Parliament of Ireland constituency), a constituency until 1801 in Ireland
  - Portarlington (UK Parliament constituency), 1801-1885
  - Portarlington GAA, a Gaelic football club
  - Portarlington RFC, a rugby union club
- Portarlington, Victoria, Australia
  - Portarlington Football Club, an Australian rules football club

== People ==
- Earl of Portarlington, a title in the Peerage of Ireland
- John Dawson, 2nd Earl of Portarlington (1781-1845), British Army officer
- Henry Dawson-Damer, 3rd Earl of Portarlington (1822-1889), Irish peer
- Lionel Dawson-Damer, 4th Earl of Portarlington (1832-1892), British politician
- Aidan Howlin, 5th Earl of Portarlington (1864-1920), British barrister
