= Damer =

Damer is a surname. Notable people with the surname include:

- Anne Seymour Damer, née Conway, (1748–1828), English sculptor
- Damer Leslie Allen, Irish-born early twentieth-century aviator
- George Damer, 2nd Earl of Dorchester PC, PC (Ire) (1746–1808), British politician, styled Viscount Milton between 1792 and 1798
- George Dawson-Damer (1788–1856), British Conservative Party politician
- Henry Dawson-Damer, 3rd Earl of Portarlington KP (1822–1889), Irish peer
- Joseph Damer, 1st Earl of Dorchester (1718–1798), wealthy landowner associated with reshaping Milton Abbey and creating the village of Milton Abbas in Dorset, England
- Lady Christian Norah Dawson-Damer (1890–1959), the sister-in-law of Queen Elizabeth the Queen Mother
- Lionel Dawson-Damer, 4th Earl of Portarlington (1832–1892), British peer and Conservative politician
- T. Edward Damer, philosopher and author
- the Damer Islands (Kepulauan Damer), previously spelt "Damar Islands", in Maluku province of Indonesia
- Damer Hall, a former school and former theatre in Dublin, Ireland
- Damer House, a Georgian house on the grounds of Roscrea Castle in County Tipperary, Ireland
- Dawson-Damer family, a powerful and wealthy multigenerational Anglo-Irish family

== See also ==
- Mine damer og herrer, 2010 studio album by Danish singer Kim Larsen
- Dahmer (disambiguation)

Media related to Damer at Wikimedia Commons
