= Margaret Erskine of Dun =

The Most Honourable The Marchioness of Ailsa
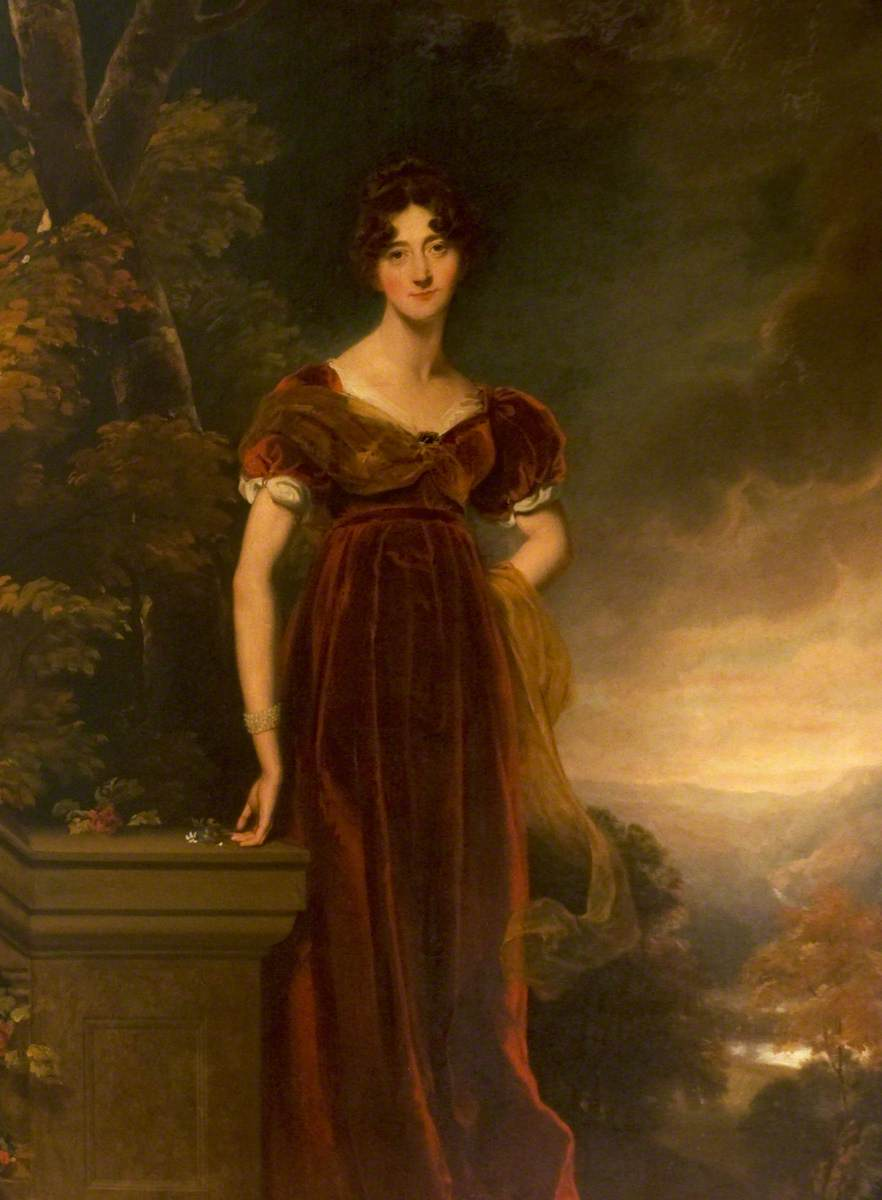
- Margaret Kennedy, Marchioness of Ailsa
- Born: Margaret Erskine; 1772
- Died: 5 January 1848 (aged 75–76)
- Spouse: Archibald Kennedy, 1st Marquess of Ailsa (1793–1846)
- Issue: 6, including Archibald, Margaret, John
- Parents: John Erskine of Dun; Mary Baird

Margaret Kennedy, Marchioness of Ailsa (1772 – 5 January 1848) was a Scottish noblewoman.

== Early life ==
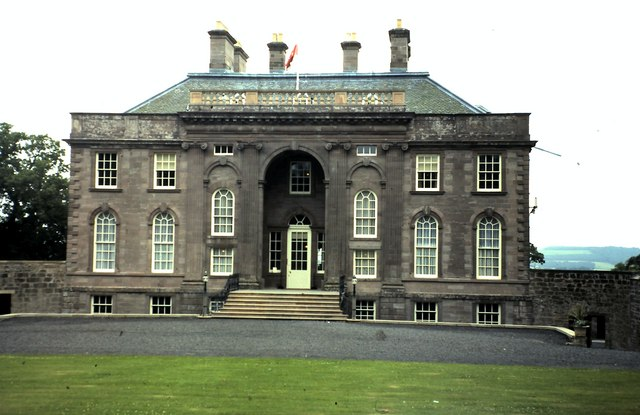
House of Dun

Margaret was born in 1772. She was the second daughter of Mary (née Baird) Erskine and John Erskine of Dun, Forfarshire. He had two siblings, Capt. William John Erskine of the 9th Light Dragoons (who was killed in the Irish Rebellion at the Battle of Kilcullen), and Alicia Erskine of Dun (who died unmarried in 1824).

Her paternal grandparents were John Erskine of Dun (only son of David Erskine, Lord Dun), and Margaret Inglis (a daughter of Sir John Inglis, 2nd Baronet). Her mother was the eldest daughter of William Baird, Esq. of Newbyth House, Haddingtonshire. Her maternal uncle was Sir David Baird, 1st Baronet.

== Personal life ==
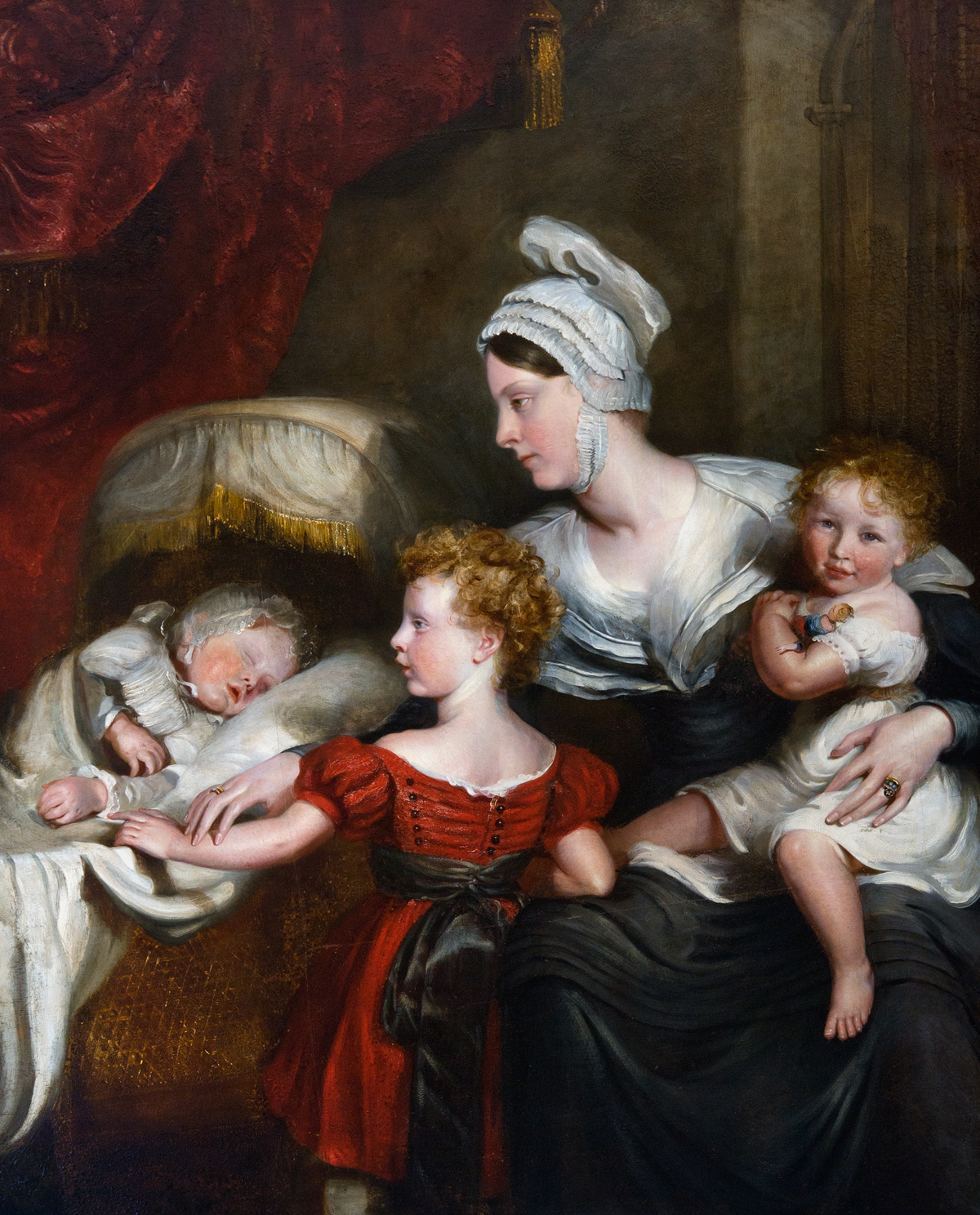
Portrait of her daughter-in-law, Lady Augusta with her three grandchildren, by John Hayter, c. 1830

On 1 June 1793, she married Archibald Kennedy, Lord Kennedy, who the following year succeeded as 12th Earl of Cassilis. Margaret inherited the House of Dun, a Georgian house, in 1824, and achieved the rank of Marchioness when her husband was created Marquess of Ailsa in 1831. Together, they had six children:

- Archibald Kennedy, Earl of Cassilis (1794–1832), who married Eleanor Allardyce, daughter and heiress of Alexander Allardyce of Dunnottar, Kincardine, and predeceased both of his parents.
- Lady Anne Kennedy (1797–1877), who married Sir David Baird, 2nd Baronet.
- Lady Mary Kennedy (1799–1886), who married Richard Oswald, son of Richard Alexander Oswald, MP for Ayr of Auchincruive Estate.
- Lady Margaret Kennedy (1800–1889), who married Thomas Radclyffe-Livingstone-Eyre.
- Hon. John Kennedy-Erskine (1802–1831), who assumed the additional name of Erskine after inheriting the Dun estate from his aunt Alicia Erskine in 1824; he married Lady Augusta FitzClarence, an illegitimate daughter of King William IV and Dorothea Jordan in 1827.
- Lady Alicia Jane Kennedy (1805–1887), who married Jonathan Peel, Secretary of State for War.

Lord Ailsa died in 1846 and was succeeded in his titles by their grandson, Archibald. Lady Ailsa died on 5 January 1848.

=== Descendants ===
Through her eldest son Archibald, she was a grandmother of nine, including Archibald Kennedy, 2nd Marquess of Ailsa.

Through her second son John, she was a grandmother of three, Capt. William Henry Kennedy-Erskine of the 17th Lancers; Wilhelmina "Mina" Kennedy-Erskine (who married his first cousin, William FitzClarence, 2nd Earl of Munster); and Augusta Anne "Millicent" Mary Kennedy-Erskine (who married James Hay Erskine-Wemyss, son of Rear-Admiral James Erskine Wemyss).

== Painting ==
Margaret Erskine of Dun is the title given to the painting by William Owen which can be found on the first floor of Culzean Castle.
