= Charles Cockerell =

Charles Cockerell may refer to:

- Charles Robert Cockerell (1788–1863), English architect, archaeologist, and writer
- Sir Charles Cockerell, 1st Baronet (1755–1837), English official of the East India Company and politician
