= Dropmore Press =

British private press

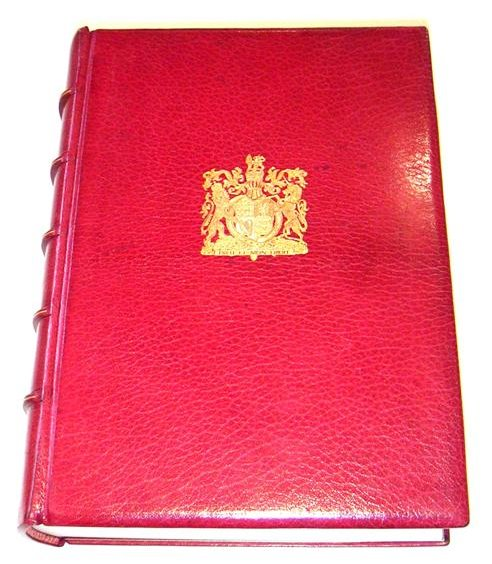
Catalogue of the Royal Philatelic Collection, published 1952, in the standard leather binding, out of the slip-case

The Dropmore Press was a British private press founded in 1945 by the newspaper-owner Gomer Berry, 1st Viscount Kemsley.

Kemsley acquired the type, paper-stock, printing equipment and press-man of the Corvinus Press, which closed in 1945, following the death of its owner Viscount Carlow in the previous year. He named it after his home, Dropmore Park, near Taplow. The Press was run by a committee of directors, who selected texts and oversaw the work of the press-man, Arthur Harry Cardew. Kemsley and his fellow directors, among whom Edward Shanks was perhaps the most active, attempted to run the Press on commercial grounds (Carlow's Corvinus Press had been a hobby), with limited success. Most of the books were printed in editions of between 300 and 1000 copies, and their style was generally formal and similar to the better 'trade' publications of the period. The books appear staid, both in design and literary terms, when compared with the publications of the Corvinus Press. Some Dropmore Press books were printed by commercial printing-firms, rather than by Cardew at the Press itself.

Around 1950 the journalist Ian Fleming joined the board of directors, though his influence was at first relatively minor. In 1954 the Press was in severe financial difficulties and was offered to Fleming, who apparently agreed to buy it although the deal was never finalised. The press closed in 1955, having published more than forty books, some under the parallel imprint of the Queen Anne Press.

Dropmore issued minor works by Evelyn Waugh (who complained about the inaccuracy of the text), by T. S. Eliot, and by the historian Sir Arthur Bryant. It also published an important catalogue of The Royal Philatelic Collection by Sir John Wilson and Clarence Winchester in 1952. Dropmore also produced a relatively large quantity of printed ephemera in the form of catalogues and prospectuses for its publications, and published Book Handbook, a bibliophile magazine which developed into The Book Collector (a project with which Fleming was heavily involved at this period).
