= Lord Dawson =

Lord Dawson may refer to:

- Bertrand Dawson, 1st Viscount Dawson of Penn (1864–1945), physician to the British royal family
- Lionel Dawson-Damer, 6th Earl of Portarlington (1883–1959), Anglo-Irish peer and soldier
- Thomas Dawson, Lord Dawson (1948–2007), Scottish judge
