= Baron Dawson =

Baron Dawson may be:

- Baron Dawson (Peerage of Ireland), the third title of the Earl of Portarlington
- Baron Dawson of Penn, the former title of the Viscount Dawson of Penn
