= Corvinus Press =

English private press

The Corvinus Press was a private press established by George Lionel Seymour Dawson-Damer, Viscount Carlow (1907–1944) in Red Lion Court, off Fleet Street, London in early 1936. Carlow was a keen book-collector, amateur linguist and typographer, and ran the Press purely as a hobby, with the help of a press-man (latterly Arthur Harry Cardew) and secretary. He was friendly with many of the leading literary figures of the age, some of whom allowed him to print their works at his Press. Corvinus published new work by T. E. Lawrence, James Joyce, Wyndham Lewis, Edmund Blunden, Stefan Zweig, Walter de la Mare and H. E. Bates.

Berthold Wolpe designed Zweig's George Frederick Handel's Resurrection. Only thirty-two were printed.

Carlow was interested in contemporary European typography, and bought new types from the Bauer typefoundry at Frankfurt am Main and other European founders, which he often used in an experimental way at the Corvinus Press. His taste in binding was also individual, and he generally produced a few special copies of each book which he had bound by one of the leading craft bookbinders of the age.

During the war, Carlow undertook diplomatic duties elsewhere in Europe, but oversaw the work of the Press at a distance. He was killed in an aeroplane crash on 17 April 1944. The Press continued to operate for around a year while Cardew completed some of the books which Carlow had chosen for publication, before the printing equipment and press-man were acquired by the Dropmore Press in 1945.
