= James Anthony Lawson =

Irish academic, lawyer and judge

James Anthony Lawson, PC (Ire), QC (1817–1887) was an Irish academic, lawyer and judge.

== Background and education ==
Lawson was born in Waterford. He was the eldest son of James Lawson and Mary Anthony, daughter of Joseph Anthony, and was educated at the endowed school there. Having entered Trinity College Dublin, he was elected a scholar in 1836, obtained a senior moderatorship in 1837 and earned a gold medallist and first-class honours in ethics and logic. He graduated with a BA in 1838, an LLB in 1841 and LLD in 1850. He served as Whately professor of political economy from 1840 to 1845.

== Legal and judicial career ==
Lawson was called to the Irish Bar in 1840 and soon obtained a good practice, especially in the courts of equity. On 29 January 1857, he was gazetted a Queen's Counsel, elected bencher of King's Inns, Dublin, 1861, and acted as Law Adviser to the Lord Lieutenant of Ireland from 1858 to 1859. He was appointed Solicitor-General for Ireland in February 1861 and in 1865 Attorney-General for Ireland, when he was sworn a member of the Irish privy council.

As attorney-general he had in to grapple with the Fenian conspiracy of 1865, when he suppressed the Irish People newspaper, and the leaders of that movement were arrested and prosecuted. On 4 April 1857, he had unsuccessfully contested the seat for Dublin University, but on 15 July 1865 won the seat of Portarlington for the Liberals. However, he was defeated in the general election of December 1868. He was appointed fourth justice of the Court of Common Pleas, Ireland, in December 1868 and held the post till June 1882, when he was transferred to the Queen's Bench division.

During the Land League agitation he presided over several important political trials. The Irish National Invincibles attempted to assassinate him on 11 November 1882 while he was walking in central Dublin, for which Patrick Delaney was sentenced to 10 years' imprisonment on 3 January 1883. (Delaney pleaded guilty in May 1883 for his part in the May 1882 Phoenix Park Murders; his mandatory death sentence was commuted to life imprisonment, reduced to 10 years after his 1889 testimony to the Parnell Commission.)

Lawson was made one of the Irish Church Commissioners in July 1869, gazetted a privy councillor in England on 18 May 1870, acted as a commissioner for the Great Seal of Ireland from March to December 1874, was a vice-president of the Dublin Statistical Society and became a DCL of Oxford in 1884.

== Personal life ==
Lawson died at Shankill, near Dublin, on 10 August 1887. In 1842, he married Jane Merrick, eldest daughter of Samuel Merrick of Cork, with whom he had a son, James. In the 1860s he built a Victorian gothic mansion by the sea in Shankill called Clontra, which was designed by Deane & Woodward.

== Publications ==
- ‘Five Lectures on Political Economy,’ 1844.
- ‘Duties and Obligations involved in Mercantile Relations. A lecture,’ 1855.
- ‘Speech at the Election for Members to serve in Parliament for the University of Dublin,’ 1857. With H. Connor he compiled
- ‘Reports of Cases in High Court of Chancery of Ireland during the time of Lord Chancellor Sugden,’ 1865.
- 'Hymni Usitati Latine Redditi, with Other Verses'. Kegan Paul, Trench & Co. 1883.
- 'A Century of Irish Government' [Manuscript life of Sir Thomas Larcom, Bart], Edinburgh Review, no. 336, 1886.

== Arms ==
Coat of arms of James Anthony Lawson

Crest
An arm embowed in armour the hand holding a broken spear Proper.
Escutcheon
Azure a castle Argent supporting in bend a scaling ladder Proper.

Parliament of the United Kingdom
Preceded by Lionel Dawson-Damer	Member of Parliament for Portarlington; 1865–1868	Succeeded by Lionel Dawson-Damer
Legal offices
Preceded by Thomas O'Hagan	Solicitor-General for Ireland; 1861–1865	Succeeded by Edward Sullivan
Preceded by Thomas O'Hagan	Attorney-General for Ireland; 1865–1866	Succeeded by John Edward Walsh
