= Thomas Hudson (MP) =

British politician

Thomas Hudson (18 October 1772 – 14 April 1852) was a British politician.

Hudson was born in Wigton, and became a wine merchant, building a successful business, based on Mark Lane in London. He invested some of the profits in an estate in Shropshire, and retired from the business in about 1827. He also owned shares in the East India Company. In 1830, he became First Prothonotary of the Court of Common Pleas, serving until the office was abolished, in 1837.

Hudson stood as an independent in Malmesbury at the 1826 UK general election, failing to win the seat, and unsuccessful at getting the result overturned on petition. He next stood as a Whig in the 1831 UK general election in Evesham, winning the seat. He held the seat until the 1835 UK general election, when he stood down.

Hudson died in 1852. His Shropshire property was passed to his nephew, Charles Donaldson, who appended "Hudson" to his name.

Parliament of the United Kingdom
Preceded by Charles Cockerell; Archibald Kennedy	Member of Parliament for Evesham; 1831 – 1835; With: Charles Cockerell	Succeeded by Charles Cockerell; Peter Borthwick
