= Sir Charles Cockerell, 1st Baronet =

English official of the East India Company and politician

Sir Charles Cockerell, 1st Baronet (18 February 1755 – 6 January 1837) was a Somerset-born Englishman who prospered as an official of the East India Company (EIC) and became a politician. He sat in the House of Commons for most of the period between 1802 and 1837, sitting for five different constituencies.

== Life and career ==
He was born in Bishop's Hull, Somerset, the son of John Cockerell and Frances, daughter of John Jackson of Clapham. Through his mother Cockerell was the great-great nephew of the diarist Samuel Pepys.

After education at Sharpe's school in Bromley-by-Bow and later Winchester College between 1767 and 1769, Cockerell arrived in Bengal, India in 1776 as a writer (clerk) for the EIC's surveyor-general's office. He became friends with Warren Hastings, the first Governor-General of India and Richard Wellesley, 1st Marquess Wellesley, brother of the Duke of Wellington. Whilst employed by the EIC he was also a partner and later principal of the Calcutta bank of Cockerell, Trail & Co. During the Fourth Anglo-Mysore War (1798-9), Cockerell assisted Wellesley as commander of the civil service military force and through financial arrangements with the Bengal government. As a result of these services he was raised to the Baronetage of England on 25 September 1809.

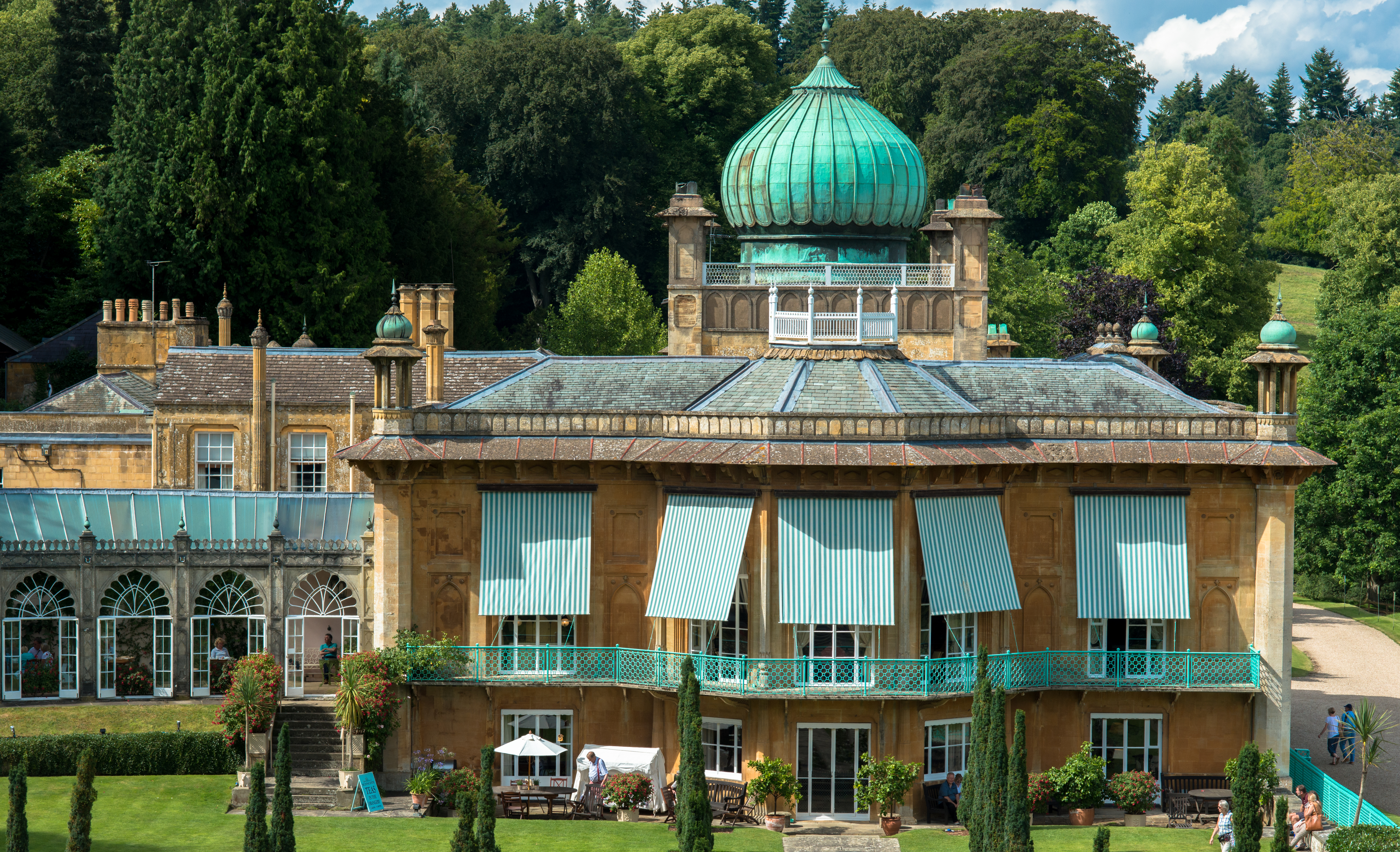
Sezincote House, where Cockerel lived on his return from India.

In 1801 he returned to England to live at Sezincote House in Gloucestershire, which he had inherited from his elder brother, John. He then commissioned another brother, Samuel Pepys Cockerell, to build him a house "in the Indian style".

Whilst remaining as an agent for the EIC, Cockerell was introduced as a Member of Parliament for Tregony by Richard Barwell, whom he had known in India. He was a silent supporter of Henry Addington's ministry and considered doubtful by William Pitt the Younger on the latter's reelection in 1804. After failing to secure a seat in the 1806 Election, Cockerell was returned to Parliament for Lostwithiel in January 1807. He was subsequently MP for Bletchingley from 1809 to 1812, Seaford from 1816 to 1818 and for Evesham from 1819 to 1837. Cockerell served as Mayor of Evesham from 1810 to 1833.

== Personal life ==
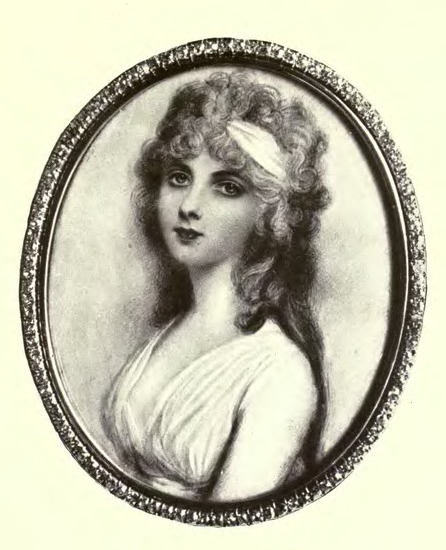
Harriet Rushout, portrait miniature by Andrew Plimer

On 11 March 1789 in Calcutta, he married Maria-Tryphena (d. 8 Oct. 1789), daughter of Sir Charles William Blunt, 3rd Baronet of the Blunt baronets. He married secondly on 13 February 1808 the Honourable Harriet Rushout, daughter of John Rushout, 1st Baron Northwick. The couple had a son, Charles Rushout Cockerell (b.1809), who succeeded to the baronetcy and two daughters, Harriet-Anne and Elizabeth Maria (d.1832). Charles Rushout Cockerell married the Honourable Cecilia-Olivia, daughter of Thomas Foley, 3rd Baron Foley in 1834.

Parliament of the United Kingdom
Preceded by John Nicholls; Sir Lionel Copley, Bt	Member of Parliament for Tregony; 1802 – 1806; With: Marquess of Blandford 1802–04; George Woodford Thellusson 1804–06	Succeeded by Godfrey Wentworth Wentworth; James O'Callaghan
Preceded by William Dickinson the Viscount Lismore	Member of Parliament for Lostwithiel; January 1807 – May 1807; With: the Viscount Lismore	Succeeded by George Peter Holford; Ebenezer Maitland
Preceded by Thomas Freeman-Heathcote; William Kenrick	Member of Parliament for Bletchingley; 1809 – 1812; With: William Kenrick	Succeeded by William Kenrick; Sir Charles Talbot, Bt
Preceded by John Leach; Charles Rose Ellis	Member of Parliament for Seaford; 1816 – 1818; With: Charles Rose Ellis	Succeeded by Charles Rose Ellis; George Watson-Taylor
Preceded by William Rouse-Boughton; Humphrey Howorth	Member of Parliament for Evesham; 1819 – 1837; With: Humphrey Howorth to 1820; William Rouse-Boughton 1820–26; Edward Davis Protheroe 1826–30; Lord Kennedy 1830–31; Thomas Hudson 1831–35; Peter Borthwick from 1835	Succeeded by Peter Borthwick; George Rushout
Baronetage of the United Kingdom
New creation	Baronet (of Sezincote); 1809 – 1837	Succeeded by Charles Cockerell
