= Margaret Radclyffe Livingstone Eyre =

Scottish aristocrat (1800–1889)

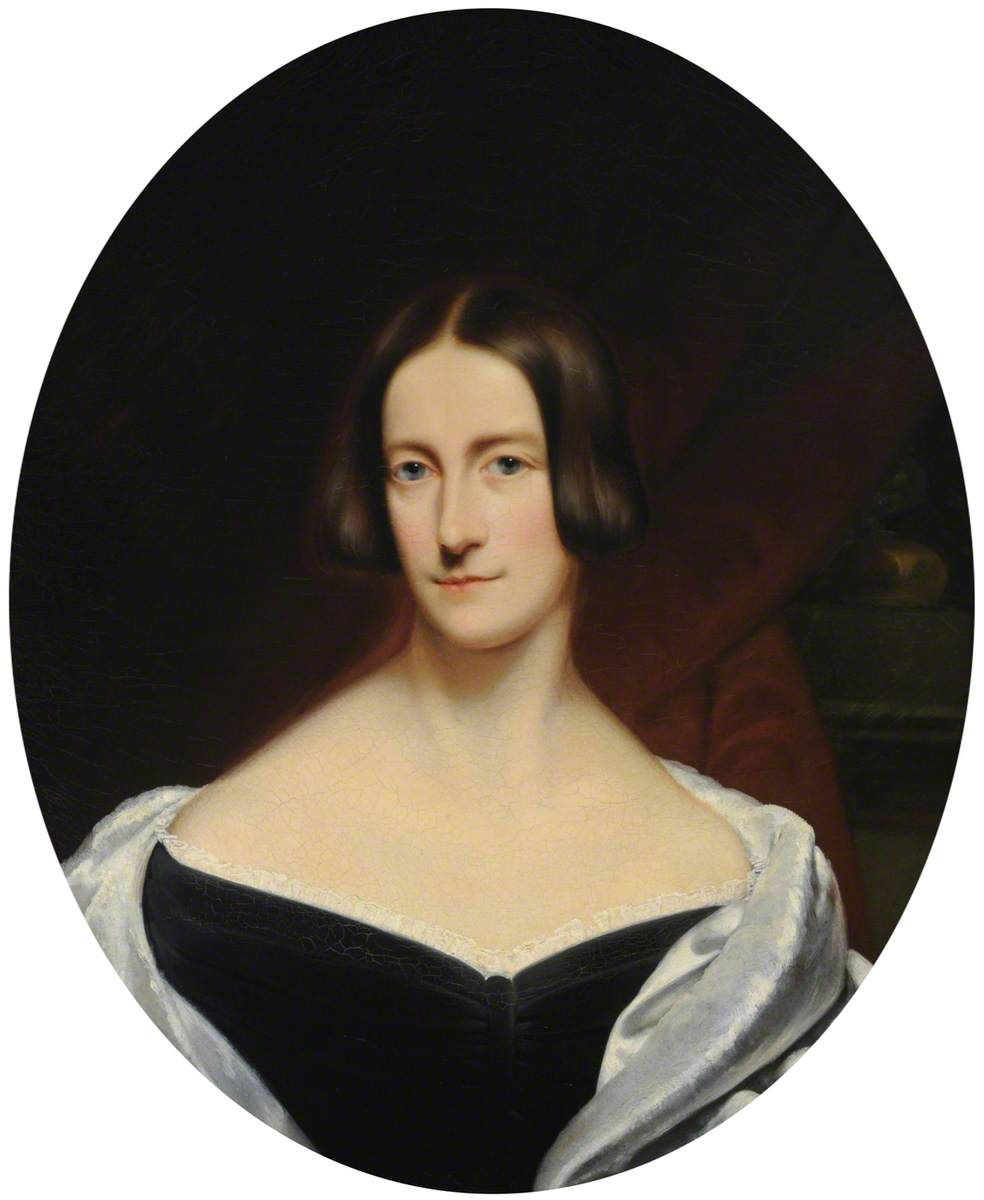
- by Orazio de Manara
- Born: Lady Margaret Kennedy; 16 June 1800; Culzean Castle, Scotland
- Died: 3 September 1889 (aged 89); London, England
- Other name: Countess of Newburgh (erroneously)
- Occupation: Philanthropist
- Spouse: Thomas Radclyffe-Livingstone-Eyre (m. 1817; died 1833)
- Parents: Archibald Kennedy, 1st Marquess of Ailsa (father); Margaret Erskine of Dun (mother)
- Relatives: Archibald Kennedy (brother)

Lady Margaret Radclyffe Livingstone Eyre (née Kennedy, 16 June 1800 – 3 September 1889), later incorrectly called the Countess of Newburgh, was a Scottish aristocrat and philanthropist. She was said to be an "archetype of the nineteenth-century charitable Catholic lady" who gave a good portion of her income to good works.

== Life ==
She was born in 1800. Her parents were Margaret (born Erskine) and Archibald Kennedy, twelfth Earl of Cassillis. Her politician (and gambler) father became the first Marquess of Ailsa in 1831.

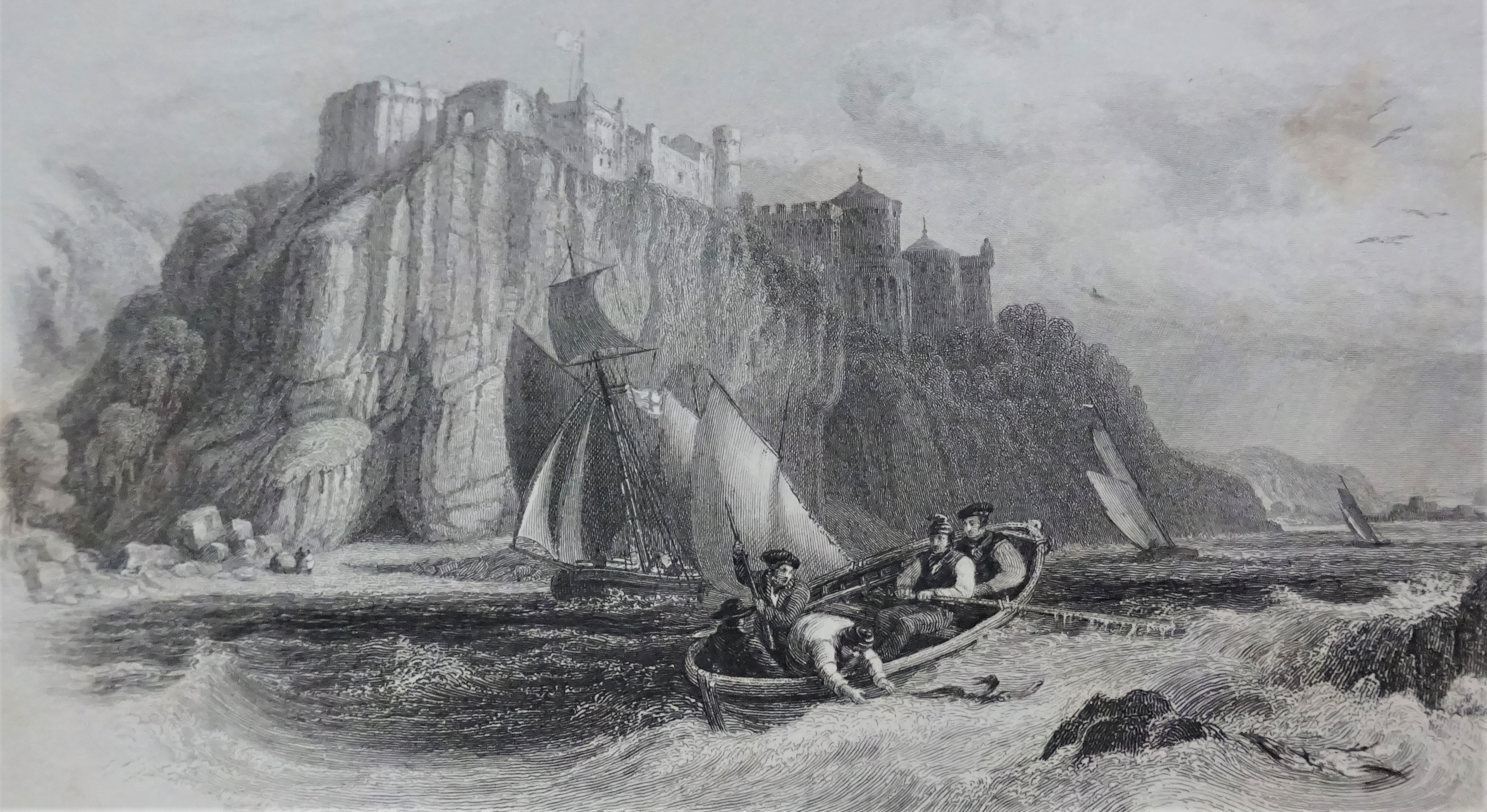
Culzean Castle was her wedding venue

She married at her family seat of Culzean Castle in Scotland on 14 November 1817 to Thomas Radclyffe-Livingstone-Eyre. Ten years later her father in law, Francis Radclyffe-Livingstone-Eyre, died. He was a potential holder of the disputed title of the Earl of Newburgh and on his death his son, her husband, boldly (and erroneously) took the title of Earl of Newburgh and Margaret became Margaret, Countess of Newburgh. Six years later her husband died and she became a widowed Countess.

She sat for a portrait by Orazio de Manara which is now held by the National Trust at Hardwick Hall, Derbyshire.

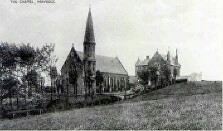
Our Lady and St Cuthbert Catholic Church in Maybole was opened in 1878 and it was funded by Eyre

By 1850 she had converted to the Catholic church and she worked with and was good friends with fellow aristocrats Lady Georgiana Fullerton and Cecil Chetwynd Kerr, Marchioness of Lothian. The Marchioness of Lothian like herself was a recent Scottish Catholic convert who had built a church in Jedburgh. Georgiana Fullerton was another recent aristocratic convert who was of independent means. She was a successful writer and all of her royalties went to charity.

Eyre spent nearly £500 a year on charitable causes. She supported the Westminster Sisters of Charity and gave out pensions to needy individuals. The gifts were not given ostentatiously but modestly. Eyre did not use the gifts to build up her own position in society. Near where she lived at Maybole she almost single-handedly funded a new Roman Catholic church.

Eyre went blind in her old age and took to a bath chair, but she could still meet her friends who were not all Catholics. She died in London in 1889. Her biography in the ODNB describes her as a "archetype of the nineteenth-century charitable Catholic lady".
