= Lionel Dawson-Damer, 4th Earl of Portarlington =

British peer and Conservative politician

The Right Honourable The Earl of Portarlington DL
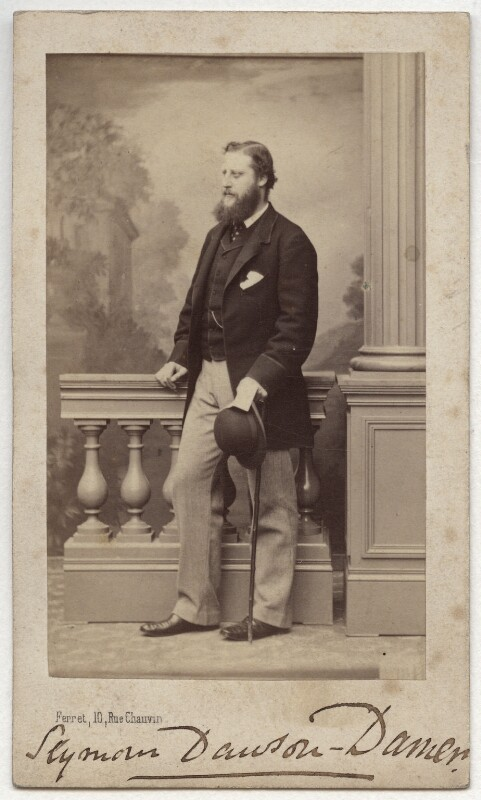
- Photograph of Dawson-Damer, 1860s

Member of Parliament for Portarlington
- In office 1868–1880
- Preceded by: James Anthony Lawson
- Succeeded by: Hon. Bernard FitzPatrick
- In office 1857–1865
- Preceded by: Francis Plunkett Dunne
- Succeeded by: James Anthony Lawson

Personal details
- Born: Lionel Seymour William Dawson-Damer; 7 April 1832
- Died: 17 December 1892 (aged 60)
- Party: Conservative
- Spouse: Hon. Harriett Lydia Montagu (after 1855)
- Children: 3, including George
- Parent(s): Hon. George Dawson-Damer; Mary Georgiana Emma Seymour

Lionel Seymour William Dawson-Damer, 4th Earl of Portarlington DL (7 April 1832 – 17 December 1892), known as Lionel Dawson-Damer until 1889, was a British peer and Conservative politician.

== Early life ==
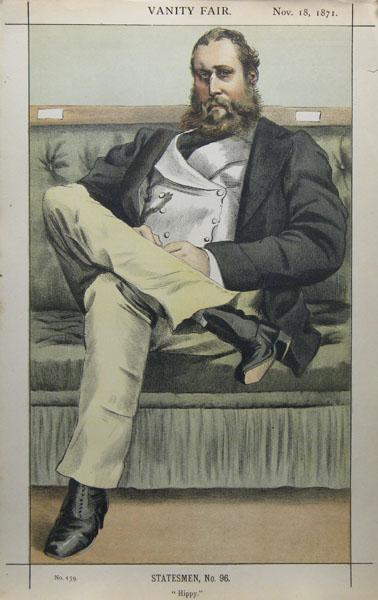
"Hippy" Dawson-Damer as caricatured by James Tissot in Vanity Fair, November 1871

Portarlington was the only son of the Hon. George Dawson-Damer and the former Mary Georgiana Emma Seymour. Among his siblings were Lady Georgiana (wife of the 3rd Earl Fortescue) and Lady Constance (wife of Sir John Leslie, 1st Baronet).

His father was a younger son of John Dawson, 1st Earl of Portarlington and Lady Caroline Stuart (a daughter of Prime Minister John Stuart, 3rd Earl of Bute). His maternal grandparents were Lord Hugh Seymour (a younger son of the 1st Marquess of Hertford) and the former Lady Anne Horatia Waldegrave (a daughter of the 2nd Earl Waldegrave).

According to a private letter between Louisa and Eddy Eliot, dated 27 September 1841, their brother's friend "Seymour Damer is gone to school in Liverpool".

== Career ==
Portarlington was returned to Parliament for the Portarlington constituency in 1857, a seat he held until 1865 and again between 1868 and 1880. In 1889 he succeeded his cousin Henry as fourth Earl of Portarlington. However, as this was an Irish peerage he was not allowed to take a seat in the House of Lords.

He was promoted from cornet to lieutenant in the Dorsetshire Yeomanry on 20 April 1858.

== Personal life ==
Lord Portarlington married the Hon. Harriett Lydia Montagu, eldest daughter and co-heiress of Henry Montagu, 6th Baron Rokeby, on 19 April 1855. Together, they were the parents of several children, including:

- Lionel George Henry Seymour Dawson-Damer, 5th Earl of Portarlington (1858–1900), who married Emma Andalusia Frere Kennedy, the only daughter of Lord Nigel Kennedy (a younger son of Archibald Kennedy, Earl of Cassillis, heir apparent to Marquess of Ailsa until his death).
- Hon. Mary Frances Seymour Dawson-Damer (1860–1895), who married Hon. Algernon Henry Mills, son of Charles Mills, 1st Baron Hillingdon and Lady Louisa Isabella Lascelles (a daughter of the 3rd Earl of Harewood), in 1880.
- Hon. Montagu Francis Beauchamp Seymour Dawson-Damer (1864–1898), who married Margaret Stirling Macleod, daughter of Thomas Macleod, in 1896.

He died on 17 December 1892, aged 60, and was succeeded in the earldom by his eldest son, Lionel George. Lady Portarlington died in November 1894.

Parliament of the United Kingdom
Preceded by Francis Plunkett Dunne	Member of Parliament for Portarlington; 1857–1865	Succeeded by James Anthony Lawson
Preceded by James Anthony Lawson	Member of Parliament for Portarlington; 1868–1880	Succeeded by Hon. Bernard FitzPatrick
Peerage of Ireland
Preceded by Henry Dawson-Damer	Earl of Portarlington; 1889–1892	Succeeded by George Dawson-Damer
