= Emo Court =

Irish neo-classical mansion

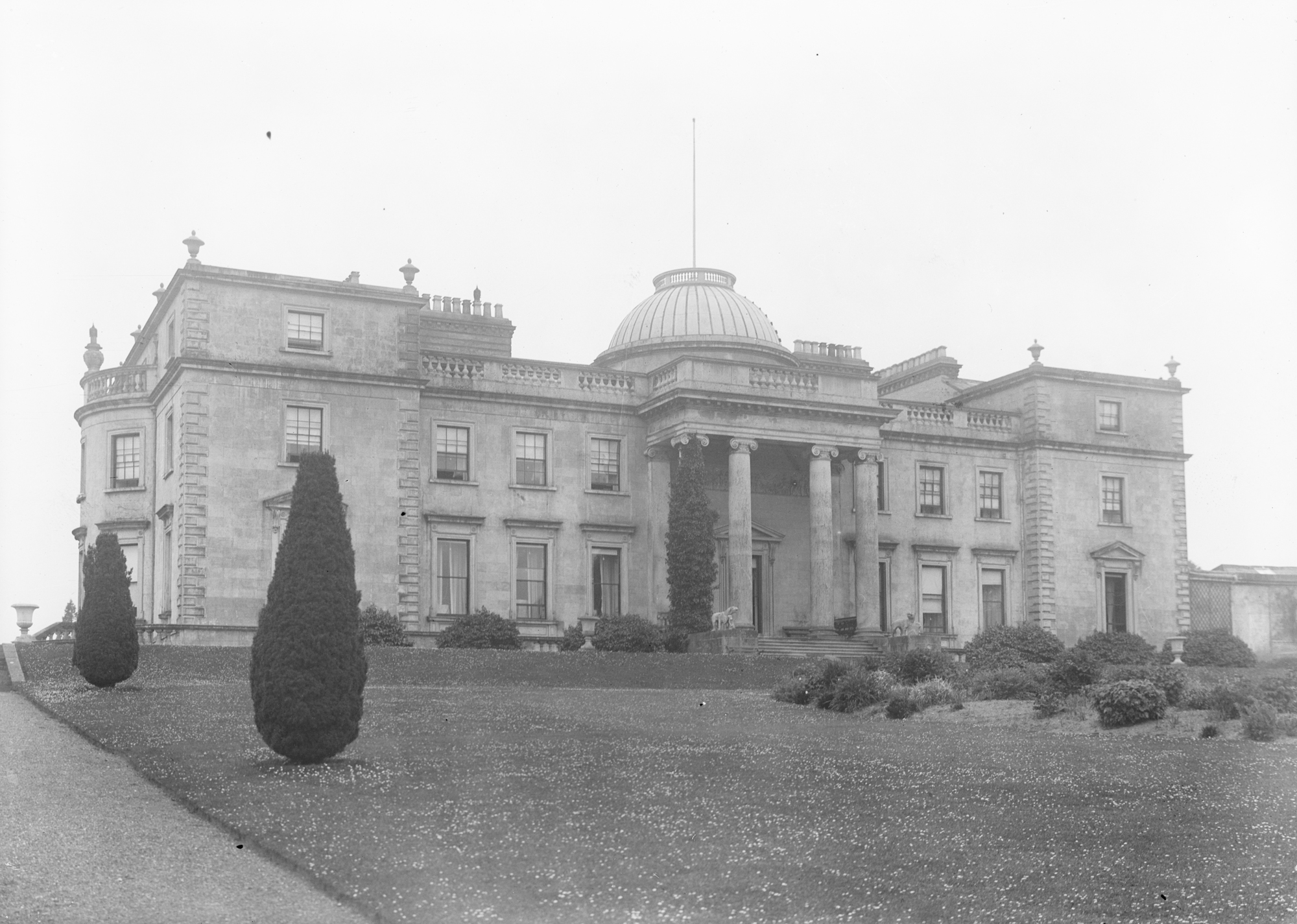
- Emo Court circa 1920
- Interactive map of the Emo Court area

General information
- Type: House
- Architectural style: Georgian
- Location: Emo, County Laois, Ireland, Ireland
- Coordinates: 53.107156°N 7.196906°W
- Construction started: 1790
- Estimated completion: 1796
- Owner: Office of Public Works

Design and construction
- Architect: James Gandon
- Developer: John Dawson, 1st Earl of Portarlington

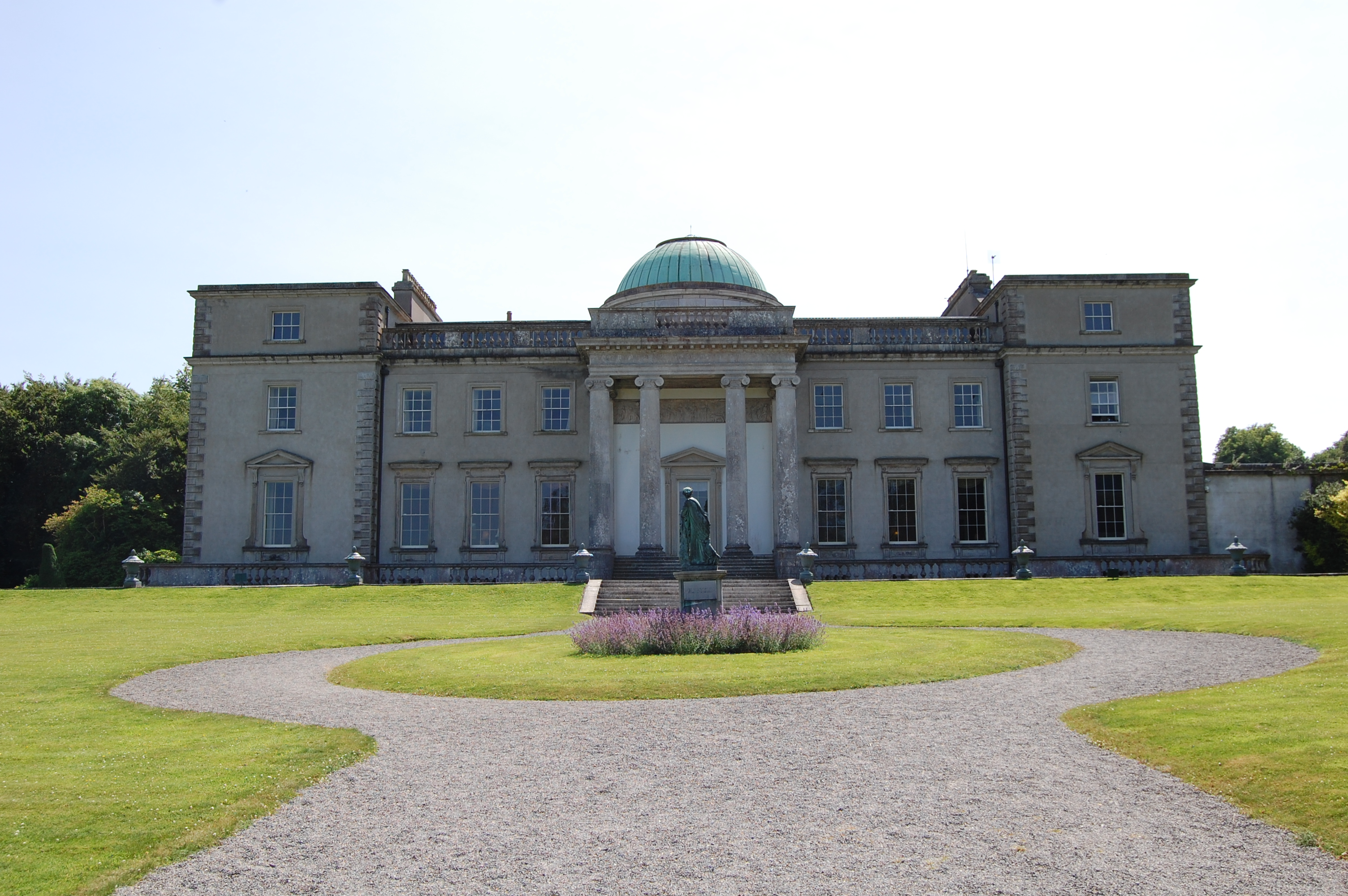
Emo Court, northern elevation

Emo Court, located near the village of Emo in County Laois, Ireland, is a large neo-classical mansion. Architectural features of the building include sash-style windows, pavilions, a balustrade, a hipped roof, and large dome.

It was designed by the architect James Gandon in 1790 for John Dawson, the first Earl of Portarlington. It is one of the few houses to have been designed by Gandon. Other buildings by Gandon include the Custom House and Kings Inns in Dublin.

While construction commenced in the 1790s, the first Earl died in 1798, and work was not completed until the tenure of the third Earl of Portarlington in the 1860s. Passing through several owners through the late nineteenth and early twentieth centuries, the house and gardens were taken into ownership by the Irish state in the 1990s. Now managed by the Office of Public Works, the estate is open to visitors.

== History ==
=== Eighteenth and nineteenth century construction ===
When John Dawson, 1st Earl of Portarlington died in 1798, his new house was under construction but far from finished. The second Earl, also John Dawson, employed new architects to continue the work. The building became habitable during his lifetime.

At his death 47 years later, the main building was still unfinished, and in the aftermath of the Great Famine (1845–1852), came near to being sold. By the 1860s, the third earl, Henry Dawson-Damer succeeded in bringing Emo Court to a state closely resembling that which stands today. Some elements of the basic structure are faithful to the original plans of James Gandon. However, while Gandon was involved in the first twenty years of its building, given how long the building was in development, little more than his name can be connected with the house which finally came into being.

At some time between 1884 and 1902, the London firm Merryweather & Sons installed a water supply system at Emo. Intended for domestic needs and potential fire fighting, an illustration of the arrangements, involving a 'Hatfield' pump, appeared in Merryweather's adverts. In the same project, Merryweather installed a Safety Electric Lighting system.

=== Early twentieth century decline ===
Emo Court was in its heyday in the final forty years of the nineteenth century. However, after the outbreak of World War I in 1914, and, two years later, the Easter Rising and subsequent War of Independence, the Earls of Portarlington, like many Protestants and most of the Anglo-Irish nobility and gentry, left what would become the Irish Free State permanently, and the house was shut up. In 1920, the estate, which extended over nearly 20 square miles (52 km^{2}), was sold to the Irish Land Commission. The house remained unoccupied, while most of the land was distributed to local farmers.

=== Jesuits at Emo ===
In 1930 the house was acquired by the Jesuits, with the house and 280 acres purchased for £2000.

The deeds were signed on 19 February 1930, and Emo Court became known as St Mary's, Emo. The house was opened as the Novitiate of the Irish Province on 4 August 1930, and novices transferred from St Stanislaus' College, Tullamore. There were 52 novices that year. One of the first Jesuit priests to live there was noted photographer Father Francis Browne. As landlords, the Jesuits turned the grounds into a productive farm and orchard and used part of them for playing fields. Some major changes were made in the interior, to provide a chapel and assembly room.

In the 1960s, it became apparent that St Mary's Emo was too isolated for the more modern ideas about training novices for work with the Society. In the late 1960s, the number of Novices had diminished, so that in the final years at St Mary's Emo, there were 15 Novices remaining. This meant that it was expensive to run the house for so few men, even with visitors coming to stay for various reasons. Over 500 young men had begun their lives as Jesuits at Emo. In September 1969, the Jesuits left Emo for Manresa House, Dollymount, North Dublin.

=== Major Cholmeley Harrison to present ===
A new chapter began for Emo Court when the Jesuits sold the property to Major Cholmeley Harrison in 1969. Cholmeley Harrison commissioned the London architect Sir Albert Richardson, a leading authority on Georgian architecture, to take on the restoration of the house.

While the house remained a private residence, the public were encouraged to enjoy the gardens every Sunday for a fee.

The final phase began in 1994 when Cholmeley Harrison presented Emo Court to the President of Ireland, Mary Robinson, who received it on behalf of the people of Ireland. Cholmeley Harrison continued to live there in private apartments until his death, aged 99 in July 2008. Staff of the Office of Public Works (OPW) now care for the estate.

== House and gardens ==
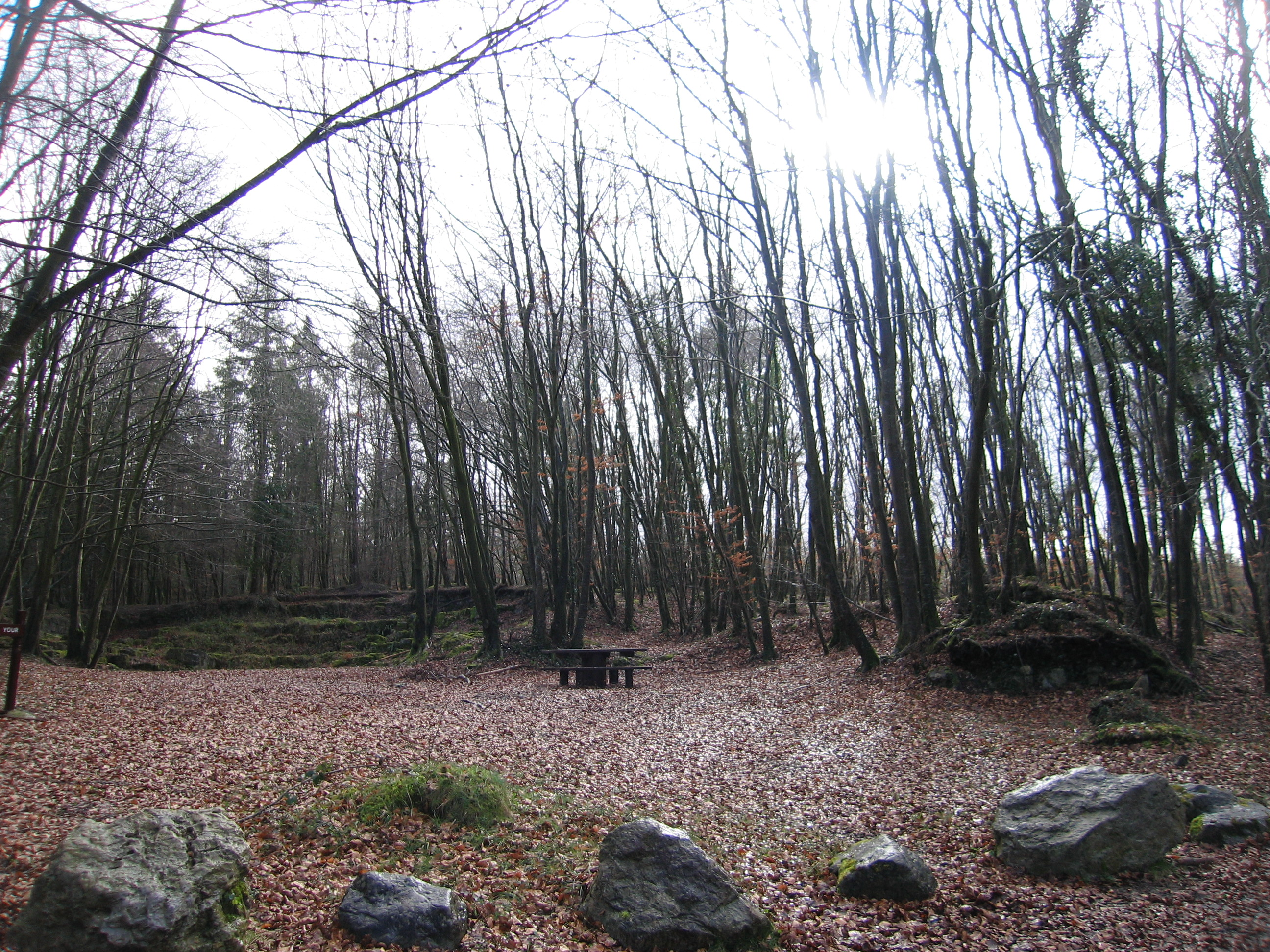
Beech wood in Emo Court

The approach to Emo Court is through a gateway, and along a driveway which runs for some distance through a beech wood before opening up to an avenue lined by giant sequoias. These large trees were first introduced in 1853 and named Wellingtonias in honour of Arthur Wellesley, 1st Duke of Wellington, who died the previous year. There is a visitor car park to the side of the house. To the left are coach houses and servants' quarters, to the right mature trees and in the centre the entrance front, dominated by a pediment supported by four Ionic pillars. The Earl's coat of arms fills the pediment and, to left and right, are eighteenth-century friezes depicting agriculture and the arts.

Inside the house, an octagonal entrance hall has doors in each of its four angles. Two of them really are entrances to other rooms. The others to give a balanced effect. A larger doorway leads to the rotunda (inspired by the Pantheon), a key feature of the mansion and also the way into two of the major rooms and out to the garden. Completed about 1860 by the Dublin architect William Caldbeck, it is two storeys high, surmounted by a dome which extends above the roof line of the rest of the house. Pilasters of Siena marble support the ornate ceiling.

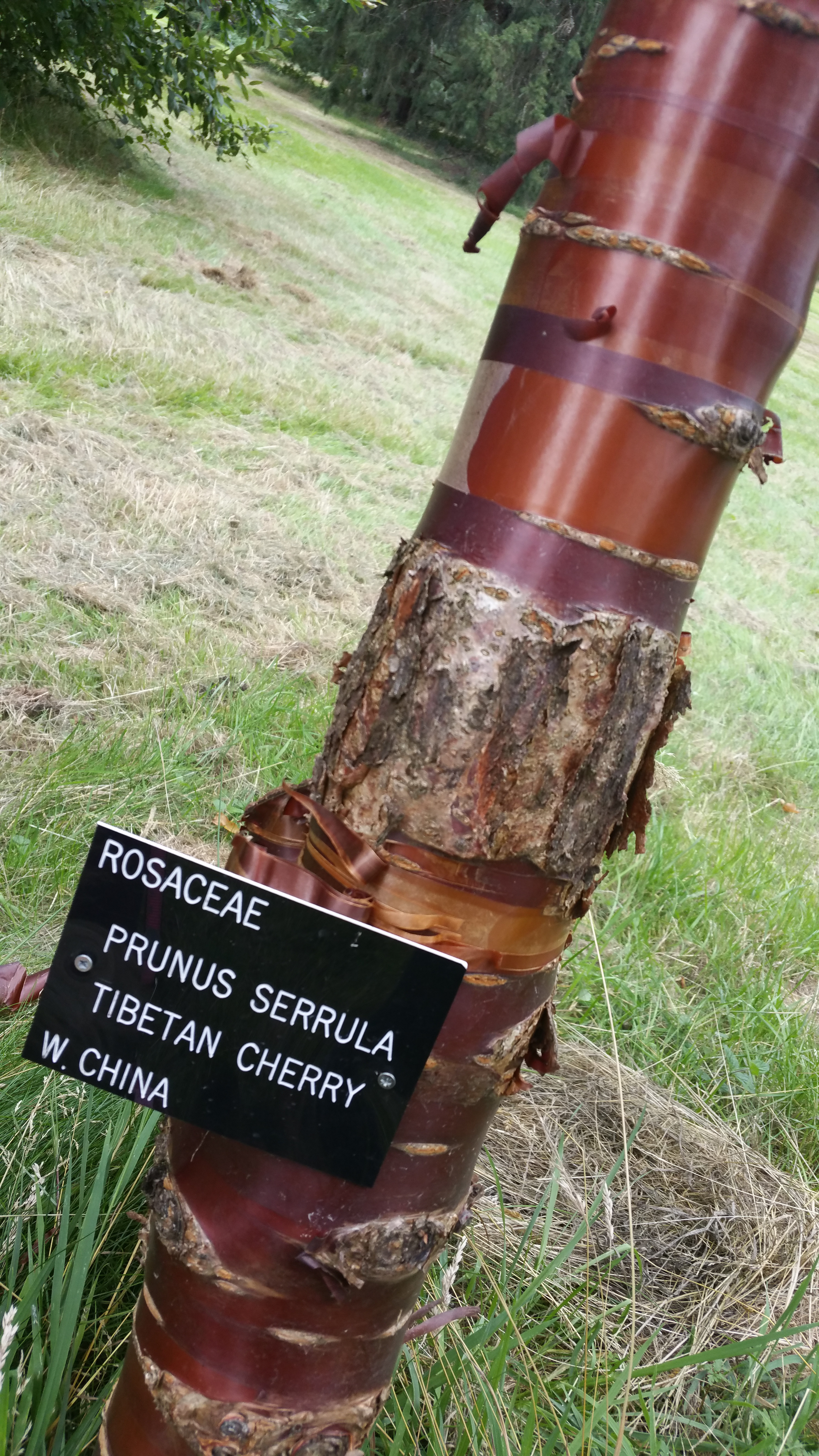
Close up of a Tibetan cherry tree in Emo Court Gardens

The gardens at Emo are 35 hectares of landscaped grounds, with formal areas, woodland walks, statues and a 20-acre lake – a feature of neoclassical landscape design. Many of the original statues were found in the waters of the lake and it is suspected they found their way there during the time the Jesuits were living in the property, who wanted to hide pagan nudity of figures, where they survived until their eventual discovery and restoration. The gardens are divided into two main areas. The Clucker (from the Irish: An Clochar, the convent), which contains some rare specimen trees and glades of azaleas, rhododendrons, camellias and other shrubs. The Grapery is an arboretum though which wind a series of pathways, several opening to views of the surrounding Slieve Bloom Mountains or towards the house.

== See also ==
- List of Jesuit sites
