= Archibald Kennedy, 2nd Marquess of Ailsa =

Scottish peer (1816-1870)

The Most Honourable The Marquess of Ailsa KT DL
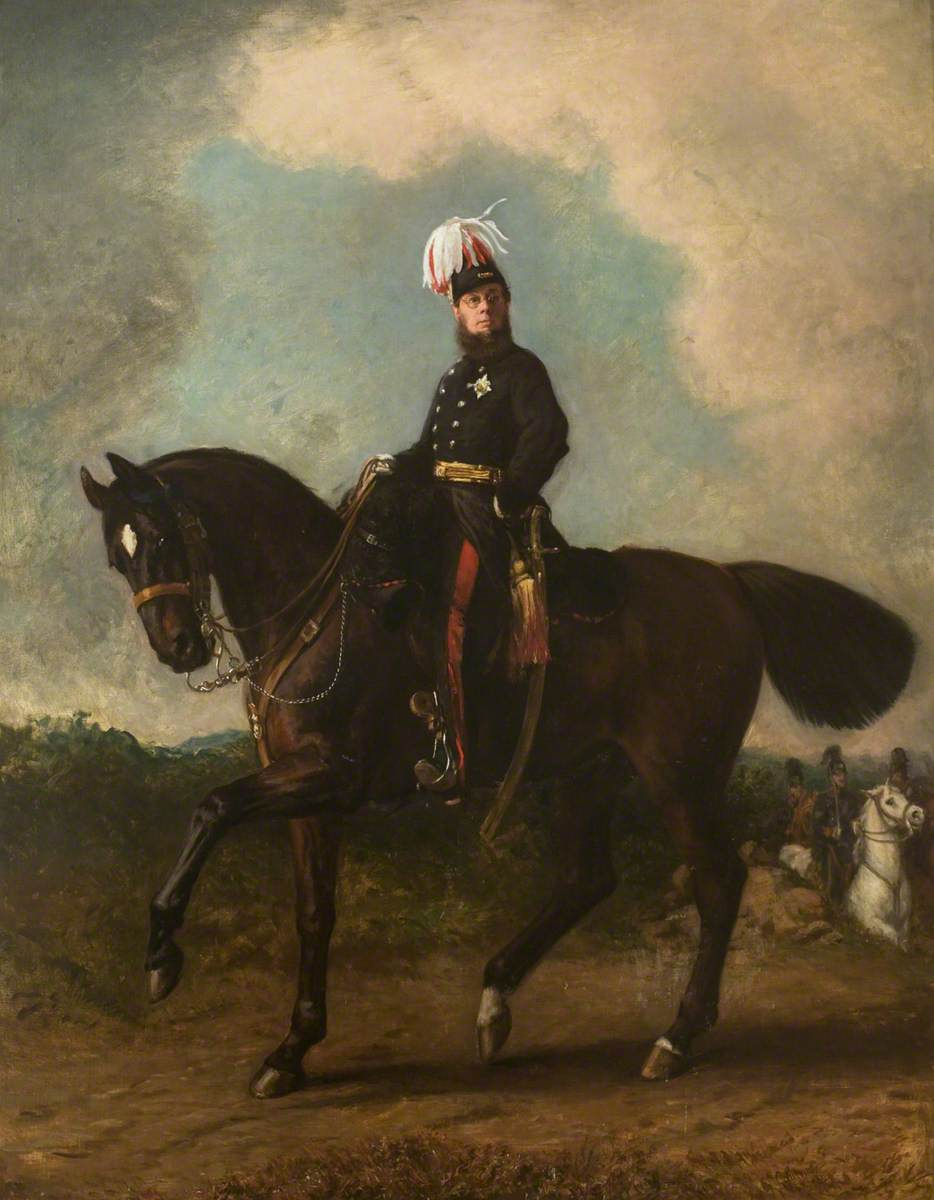
- Equestrian portrait by Charles Lutyens (1863–64)

Lord Lieutenant of Ayrshire
- In office 1861–1870
- Preceded by: The Earl of Eglinton
- Succeeded by: The Earl of Stair

Personal details
- Born: Archibald Kennedy; 25 August 1816 Dunottar, Scotland
- Died: 20 March 1870 (aged 53)
- Spouse: Julia Jephson (m. 1846)
- Children: 6
- Parents: Archibald Kennedy, Earl of Cassillis (father); Eleanor Allardyce (mother)
- Relatives: Archibald Kennedy, 1st Marquess of Ailsa (paternal grandfather); Alexander Allardyce (great-grandfather); Sir Richard Jephson, 1st Baronet (father-in-law); Archibald Kennedy, 3rd Marquess of Ailsa (son)

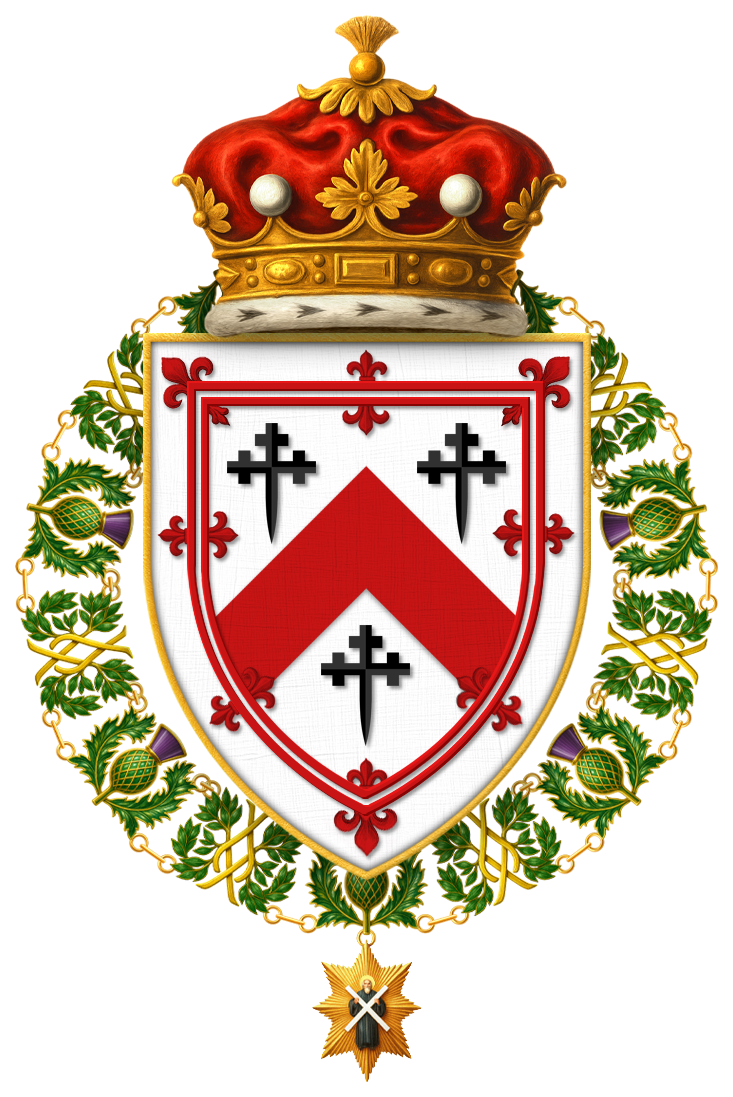
Shield of Arms of Archibald Kennedy, 2nd Marquess of Ailsa, KT, FRS

Archibald Kennedy, 2nd Marquess of Ailsa, KT DL (25 August 1816 – 20 March 1870) was a Scottish peer and soldier.

== Early life ==
Born at Dunottar, he was the eldest son of eleven children of Archibald Kennedy, Earl of Cassilis, MP for Evesham, and Eleanor Allardyce, a daughter of Alexander Allardyce.

Among his extended family was aunt Lady Anne Kennedy (wife of Sir David Baird, 2nd Baronet), Lady Mary Kennedy (wife of Richard Oswald, son of Richard Alexander Oswald), Lady Margaret Kennedy (wife of Thomas Radclyffe-Livingstone-Eyre), Hon. John Kennedy-Erskine of Dun (who married Lady Augusta FitzClarence, an illegitimate daughter of King William IV), and Lady Alicia Jane Kennedy (who married Jonathan Peel, Secretary of State for War).

== Career ==
As his father predeceased his grandfather, the 1st Marquess of Ailsa, in 1832, Kennedy succeeded to his grandfather's titles in 1846. Eleanor as Marchioness was involved with Catharine Tait's Ladies Diocesan Association visiting the poor in the City Road Workhouse.

Kennedy served in the British Army as a lieutenant in the 17th Lancers (Duke of Cambridge's Own). Having been previously a Deputy Lieutenant, he was appointed Lord Lieutenant of Ayrshire in 1861, an office he held until his death in a hunting accident nine years later.

== Marriage and issue ==
On 10 November 1846, Ailsa married Julia Jephson, daughter of Sir Richard Jephson, 1st Baronet, and had by her three sons and three daughters:

- Archibald Kennedy, 3rd Marquess of Ailsa (1847–1938), who succeeded his father.
- Lady Julia Alice Kennedy (1849–1936), who married Col. Robert William Web Follett in 1869.
- Lady Evelyn Anne Kennedy (1851–1936), who married Capt. Sir Arthur Henderson Young, 17th Governor of the Straits Settlements.
- Lt.-Col. Lord Alexander Kennedy (1853–1912), who married Beatrice Gordon, daughter of George Tomline Gordon.
- Lady Constance Eleanor Kennedy (1855–1946), who married Col. Lionel Grimston Fawkes.
- Lt. Lord John Kennedy (1859–1895), who married Adelaide Mary Learmonth, daughter of Alexander Learmonth MP for Colchester.

On 4 March 1870, Ailsa suffered fatal head injuries after being thrown from his horse while fox hunting near Craigie, Ayrshire. He was taken to George Hotel, Kilmarnock, where reports indicated a slow progress towards recovery. His wife and daughter Lady Evelyn accompanied him back to the family residence, Culzean Castle, where his condition worsened. He died 16 days after the accident at Culzean.

Honorary titles
Preceded by The Earl of Eglinton	Lord Lieutenant of Ayrshire; 1861 – 1870	Succeeded by The Earl of Stair
Peerage of the United Kingdom
Preceded by Archibald Kennedy	Marquess of Ailsa; 1846 – 1870	Succeeded by Angus Kennedy
