= Fergus Bowes-Lyon =

British army officer (1889–1915)

Captain The Honourable Fergus Bowes-Lyon
- Born: 18 April 1889; Ham, Surrey, England
- Died: 27 September 1915 (aged 26); Loos-en-Gohelle, France
- Burial place: Quarry Cemetery, Vermelles, France
- Spouse: Christian Norah Dawson-Damer (m. 1914)
- Children: 1
- Parents: Claude Bowes-Lyon, 14th Earl of Strathmore and Kinghorne (father); Cecilia Cavendish-Bentinck (mother)
- Military career
- Allegiance: United Kingdom
- Branch: British Army
- Service years: 1914–1915
- Rank: Captain
- Conflicts: World War I: Battle of Loos †

Fergus Bowes-Lyon (18 April 1889 – 27 September 1915) was a British officer and elder brother of Elizabeth Bowes-Lyon (later the queen consort of King George VI). He was killed during World War I. He was a maternal uncle of Queen Elizabeth II.

== Early life and marriage ==
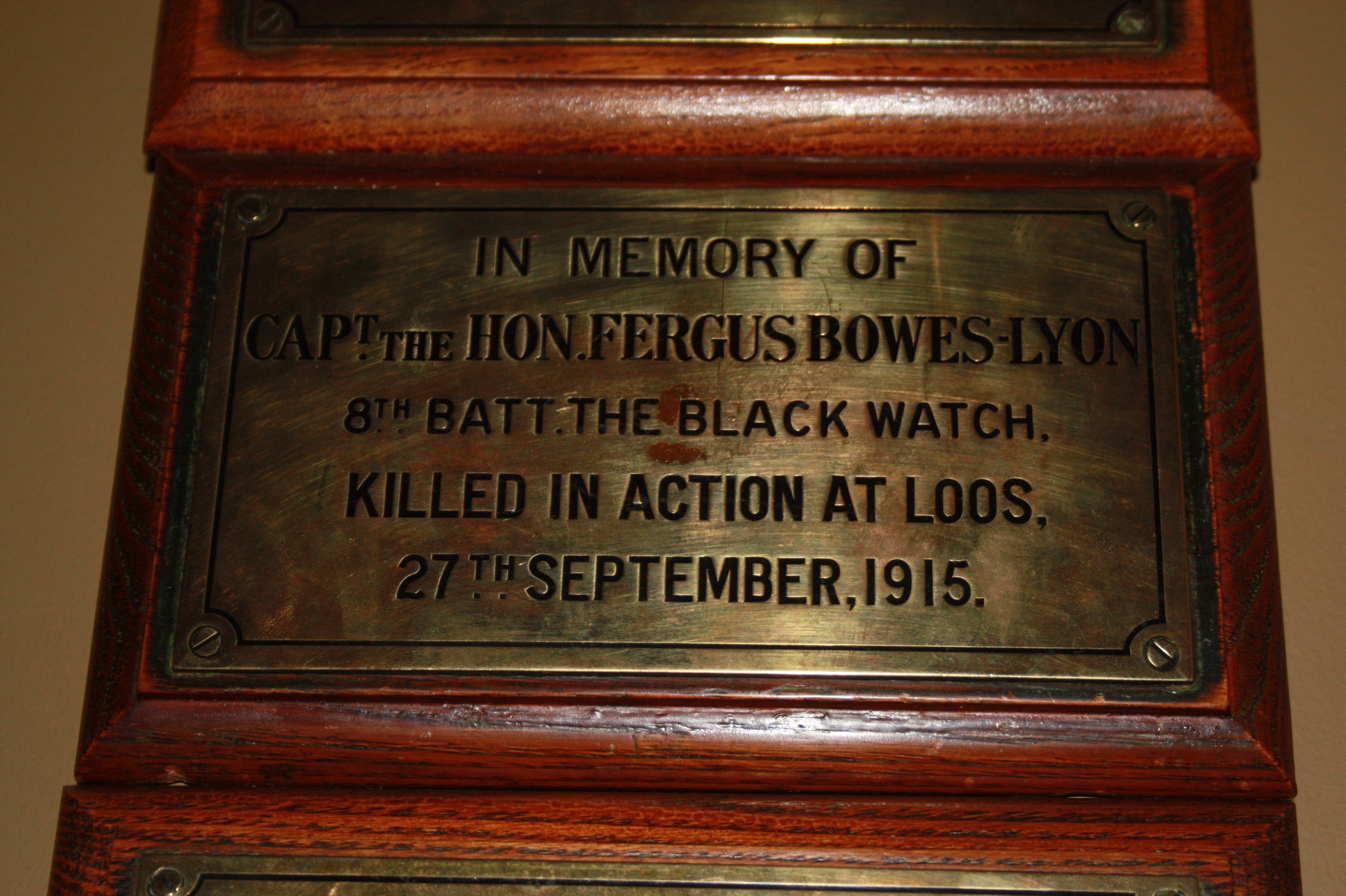
Memorial plaque to Bowes-Lyon, Black Watch Museum, Perth

Fergus Bowes-Lyon was born on 18 April 1889 at Forbes House in Ham, Surrey, the son of Claude Bowes-Lyon, 14th Earl of Strathmore and Kinghorne, and Cecilia Cavendish-Bentinck.

Bowes-Lyon was educated at Ludgrove School and later attended Eton College. He was a keen cricketer and played in the annual autumn fixtures held at the cricket ground at Glamis Castle.

On 17 September 1914, Bowes-Lyon married Lady Christian Norah Dawson-Damer (7 August 1890 – 29 March 1959), daughter of the 5th Earl of Portarlington. They had one daughter, Rosemary, who was born the following year.

== World War I ==
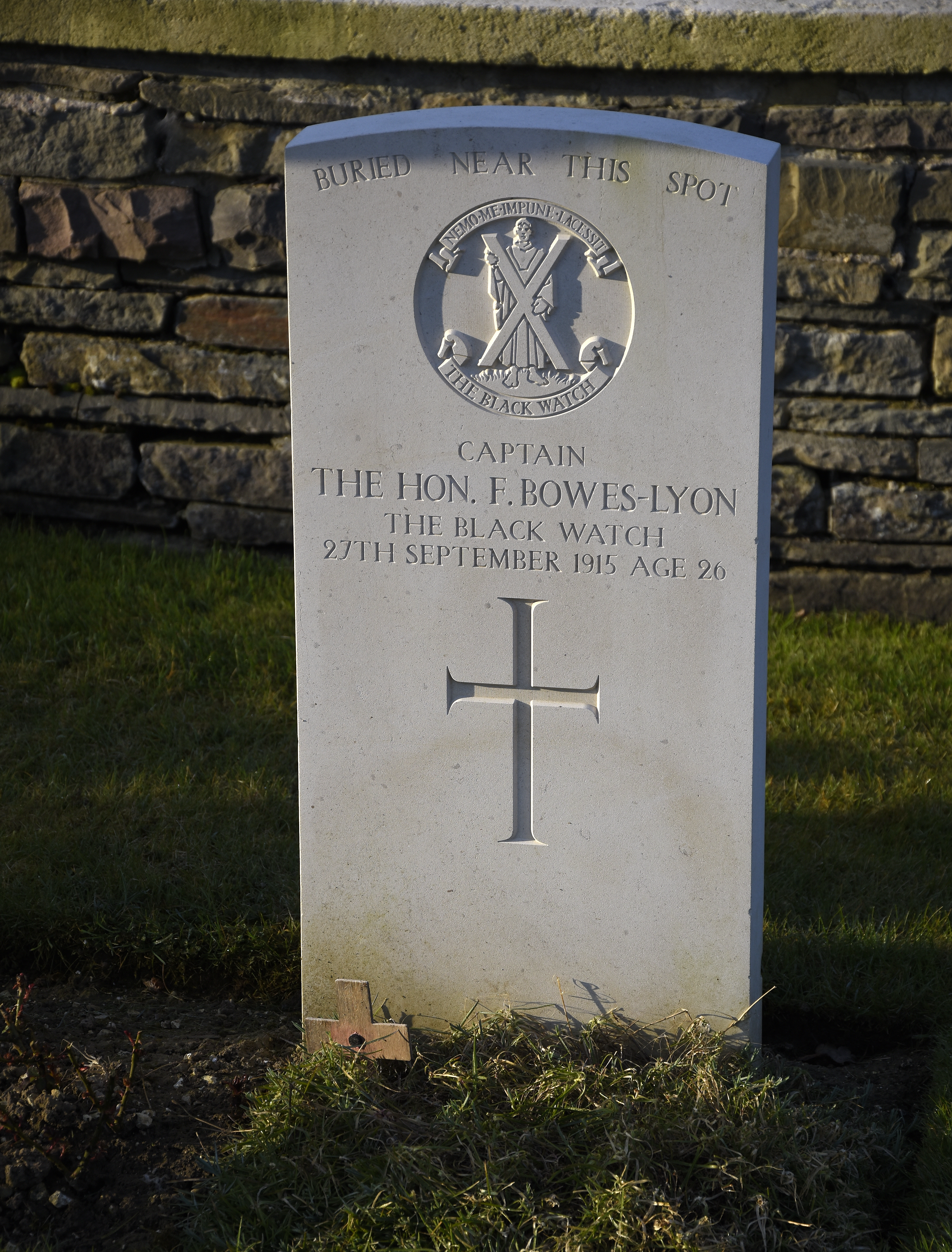
Grave of Bowes-Lyon at the Quarry Cemetery in Vermelles

In the First World War, Bowes-Lyon served with the 8th Battalion, Black Watch, becoming a lieutenant on 19 August 1914 and a temporary captain on 17 November. Alfred Anderson, later the last surviving Scottish soldier of the conflict (and the last surviving British soldier to have been awarded the 1914 Star), was his batman.

Bowes-Lyon was killed in action on 27 September 1915, during the Battle of the Hohenzollern Redoubt in the Battle of Loos. As he led an attack on the German lines, his leg was blown off by a barrage of German artillery and he fell back into his sergeant's arms. Bullets struck him in the chest and shoulder and he died on the field. He was buried in a quarry at Vermelles, but although the quarry was adopted as a war cemetery, the location of his grave was lost, and he was recorded among the missing on the Loos Memorial.

At the time of Bowes-Lyon's death, his brother John was also serving with the Black Watch. His younger brother, Michael, was at home recovering from wounds, and his eldest brother, Lord Glamis, had recently left the Black Watch after being wounded. His mother was severely affected by his death and became an invalid, withdrawing from public life until the marriage of her daughter Elizabeth to the future king George VI in 1923. Fergus's widow later married Captain William Frederick Martin (d. 6 October 1947). She died on 29 March 1959, aged 68.

In November 2011, Bowes-Lyon's grandson supplied family records to the Commonwealth War Graves Commission detailing his original burial place and showing that it had remained marked until the end of the war. As a result, in August 2012, his place of commemoration was moved to the Quarry Cemetery, Auchy-les-Mines, where a headstone was erected bearing his details and the words "Buried near this spot", as the precise location of his grave remains unknown.

== Ancestry ==
Ancestors of Fergus Bowes-Lyon

8. Thomas George Lyon-Bowes, Lord Glamis
4. Claude Bowes-Lyon, 13th Earl of Strathmore and Kinghorne
9. Charlotte Grimstead
2. Claude Bowes-Lyon, 14th Earl of Strathmore and Kinghorne
10. Oswald Smith
5. Frances Dora Smith
11. Henrietta Mildred Hodgson
1. Fergus Bowes-Lyon
12. Lord Charles Bentinck
6. Charles William Frederick Cavendish-Bentinck
13. Anne Wellesley
3. Cecilia Cavendish-Bentinck
14. Edwyn Burnaby
7. Caroline Louisa Burnaby
15. Anne Caroline Salisbury
