= Archibald Kennedy, 1st Marquess of Ailsa =

Scottish nobleman

The Most Honourable The Marquess of Ailsa KT, FRS
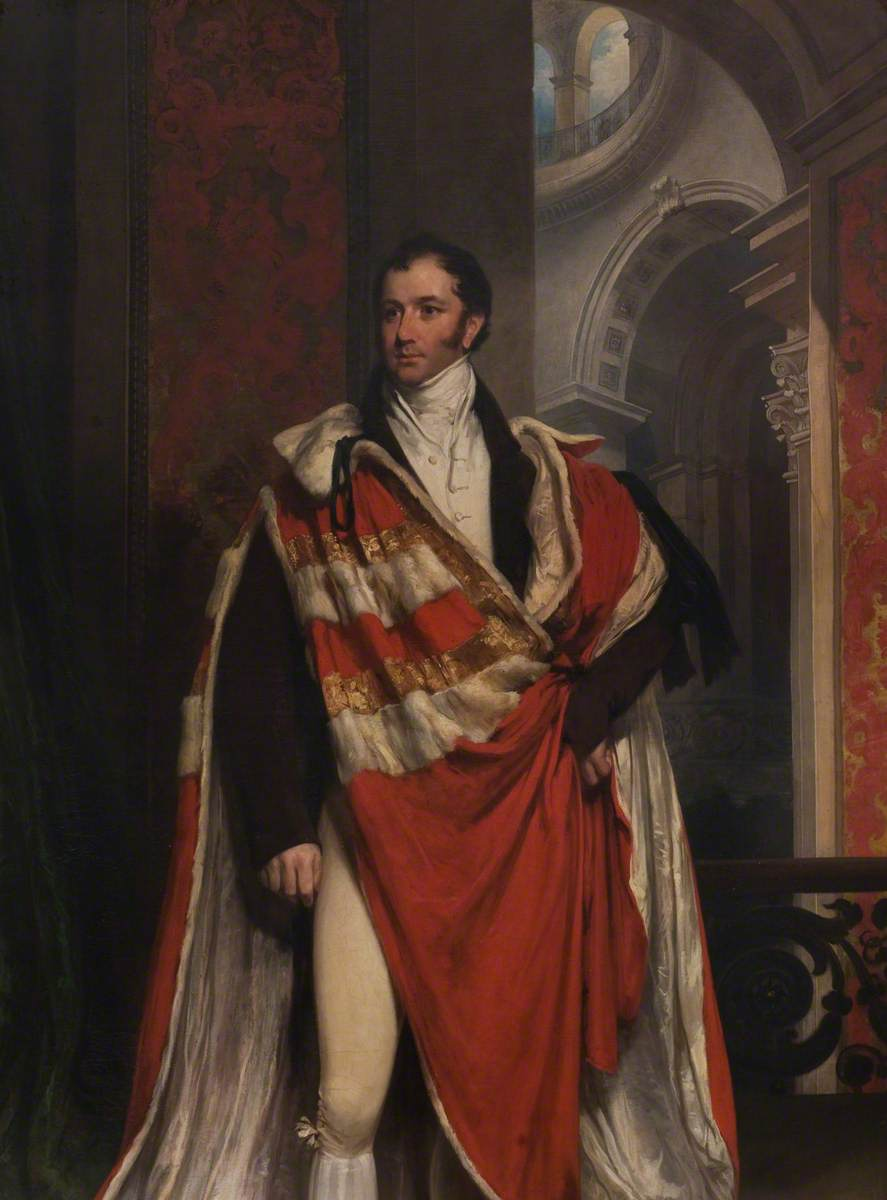
- Portrait of Lord Ailsa, by William Owen, 1816

Scottish representative peer
- In office 1796–1806

Personal details
- Born: Archibald Kennedy; February 1770
- Died: 8 September 1846 (aged 76)
- Spouse: Margaret Erskine (1793–1846)
- Children: 6, including Archibald, Margaret, John
- Parent(s): Archibald Kennedy, 11th Earl of Cassilis; Anne Watts

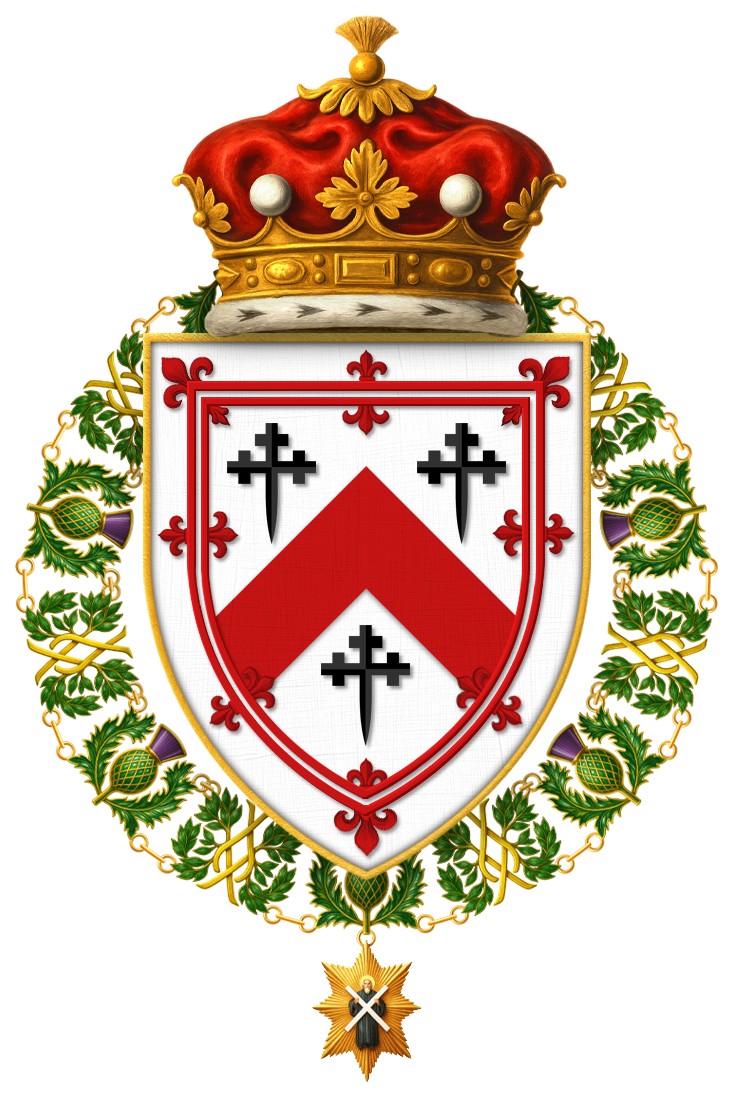
Shield of Arms of Archibald Kennedy, 1st Marquess of Ailsa, KT, FRS

Archibald Kennedy, 1st Marquess of Ailsa, KT, FRS (February 1770 – 8 September 1846), styled Lord Kennedy between 1792–4 and known as the Earl of Cassillis between 1794 and 1831, was a Scottish peer.

== Early life ==
Kennedy was the eldest son of Archibald Kennedy, 11th Earl of Cassillis, a Scottish peer who lived in the English Colony of New York, and, his second wife, Anne Watts. Among his siblings were the Hon. John Kennedy (who married Charlotte Gill), Hon. Robert Kennedy (who married Jane Macomb, a daughter of merchant Alexander Macomb) and Lady Anne Kennedy (who married William Henry Digby). Before his parents' marriage, his father was married to, and widowed from, Katherine Schuyler (a daughter of Peter Schuyler and granddaughter of Arent Schuyler). Katherine was an only child, so she inherited all of her father's estate upon his death in 1762 and Kennedy inherited the entire estate after her death in 1765.

His paternal grandparents were Archibald Kennedy (a direct descendant of the second son of the 3rd Earl of Cassilis) and Maria (née Walter) Kennedy. His maternal grandparents were John Watts and Ann (née DeLancey) Watts (a granddaughter of Stephen Delancey). His uncle was U.S. Representative John Watts, who had served as the Speaker of the New York State Assembly.

He became known by the courtesy title Lord Kennedy when his father succeeded to the earldom of Cassillis in 1792.

== Career ==
Kennedy succeeded to the earldom on the death of his father 30 December 1794. He sat in the House of Lords as a Scottish representative peer between 1796 and 1806. In the latter year, he was created Baron Ailsa, of Ailsa in the County of Ayr, in the Peerage of the United Kingdom, which entitled him to an automatic seat in the House of Lords. He was admitted a Fellow of the Royal Society on 18 February 1819. In 1831 he was created Marquess of Ailsa, of the Isle of Ailsa in the County of Ayr. He voted for the Reform Bill in 1832. In 1820, King George IV made Archibald a knight of the Order of the Thistle. This was an achievement that Sir Archibald had coveted for some time.

He had a taste for gambling. He owned racehorses and raced many that won cups in 1801 and 1802. He owned Clementina, Scaramouche, Pegasus, Chancellor, and Trimmer. He and 13 others established the Ayr Gold Cup held annually with only Scottish-trained horses that raced over a two-mile (3.2-kilometre) run.

== Personal life ==
On 1 June 1793, Lord Ailsa married Margaret Erskine (1772–1848), the second daughter of Mary (née Baird) Erskine and John Erskine of Dun, Forfarshire. Together, they had six children:

- Archibald Kennedy, Earl of Cassillis (1794–1832), who predeceased his father; he married Eleanor Allardyce and had issue, including Archibald Kennedy, 2nd Marquess of Ailsa.
- Lady Anne Kennedy (1797–1877), who married Sir David Baird of Newbyth, 2nd Baronet and had issue.
- Lady Mary Kennedy (1799–1886), who married Richard Oswald, son of Richard Alexander Oswald, MP for Ayr of Auchincruive Estate.
- Lady Margaret Kennedy (1800–1889), who married Thomas Radclyffe-Livingstone-Eyre.
- The Hon. John Kennedy-Erskine of Dun (1802–1831), who assumed the additional name of Erskine after inheriting the Dun estate from his aunt in 1824; married in 1827 Lady Augusta FitzClarence, an illegitimate daughter of King William IV and Dorothy Jordan.
- Lady Alicia Jane Kennedy (1805–1887), who married Jonathan Peel, Secretary of State for War.

Lord Ailsa died in 1846 and was succeeded by his grandson Archibald Kennedy.

=== Legacy ===
Lord Ailsa bought a house and large grounds straddling Twickenham and Isleworth in Middlesex, but a few yards from a relatively new Thames crossing, Richmond Bridge and the fashionable town and day resort from London, Richmond. It had last belonged to the playwright Richard Brinsley Sheridan. He named it "St Margaret's" and the name of the house has now been applied to Twickenham Park too, see Twickenham Meadows, its forebear. Ailsa Road and Ailsa Avenue in the area are also named after him.

Peerage of Scotland
Preceded by Archibald Kennedy	Earl of Cassilis; 1794–1846	Succeeded by Archibald Kennedy
Peerage of the United Kingdom
New creation	Marquess of Ailsa; 1831–1846	Succeeded by Archibald Kennedy
New creation	Baron Ailsa; 1806–1846	Succeeded by Archibald Kennedy
