= Archibald Kennedy, Earl of Cassilis =

Scottish aristocrat and Member of Parliament

The Right Honourable The Earl of Cassillis

Member of Parliament for Evesham
- In office 1830–1831 Serving with Sir Charles Cockerell
- Preceded by: Sir Charles Cockerell; Edward Davis Protheroe
- Succeeded by: Sir Charles Cockerell; Thomas Hudson

Personal details
- Born: 4 June 1794
- Died: 12 August 1832 (aged 38)
- Spouse: Eleanor Allardyce (m. 1814; died 1832)
- Relations: Archibald Kennedy, 11th Earl of Cassilis (grandfather); Margaret Radclyffe Livingstone Eyre (sister)
- Children: 11
- Parent(s): Archibald Kennedy, 1st Marquess of Ailsa; Margaret Erskine
- Education: University of Saint Andrews

Archibald Kennedy IV, Earl of Cassillis (4 June 1794 – 12 August 1832), styled Lord Kennedy until 1831, was a Scottish aristocrat and Member of Parliament. He was the eldest son and heir of Archibald Kennedy, 1st Marquess of Ailsa but died before his father.

== Early life ==
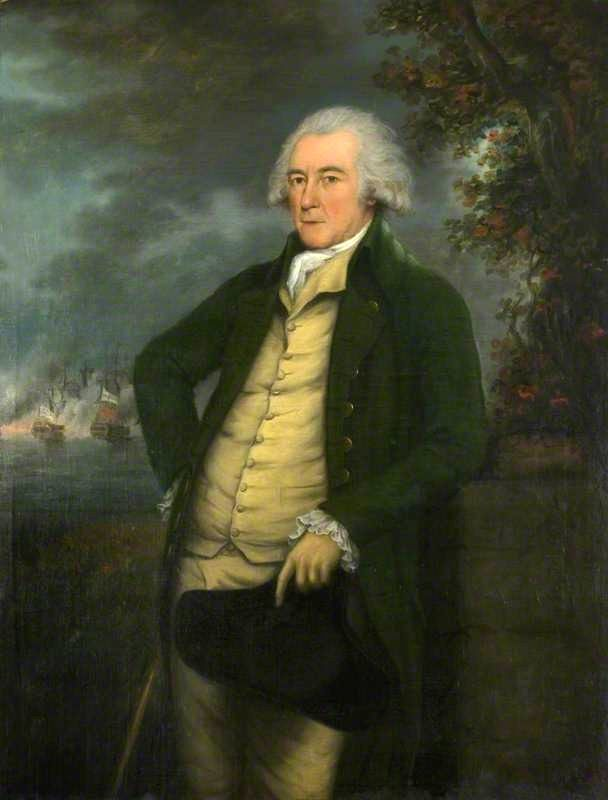
Portrait of his grandfather, the 11th Earl of Cassilis by Mather Brown

Archibald was the eldest son of Archibald Kennedy, 1st Marquess of Ailsa and the former Margaret Erskine. Among his younger siblings were Lady Anne Kennedy (wife of Sir David Baird, 2nd Baronet), Lady Margaret Radclyffe Livingstone Eyre, John Kennedy-Erskine (who married Lady Augusta FitzClarence, an illegitimate daughter of King William IV), and Lady Alicia Jane Kennedy (wife of Jonathan Peel, Secretary of State for War).

His father was the eldest son of Archibald Kennedy, 11th Earl of Cassillis, by Anne Watts (a daughter of John Watts and descendant of the Schuyler family, the Van Cortlandt family, and the Delancey family of British North America).

He studied at the University of Saint Andrews under the tutorage of James Ferrie, Professor of Civil History.

== Career ==
As the eldest son of his father, he became known by the courtesy title Lord Kennedy until 10 September 1831, when his father was elevated to the marquessate of Ailsa. From that point he was known as the Earl of Cassillis until his death (never succeeding to the marquessate).

Lord Cassillis served as a Member of Parliament for Evesham from 1830 to 1831.

== Marriage and issue ==
On 1 May 1814, Kennedy married Eleanor Allardyce, daughter and heiress of Alexander Allardyce of Dunnottar, Kincardine. Together, they had three daughters and nine sons, including:

- Lady Hannah Eleanor Kennedy (2 April 1815 – 8 May 1877), married Sir John Cathcart, 5th Baronet
- Archibald Kennedy, 2nd Marquess of Ailsa (1816–1870), married Julia Jephson, daughter of Sir Richard Jephson, 1st Baronet
- Hon. Alexander Kennedy (27 April 1818 – October 1832), died in childhood
- Hon. John Kennedy (3 September 1819 – 3 September 1846), died unmarried
- Lord David Kennedy (17 November 1820 – 10 April 1905), married in 1873 Lady Mary Emily Boyle, daughter of Charles Boyle, Viscount Dungarvan (son and heir of Edmund Boyle, 8th Earl of Cork) and Lady Catherine St Lawrence (daughter of the 2nd Earl of Howth)
- Lord Gilbert Kennedy (14 July 1822 – 25 November 1901), who married his cousin Margaret Baird, daughter of Sir David Baird, 2nd Baronet and Lady Anne Kennedy (daughter of Archibald Kennedy, 1st Marquess of Ailsa. They had two sons and two daughters.
- Capt. Lord William Kennedy (30 November 1823 – 5 March 1868), married Sarah Jane de Blois and had three children
- Lord Fergus Kennedy (18 February 1826 – 5 October 1852), died unmarried
- Lord Nigel Kennedy (25 May 1828 – 18 March 1878), married firstly in 1858 Catherine May (died 1862), with whom he had three children; and married secondly in 1866 Elizabeth Charlotte Neeld.
- Unnamed daughter (born and died 4 February 1831), died shortly after birth
- Lord Adolphus Archibald Kennedy (12 July 1832 – 20 June 1842), died in childhood

Lord Cassillis died on 12 August 1832, before he could succeed to the marquisate. His eldest son, Archibald, succeeded his grandfather as the 2nd Marquess of Ailsa on 8 September 1846. His widow died three months later.

Parliament of the United Kingdom
Preceded by Sir Charles Cockerell; Edward Davis Protheroe	Member of Parliament for Evesham; 1830–1831; With: Sir Charles Cockerell	Succeeded by Sir Charles Cockerell; Thomas Hudson
