= Henry Dawson-Damer, 3rd Earl of Portarlington =

Irish peer (1822–1889)

The Right Honourable The Earl of Portarlington KP
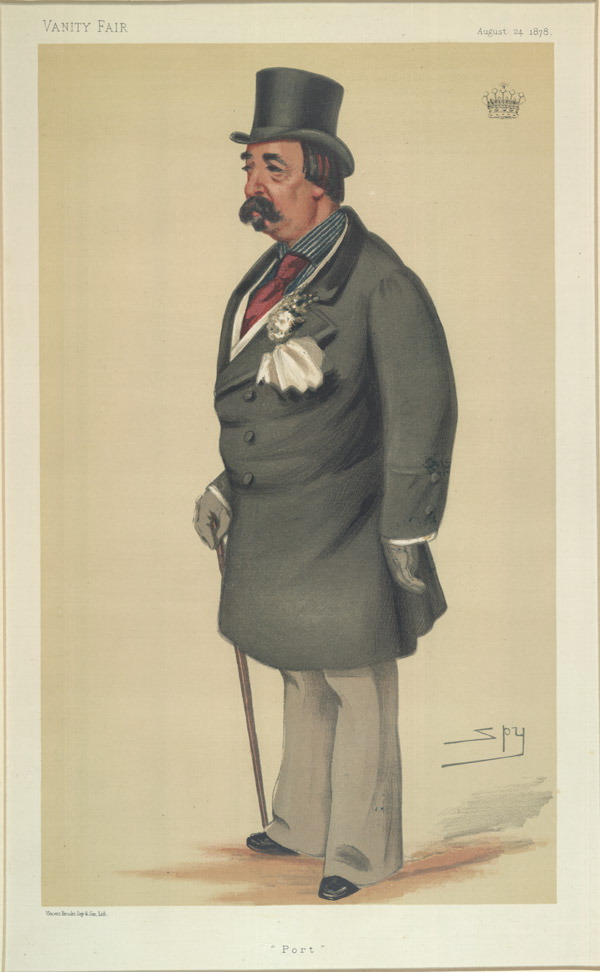
- "Port". Caricature by Spy published in Vanity Fair in 1878.
- Born: 5 September 1822
- Died: 1 March 1889 (aged 66)
- Spouse: Lady Alexandrina Vane (m. 1847; died 1874)
- Parents: Henry Dawson-Damer (father); Eliza Moriarty (mother)
- Relatives: John Dawson, 1st Earl (paternal grandfather); 1st Earl of Carhampton (maternal great-grandfather); John Dawson, 2nd Earl (uncle); Lionel Dawson-Damer, 4th Earl (cousin)
- Military career
- Allegiance: United Kingdom
- Branch: British Army
- Service years: 1841-1848
- Unit: Dorsetshire Yeomanry

Henry John Reuben Dawson-Damer, 3rd Earl of Portarlington KP (5 September 1822 – 1 March 1889) was an Irish peer.

== Early life ==
Henry was born on 5 September 1822 as the eldest son of Hon. Henry Dawson-Damer, a Captain in the Royal Navy, and the former Eliza Moriarty, who lived at Milton Abbey, Dorset.

His father was the second son of John Dawson, 1st Earl of Portarlington and Lady Caroline Stuart (a daughter of Prime Minister John Stuart, 3rd Earl of Bute). His maternal grandparents were Capt. Edmund Joshua Moriarty and Lady Lucy Luttrell (daughter of the 1st Earl of Carhampton).

== Career ==
On 17 November 1841, he was commissioned a cornet in the Dorsetshire Yeomanry.

He became Earl of Portarlington in 1845 on the death of his uncle John Dawson, 2nd Earl of Portarlington and resigned his Yeomanry commission in November 1848. The Earl was appointed a Knight of the Order of St Patrick on 8 February 1879.

== Personal life ==
He married Lady Alexandrina Octavia Maria Vane, second daughter of Charles Vane, 3rd Marquess of Londonderry.

Lord Portarlington died, without issue, on 1 March 1889 and was succeeded in the earldom by his cousin, Lionel.

Peerage of Ireland
Preceded by John Dawson	Earl of Portarlington; 1845–1889	Succeeded by Lionel Dawson-Damer
Political offices
Preceded by The Earl of Caledon	Representative peer for Ireland; 1855–1889	Succeeded by The Earl of Lucan
