= Earl of Portarlington =

Title in the peerage of Ireland

Earldom of Portarlington
- Arms: Quarterly: 1st & 4th, Barry nebuly of six Argent and Gules, over all a Bend engrailed Azure (for Damer); 2nd & 3rd, Azure, a Chevron Ermine, between three Arrows palewise points downwards Or, barbed and flighted proper, on a Chief Argent, three Martlets Sable, a Canton Gules, charged with a Mullet Or (for Dawson). Crests: 1st, Out of a Mural Crown Or, a Talbot’s Head Azure, eared Gold (for Damer); 2nd, A Cat’s Head affrontée erased near the shoulders, of a Tabby colour, holding in the mouth a Rat Sable (for Dawson). Supporters: On either side an Heraldic Tiger proper.
- Creation date: 21 June 1785
- Created by: Georges III
- Peerage: Peerage of Ireland
- First holder: John Dawson, 2nd Viscount Carlow
- Present holder: Charles Dawson-Damer, 8th Earl of Portarlington
- Heir apparent: Henry Dawson-Damer, Viscount Carlow
- Remainder to: The 1st Earl’s heirs male of the body lawfully begotten
- Subsidiary titles: Viscount Carlow; Baron Dawson
- Status: Extant
- Seat: Gledswood House
- Former seat: Emo Court
- Motto: VITÆ VIA VIRTUS (Virtue is the way of life)

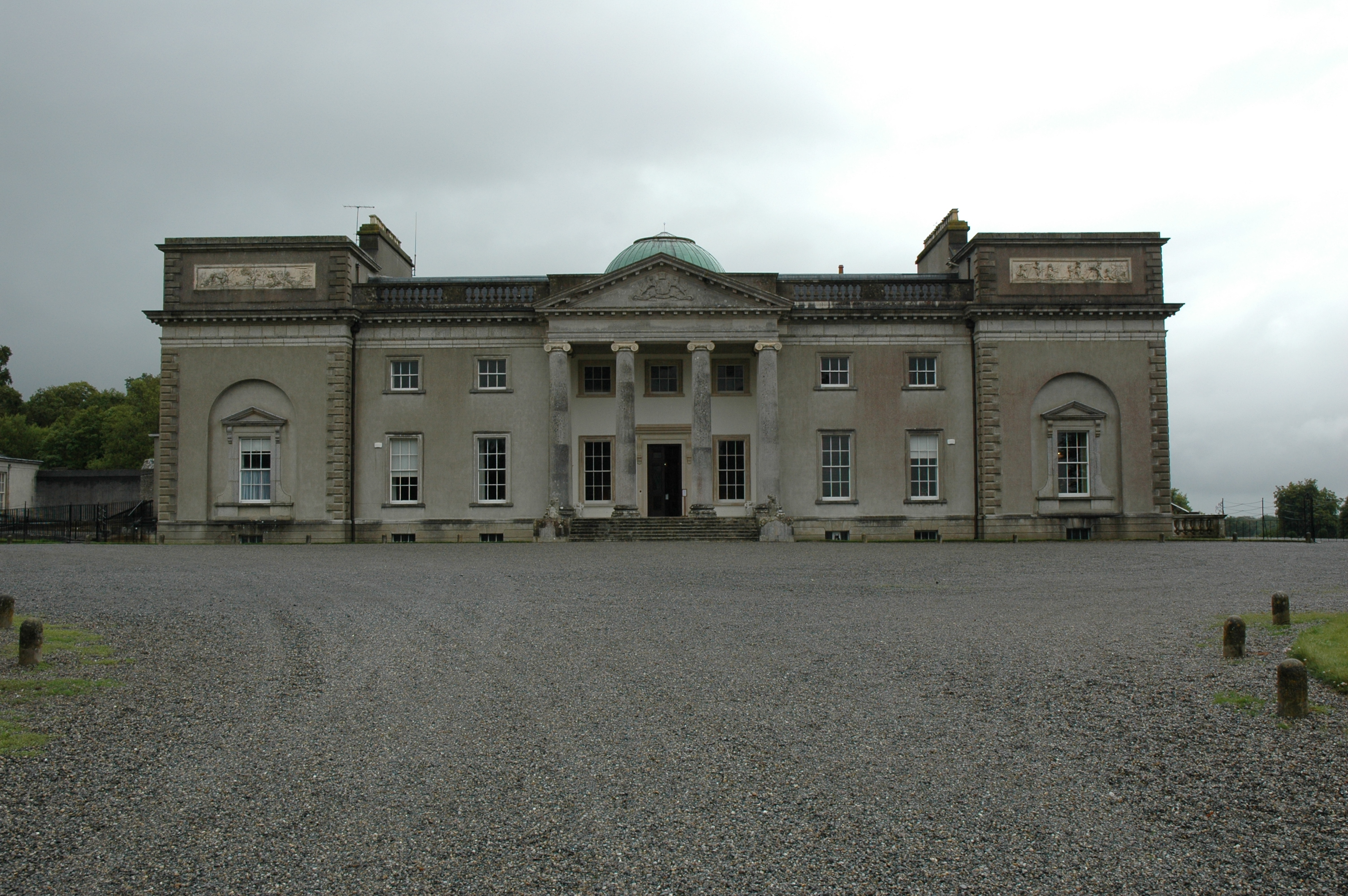
Emo Court, the former seat of the Earls of Portarlington.

Earl of Portarlington is a title in the Peerage of Ireland. It was created in 1785 for John Dawson, 2nd Viscount Carlow, who had earlier represented Portarlington in the Irish House of Commons. He was the son of William Dawson, 1st Viscount Carlow, who had represented Portarlington and Queen's County in the Irish House of Commons, and had been created Baron Dawson, of Dawson's Court in the Queen's County, in 1770, and Viscount Carlow, in the County of Carlow, in 1776. These titles were also in the Peerage of Ireland. The first Earl was succeeded by his eldest son, the second Earl. He was a Colonel in the 23rd Light Dragoons but disappeared the night before the Battle of Waterloo and thus missed the start of the battle. He then attached himself to the 18th Hussars, but after the battle was forced to resign his commission in disgrace, fell into dissipation and 'died in an obscure London slum'.

He never married and was succeeded by his nephew, the third Earl. He was the son of Captain the Hon. Henry Dawson, second son of the first Earl, who had assumed by Sign Manual the additional surname of Damer on inheriting the large Milton Abbey estate in Dorset from his aunt Lady Caroline Damer. Lord Portarlington sat in the House of Lords as an Irish representative peer from 1855 to 1889.

On his death the titles passed to his cousin, the fourth Earl. He was the son of Colonel the Hon. George Dawson-Damer, third son of the first Earl. Lord Portarlington represented Portarlington in the House of Commons as a Conservative. He was succeeded by his son, the fifth Earl. He was an Irish Representative Peer from 1896 to 1900. As of 2024 the titles are held by his great-great-grandson, the eighth Earl, who succeeded his father in 2024. He is the great grandson of George Lionel Seymour Dawson-Damer, Viscount Carlow, proprietor of the Corvinus Press, who was killed in action in 1944.

The family seat is Gledswood House, near Melrose, Roxburghshire. The former family seat was Emo Court, near Emo, County Laois.

== Viscounts Carlow (1776) ==
- William Henry Dawson, 1st Viscount Carlow (1712–1779)
- John Dawson, 2nd Viscount Carlow (1744–1798) (created Earl of Portarlington in 1785)

== Earls of Portarlington (1785) ==
- John Dawson, 1st Earl of Portarlington (1744–1798)
- John Dawson, 2nd Earl of Portarlington (1781–1845)
- Henry John Reuben Dawson-Damer, 3rd Earl of Portarlington (1822–1889)
- Lionel Seymour William Dawson-Damer, 4th Earl of Portarlington (1832–1892)
- George Lionel Henry Seymour Dawson-Damer, 5th Earl of Portarlington (1858–1900)
- Lionel Arthur Henry Seymour Dawson-Damer, 6th Earl of Portarlington (1883–1959)
  - George Lionel Seymour Dawson-Damer, Viscount Carlow (1907–1944)
- George Lionel Yuill Seymour Dawson-Damer, 7th Earl of Portarlington (1938–2024)
- Charles George Yuill Seymour Dawson-Damer, 8th Earl of Portarlington (born 1965)

== Previous peer ==
George Dawson-Damer, 7th Earl of Portarlington (10 August 1938 – 6 October 2024) was the elder son of Air Commodore George Lionel Seymour Dawson-Damer, Viscount Carlow, and his wife Peggy Cambie. He was educated at Eton College and was Page of Honour to Queen Elizabeth II between April 1953 and February 1955. In 1956 he was commissioned as a Second Lieutenant into the Irish Guards. On 4 July 1959 he succeeded to the peerages. In 1965 he was a director of G. S. Yuill and Company in Sydney, Australia.

On 26 July 1961 he married Davinia Windley, a daughter of Sir Edward Henry Windley and Patience Ann Sergison-Brooke, and they had four children:

- Charles George Yuill Seymour Dawson-Damer, 8th Earl of Portarlington (born 1965)
- Edward Lionel Seymour Dawson-Damer (born 1967)
- Lady Marina Dawson-Damer (born 1969)
- Henry Lionel Seymour Dawson-Damer (born 1971)

The heir apparent is the present holder's son, Henry Dawson-Damer, Viscount Carlow (born 2009).

== See also ==
- Earl of Dorchester
