= Charles Coote =

Charles Coote may refer to:

- Sir Charles Coote, 1st Baronet (1581–1642), English soldier and administrator in Ireland.
- Charles Coote, 1st Earl of Mountrath (died 1661), Irish peer
- Charles Coote (1694–1761), Irish politician, MP for Castlemartyr 1715–27
- Charles Coote (1695–1750), Irish politician, MP for Granard 1723–27, and for Cavan County 1727–50
- Charles Coote, 2nd Earl of Mountrath (c. 1630–1672), Anglo-Irish politician and peer
- Charles Coote, 3rd Earl of Mountrath (c. 1655–1709), Anglo-Irish peer and official
- Charles Coote, 7th Earl of Mountrath (c. 1725–1802), Irish peer and landowner
- Charles Coote, 1st Earl of Bellomont (1738–1800), Irish politician, MP for Cavan County 1761–66, Postmaster General of Ireland 1789–97
- Charles Coote, 2nd Baron Castle Coote (1754–1823), Irish politician
- Sir Charles Coote, 9th Baronet (1794–1864), Irish Conservative and Tory politician
- Charles Henry Coote (1840–1899), librarian at the British Museum
- Sir Charles Algernon Coote, 4th Baronet (1847–1920), of the Coote baronets
- Charles Coote (priest, died 1780), Dean of Kilfenora
- Charles Coote (priest, died 1796), Dean of Kilfenora
- Charles Coote (cricketer) (1847–1893), Irish cricketer

== See also ==
- Coote (surname)
