= Baron Castle Coote =

Title in Peerage of Ireland

Baron Castle Coote, in the County of Roscommon, was a title in the Peerage of Ireland. It was created in 1800 for Charles Coote, 7th Earl of Mountrath, with remainder to his kinsman Charles Coote. The earldom of Mountrath became extinct on his death in 1802 (see Coote baronets of Castle Cuffe (1621) for earlier history of the Coote family) while he was succeeded in the barony according to the special remainder by the aforementioned Charles Coote, the second Baron, who had previously represented Queen's County and Maryborough in the Irish House of Commons. The second Baron was the son of the Very Reverend Charles Coote, Dean of Kilfenora, great-grandson of Chidley Coote, younger son of Sir Charles Coote, 1st Baronet and brother of Charles Coote, 1st Earl of Mountrath. He was succeeded by his only surviving son, Eyre, the third Baron, who died childless in 1827, when the barony became extinct.

The second Baron was the nephew of Sir Eyre Coote, the brother of Sir Eyre Coote, the uncle of Eyre Coote, MP for Clonmel, and the first cousin once removed of Charles Coote, who succeeded in the Coote Baronetcy of Castle Cuffe on the death of the seventh Earl of Mountrath in 1802 (see Coote baronets for further history of this title).

== Barons Castle Coote (1800) ==
- Charles Henry Coote, 7th Earl of Mountrath, 1st Baron Castle Coote (1725–1802)
- Charles Henry Coote, 2nd Baron Castle Coote (1754–1823)
  - Hon. Charles Henry Coote (1781–1810)
- Eyre Coote, 3rd Baron Castle Coote (1793–1827)

== See also ==
- Coote baronets
- Earl of Bellomont
