= Lios na gCearrbhach =

Lios na gCearrbhach refers to:

- The Irish name of the town of Lisburn, Northern Ireland
- The Irish form of Lisnagarvey, the townland where Lisburn is situated
