= Coote baronets of Donnybrooke (1774) =

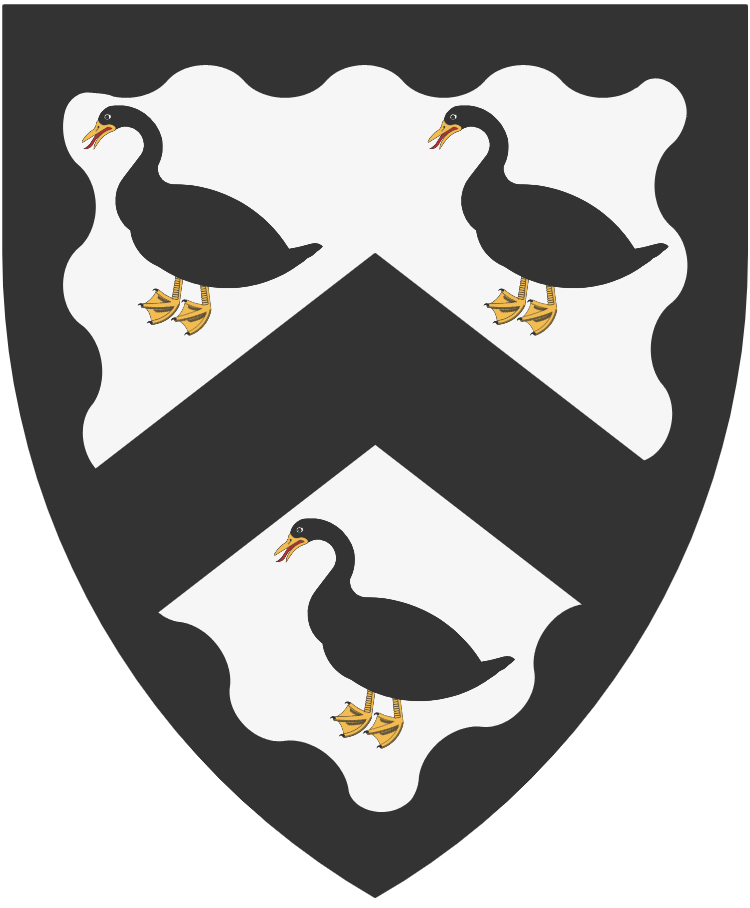
Arms of Coote of Donnybrook

The Coote baronetcy, of Donnybrooke in the County of Dublin, was created in the Baronetage of Ireland on 18 May 1774 for Charles Coote, 1st Earl of Bellomont, with special remainder to his illegitimate son Charles Coote.

Lord Bellomont was the great-grandson of Richard Coote, 1st Baron Coote, younger son of Sir Charles Coote, 1st Baronet, of the 1st creation. On his death in 1800 the earldom and barony of Coote became extinct while he was succeeded in the baronetcy according to the special remainder.

The baronetcy became extinct on the death of the 4th Baronet, in 1920.

== Coote baronets, of Donnybrooke (1774) ==
- Charles Coote, 1st Earl of Bellomont, 1st Baronet (1738–1800)
- Sir Charles Coote, 2nd Baronet (1765–1857)
- Sir Charles Coote, 3rd Baronet (1798–1861)
- Sir Charles Algernon Coote, 4th Baronet (1847–1920)

== Notes ==
Baronetage of Great Britain
Preceded by Palliser baronets	Coote baronets of Donnybrooke; 18 May 1774	Succeeded by Clayton baronets
