= Henry Coote, 5th Earl of Mountrath =

British politician

Henry Coote, 5th Earl of Mountrath (4 January 1684 – 27 March 1720), styled The Honourable Henry Coote until 1715, was an Irish peer and politician who sat in the British House of Commons from 1715 to 1720.

Coote was the second son of Charles Coote, 3rd Earl of Mountrath and his wife Lady Isabella Dormer, daughter of Charles Dormer, 2nd Earl of Carnarvon. His father died in 1709 and his elder brother Charles, who succeeded to the earldom, died unmarried, and Henry inherited in his turn on 14 September 1715.

Mountrath had entered Parliament in February 1715, as Whig Member of Parliament for Knaresborough in Yorkshire. As the earldom was Irish, it did not disqualify him from keeping his seat when he succeeded his brother, and he remained Member for Knaresborough until his death five years later. He was appointed to the Privy Council of Ireland in 1718.

Mountrath died unmarried, and the title passed to his younger brother, Algernon (1689–1744).

Parliament of Great Britain
Preceded by Henry Slingsby; Francis Fawkes	Member of Parliament for Knaresborough; 1715–1720; With: Robert Hitch	Succeeded by Robert Hitch; Hon Richard Arundell
Peerage of Ireland
Preceded by Charles Coote	Earl of Mountrath; 1715–1720	Succeeded by Algernon Coote
