= Sir Henry Slingsby, 5th Baronet =

British Member of Parliament (c. 1693–1763)

Sir Henry Slingsby, 5th Baronet (c. 1693 – 1763) of Scriven was a British landowner and politician who sat in the House of Commons for 41 years between 1714 and 1763.

Slingsby was the eldest son of Sir Thomas Slingsby, 4th Baronet and his wife Sarah Savile, daughter of John Savile of Methley, near Leeds. He matriculated at University College, Oxford on 13 October 1710, aged 17. He succeeded his father in the baronetcy in November 1726. In 1729, he married Mary Aislabie, daughter of John Aislabie of Studley, Yorkshire who was Chancellor of the Exchequer from 1718 to 1721.

Slingsby was returned as a Tory Member of Parliament for Knaresborough on his family's interest at a by-election on 17 May 1714. He was defeated at the general election of 1715, but regained his seat in 1722. He was returned unopposed at the general elections o 1727, 1734 and 1741 and voted regularly with the Opposition. In 1743 he was put forward by a French emissary to be one of a council to be set up to advise the Young Pretender on his arrival in England following a Jacobite rising and French invasion. Although he was not appointed, he was one of the few people who were given military details of the proposed French landing. He continued to be returned for Knaresborough without opposition at the general elections of 1747, 1754 and 1761.

Slingsby died without issue on 18 January 1763. He was succeeded in the baronetcy by his brothers Thomas and then Savile Slingsby.

Scriven Hall was built in about 1730. The house went out of the Slingsby family in the 19th century and was demolished after a fire in 1952. All that remains are the former stables and a coach house built in 1682 which were converted to residential use in about 1965 and form a Grade II listed building.

Parliament of Great Britain
Preceded by Francis Fawkes; Robert Byerley	Member of Parliament for Knaresborough; 1714–1715; With: Francis Fawkes	Succeeded by Henry Coote; Robert Hitch
Preceded by Hon. Richard Arundell; Robert Hitch	Member of Parliament for Knaresborough; 1722–1763; With: Hon. Richard Arundell 1722–1758; Hon Robert Walsingham 1758–1761; Lord John Cavendish 1761–1763	Succeeded by Lord John Cavendish; Sir Anthony Abdy, Bt
Baronetage of Nova Scotia
Preceded by Thomas Slingsby	Baronet (of Scriven); 1726-1763	Succeeded by Thomas Slingsby
