= Gabriel King =

Gabriel King may refer to:

- Gabriel King, joint pseudonym of authors Jane Johnson & M. John Harrison
- Gabriel King (mayor), mayor of Galway 1657-58
