= General Coote =

General Coote may refer to:

- Charles Coote, 1st Earl of Mountrath (c. 1610–1661), Anglo-Irish general
- Eyre Coote (British Army officer) (1762–1823), British Army general
- Eyre Coote (East India Company officer) (1726–1783), British East India Company lieutenant general
