= Richard Arundell (died 1758) =

British Member of Parliament (c. 1696–1758)

Member of Parliament for Knaresborough
- In office 1720-1758

Treasurer of the Chamber
- In office 1746-1755
- Appointed by: Henry Pelham

Lord Commissioner of the Treasury
- In office 1744-1746
- Appointed by: Henry Pelham

Personal details
- Born: c. 1696
- Died: 20 January 1758 (aged 61–62)
- Spouse: Frances Manners (m. 1732)
- Parents: John Arundell (father); Barbara Herbert (mother)
- Relatives: Thomas Slingsby (grandfather); Richard Arundell (grandfather)

The Honourable Richard Arundell (c. 1696 – 20 January 1758) was an English courtier, administrator and politician who sat in the House of Commons from 1720 to 1758.

== Biography ==
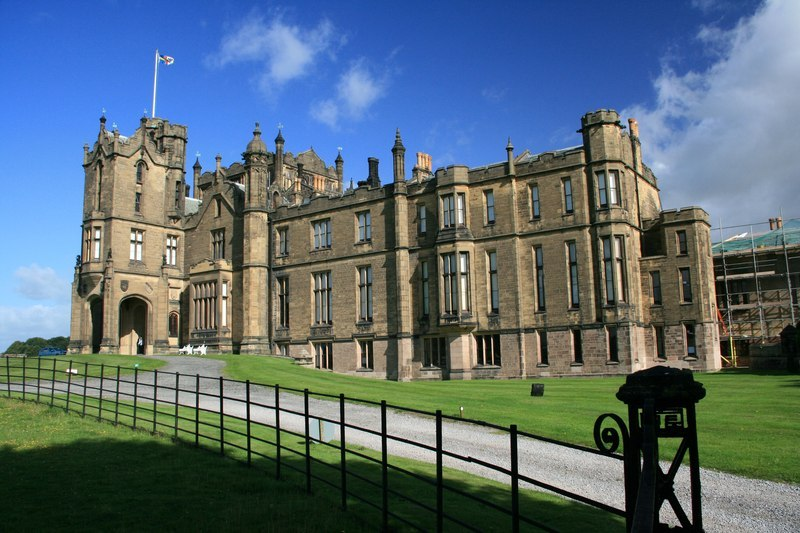
Allerton Castle, Arundell's Yorkshire home

Arundell was the second son of John Arundell, 2nd Baron Arundell of Trerice and his second wife Barbara, the widow of Sir Richard Mauleverer, 4th Baronet, of Allerton Mauleverer, Yorkshire. He succeeded his mother to Allerton Mauleverer in 1721.

Arundell was a page to Queen Anne from 1707 to 1714. With the patronage of his friend the Earl of Burlington he was returned unopposed as Member of Parliament for Knaresborough at a by-election on 16 April 1720. He retained the seat unopposed until his death in 1758. In 1726 he was appointed Surveyor of the King's Works by Sir Robert Walpole, holding the post until 1737, when he accepted the more lucrative post of Master of the Mint (until 1744). He was also Surveyor of the King's Private Roads from 1731 to 1744.

In 1744 Prime Minister Henry Pelham (Arundell's brother-in-law) appointed Arundell a Lord Commissioner of the Treasury, promoting him to be Treasurer of the Chamber in 1746, a position he held until 1755. He was also awarded in 1748 the sinecure of Clerk of the Pipe for life.

In 1740 Arundell was elected a Fellow of the Royal Society.

Arundell died childless on 20 January 1758. He had married Lady Frances Manners, the daughter of John Manners, 2nd Duke of Rutland in August 1732.

Parliament of Great Britain
Preceded by Henry Coote; Robert Hitch	Member of Parliament for Knaresborough; 1720–1758; With: Robert Hitch 1720-1722; Sir Henry Slingsby, Bt 1722-1758	Succeeded by Hon Robert Walsingham; Sir Henry Slingsby, Bt
