= Algernon Coote, 6th Earl of Mountrath =

Anglo-Irish peer

Algernon Coote, 6th Earl of Mountrath PC (Ire) (6 June 1689 – 27 August 1744), styled The Honourable Algernon Coote until 1720, was an Anglo-Irish peer who sat as a Member of Parliament in the Parliament of Ireland as well as in the Parliament of Great Britain.

Coote was the third son of Charles Coote, 3rd Earl of Mountrath (1655–1709). He was educated at St Paul's School and Trinity College, Cambridge, where he matriculated in 1706. Coote was elected to the Irish House of Commons for Jamestown in 1715. His elder brothers, Charles and Henry, both succeeded to the earldom before him but died unmarried. Coote succeeded in his turn on 27 March 1720 and ascended to the Irish House of Lords.

Mountrath was appointed to the Privy Council of Ireland in 1723. As his earldom was also Irish, it did not disqualify him from sitting in the British House of Commons, and he entered Parliament in the same year as member for Castle Rising in Norfolk, which he represented for ten years. He also became Governor of Queen's County.

In 1741 he stood for Parliament again at Hedon in Yorkshire, and was initially declared defeated. However, on petition to the House of Commons (in those days the normal procedure in a disputed election), the result was overturned and on 4 March 1742 Mountrath was declared elected after all. He sat as member for the borough for the remaining two years of his life.

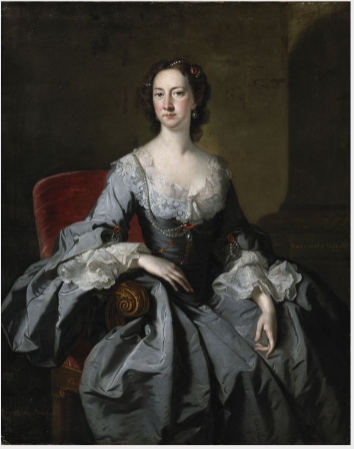
Diana, Countess of Mountrath (1696-1766), painting by Thomas Hudson, 1746.

In 1721 he married Lady Diana Newport (d. 1766), daughter of the 2nd Earl of Bradford. Horace Walpole described her as being "as rich and as tipsy as Cacofogo in the comedy. What a jumble of avarice, lewdness, dignity – and claret!". They had only one child, Charles (c. 1725–1802), who succeeded to the earldom on Mountrath's death in 1744, but who died unmarried, the title thereby becoming extinct.

Parliament of Ireland
Preceded by Gilbert King; John King	Member of Parliament for Jamestown; 1715–1720; With: Gilbert King	Succeeded by Richard Geering; John King
Parliament of Great Britain
Preceded by Charles Churchill; William Feilding	Member of Parliament for Castle Rising; 1724–1734; With: Charles Churchill	Succeeded by Charles Churchill; Thomas Hanmer
Preceded by Francis Chute; Luke Robinson	Member of Parliament for Hedon; 1742–1744; With: George Berkeley	Succeeded by George Berkeley; George Anson
Peerage of Ireland
Preceded by Henry Coote	Earl of Mountrath; 1720–1744	Succeeded by Charles Henry Coote
