= Clayton baronets of Adlington (1774) =

Escutcheon of the Clayton baronets of Adlington

The Clayton baronetcy, of Adlington in the County Palatine of Lancaster, was created in the Baronetage of Great Britain on 19 May 1774 for Richard Clayton, with remainder, failing heirs male of his own, to the heirs male of his father. Clayton served as British consul in Nantes and as a Recorder of Wigan. He died without male issue and was succeeded according to the special remainder by his younger brother, the 2nd Baronet. He was childless and on his death in 1839 the baronetcy became extinct.

== Clayton baronets, of Adlington (1774) ==
- Sir Richard Clayton, 1st Baronet (c. 1745–1828)
- Sir Robert Clayton, 2nd Baronet (1746–1839)

== Notes ==
Baronetage of Great Britain
Preceded by Coote baronets	Clayton baronets of Adlington; 19 May 1774	Succeeded by Edmonstone baronets
