= Hugh Cuffe =

English-born merchant and soldier

Hugh Cuffe was an English-born merchant, soldier, and landowner in Ireland. Along with his brother Philip Cuffe he took part in the Plantation of Munster in the 1580s that followed the defeat of the Desmond Rebellion. Cuffe was assigned lands at Kilmore in northern County Cork. Cuffe was one of the landowners who lost territory due to legal challenges from local Old English inhabitants who successfully claimed that the land belonged to them. This was a common occurrence at the time as people were able to show they had land wrongly confiscated from them although they had not taken part in the rebellion. The loss of this land led Cuffe to abandon plans to settle large numbers of Dutch settlers on part of his estate.

The first Munster Plantation was almost entirely destroyed during Tyrone's Rebellion, and Cuffe's estate was overrun. Cuffe took charge of the garrison at the besieged town of Kilmallock during the early stages of the fighting. He fell out of favour following the arrival of the Earl of Essex as Lord Lieutenant despite being related to Henry Cuffe, Essex's secretary. He returned to England and attempted to get command of a company of troops, but his request was rejected. When he returned to Ireland following Essex's dismissal, it was in the role of a commissary.

He sold some of his land to Lord Audley who went on to establish a leading Irish dynasty. Cuffe's two daughters were married off to other settlers Francis Slingsby and Charles Coote. These men were veterans of the war who played a part in the rebuilding of the Munster Plantation following the Treaty of Mellifont.

== Bibliography ==
- MacCarthy-Morrogh, Michael. The Munster Plantation: English Migration to Southern Ireland, 1583-1641. Clarendon Press, 1986.
