= Battle of Lisnagarvey =

- Part of Cromwellian conquest of Ireland
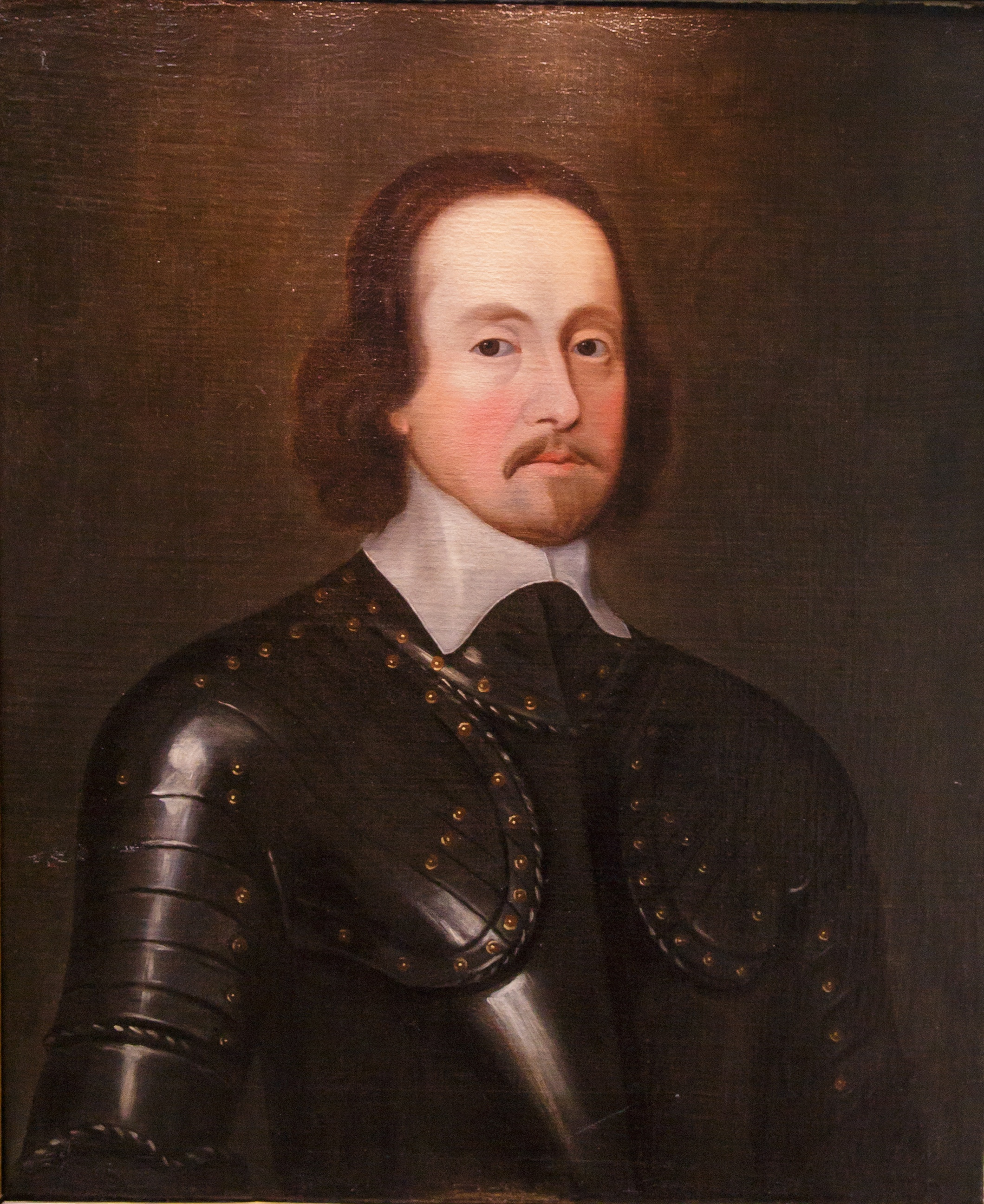
- Sir Charles Coote, Commonwealth commander in Northern Ulster
Date	6 December 1649
Location	Lisnagarvey, County Antrim 54.476°N 6.036°E
Result	Parliamentarian victory

Belligerents
English Parliamentarians	(Kingdom of Ireland) Royalists; Scots Covenanters

Commanders and leaders
Sir Charles Coote; Col. Venables	(Kingdom of Ireland) Lord Clandeboye; Col. Munro

Strength
c. 3,000	c. 5,000

Casualties and losses
Minimal	c. 1,500 killed or captured

The Battle of Lisnagarvey (Note: Also known as the Battle of Lisnetrain) was fought on 6 December 1649, near Lisnagarvey (Note: now Lisburn) during the Irish Confederate Wars, an associated conflict of the 1638 to 1651 Wars of the Three Kingdoms. Forces loyal to the Commonwealth of England defeated an army supporting Charles II of England, composed of Royalists and Scots Covenanters.

In early December, Sir Charles Coote and Robert Venables advanced on Carrickfergus, the only northern port not controlled by the Commonwealth. Covenanter leader George Munro joined forces with his Royalist colleague Lord Clandeboye in order to prevent this.

On 6 December, the two advance guards clashed at Lisnagarvey; despite greater numbers, the Royalist-Covenanter army was no match for their more experienced opponents. Most of their army fled without firing a shot, and retreat quickly became a rout, with over 1,500 killed or captured in the pursuit.

Lord Clandeboye surrendered shortly afterwards, followed by Carrickfergus on 13 December. Munro escaped to Enniskillen, before returning to Scotland early in 1650.

== Background ==
The Irish Confederate Wars, sparked by the 1641 Rebellion, were initially fought between the predominantly Catholic Confederation, and a largely Protestant government army led by Ormond. Both claimed to be loyal to Charles I, while there was a three sided war in Ulster. The latter involved Royalists, Gaelic Catholic leader Eoghan Ó Néill, and Presbyterian militia known as the Laggan Army, supported by Scots Covenanters under Robert Munro.

In September 1643, Ormond agreed a truce, or 'Cessation', with the Confederation, freeing his troops for use in England against Parliament in the First English Civil War. Some Irish Protestants objected, and switched sides, including Sir Charles Coote, who became Parliamentarian commander in Connacht. Charles surrendered in 1646, while a Covenanter/Royalist uprising was quickly suppressed in the 1648 Second English Civil War. On 17 January 1649, the Confederation allied with Ormond's Royalists; following the execution of Charles on 30 January, they were joined by the Laggan Army, and remaining Scots troops in Ulster.

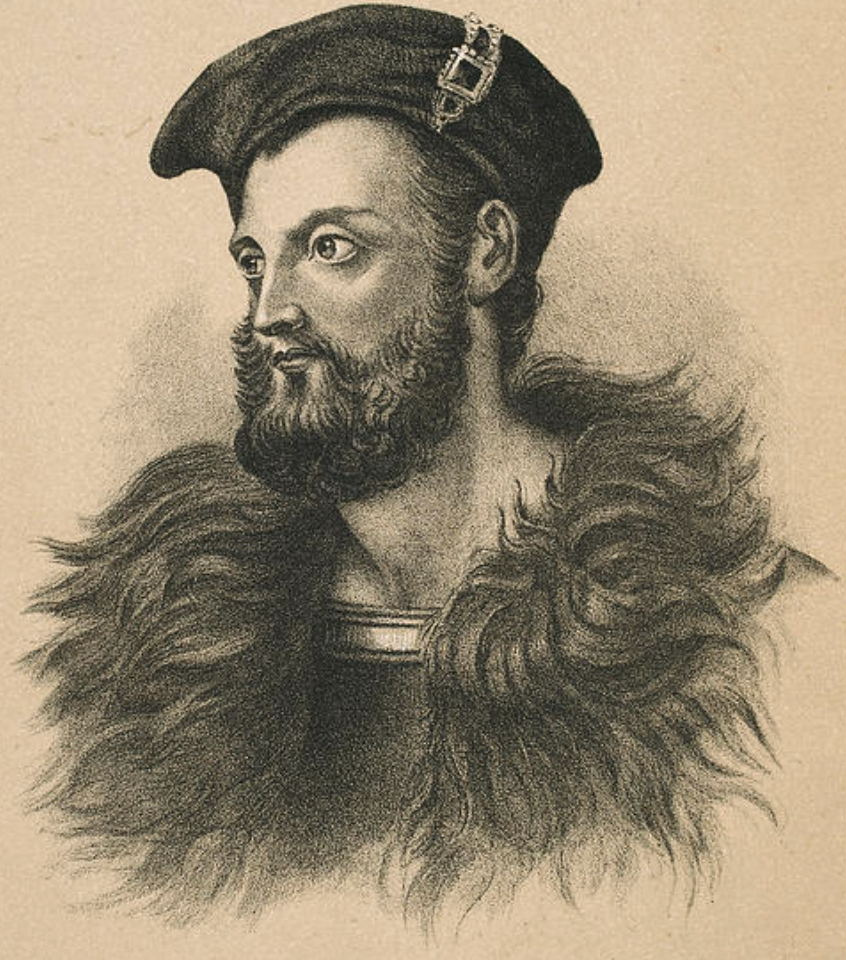
Eoghan Ó Néill; his refusal to support the Alliance in Ulster undermined its ability to resist Commonwealth forces

There were various reasons for this. The Covenanter government, who provided support for Scottish settlers in Ulster, considered Cromwell and other leaders of the new Commonwealth of England dangerous political and religious radicals. As Scots, they objected to the execution of their king by the English; as Presbyterians, they viewed monarchy as divinely ordained, making it also sacrilegious, and transferred their allegiance to his son, Charles II of England.

However, this was offset by a split within the Confederation, between Catholic landowners who wanted to preserve the position prevailing in 1641, and those like Ó Néill, whose estates had been confiscated in 1607. As a result, he agreed a truce with Coote, and refused to join the Alliance, depriving them of their most effective fighting force in the north. Despite this, by late July, Ormond's combined Royalist/Confederate army controlled most of Ireland.

In Ulster, Derry was the only major town still held by forces loyal to the Commonwealth. The garrison was commanded by Coote, who was besieged by the Laggan Army under George Munro, Robert's nephew. In July, Munro was forced to lift the siege by Ó Néill, an example of the impact of the truce between two unlikely allies.

Ormond's defeat at Rathmines on 2 August allowed Cromwell and an army of 12,000 to land in Dublin unopposed. After capturing Drogheda on 11 September, his main force headed south towards Wexford; Colonel Robert Venables was sent north with three regiments, or around 2,500 men, to take control of Ulster. Munro's garrisons surrendered with minimal resistance, and by the end of September, Venables had occupied Dundalk, Carlingford, Newry, and Belfast. These were accompanied by the mass expulsion of Scots settlers, as punishment for their defection; when Coote captured Coleraine on 15 September, he massacred the largely Scottish garrison.

== Battle ==
1649 campaign in Ulster; key locations

At the end of October, Coote joined Venables at Belfast; they spent November reducing remaining Royalist garrisons in the north, and in early December, assembled 3,000 men to attack Carrickfergus. After lifting the siege of Derry, Munro had retreated to Enniskillen with the remainder of the Laggan Army. Since the loss of Carrickfergus would effectively cut communications with Scotland, he was determined to prevent this if at all possible.

He combined forces with Royalist leader Lord Clandeboye, creating an army of around 5,000. However, it comprised remnants from many different regiments, its men were poorly equipped, and demoralised, while most had not been paid for over two years. As they marched north, their numbers dwindled due to desertion.

Learning of their advance, Coote and Venables moved to intercept Munro, and the two advance guards made contact outside Lisnagarvey, near Lisburn, on 6 December. Despite superior numbers, the Royalists could not hold their ground against their far more experienced opponents. When the main body of the Parliamentarian force appeared, retreat rapidly turned into a rout, the majority fleeing without firing a shot; in the pursuit that followed, they lost 1,500 men, killed or captured, along with their baggage train and supplies. Clandeboye and the remnants of his army surrendered shortly afterwards, although Monro escaped to Enniskillen.

== Aftermath ==
Lisnagarvey ended resistance by Scottish forces to the Parliamentarian army; Carrickfergus surrendered on 13 December, and as with other towns, its Scottish settlers were expelled. Early in 1650, Monro agreed to evacuate Enniskillen for £500, and returned to Scotland, leaving Ó Néill's army as the only remaining obstacle to Parliamentarian control of the north. However, his death in November 1649 proved a major blow to its morale and fighting ability; in June 1650, it was destroyed by Coote and Venables at Scarrifholis.

== Sources ==
- Bennett, Martyn (1999). The Civil Wars Experienced: Britain and Ireland, 1638-1661. Routledge. ISBN 978-0415159029.
- Connolly, SJ (2008). Divided Kingdom: Ireland 1630-1800. OUP. ISBN 978-0199543472.
- Morrill, John (2004). "Venables, Robert". Oxford Dictionary of National Biography (online ed.). Oxford University Press. doi:10.1093/ref:odnb/28181. (Subscription, Wikipedia Library access or UK public library membership required.)
- Royle, Trevor (2004). Civil War: The Wars of the Three Kingdoms 1638–1660 (2006 ed.). Abacus. ISBN 978-0-349-11564-1.
- Scott, David (2003). Politics and War in the Three Stuart Kingdoms, 1637-49. Palgrave. ISBN 978-0333658741.
- Wedgwood, CV (1958). The King's War, 1641-1647 (2001 ed.). Penguin Classics. ISBN 978-0141390727.
