= Charles Coote, 7th Earl of Mountrath =

Irish peer and landowner

The Right Honourable The Earl of Mountrath PC
- Born: c. 1725
- Died: 2 March 1802
- Title: 7th Earl of Mountrath, Baron Castle Cootes
- Predecessor: Algernon Coote, 6th Earl of Mountrath
- Successor: Sir Charles Coote, 9th Baronet
- Father: Algernon Coote, 6th Earl of Mountrath

Charles Henry Coote, 7th Earl of Mountrath PC (c. 1725 – 2 March 1802), styled Viscount Coote until 1744, was an Irish peer and landowner.

Styled Viscount Coote from birth, he was the son of Algernon Coote, 6th Earl of Mountrath, by Lady Diana Newport, daughter of Richard Newport, 2nd Earl of Bradford. He succeeded his father in the earldom in 1744. In 1761 he was sworn of the Irish Privy Council. In 1800, with no legitimate heirs and with the earldom heading for extinction, Mountrath was created Baron Castle Coote, in the County of Roscommon, in the Irish peerage, with a special remainder to his kinsman, Charles Coote.

Lord Mountrath died in March 1802. He had no legitimate male issue and the earldom and its associated titles created in 1660 died with him. The barony of Castle Coote passed according to the special remainder to his kinsman, Charles Coote. The baronetcy of Castle Cuffe also held by the Earl passed to another kinsman, Sir Charles Coote, 9th Baronet.

Lord Mountrath's illegitimate son, Charles, was born on 30 July 1761 to his then mistress, Mary Preston.

Peerage of Ireland
Preceded by Algernon Coote	Earl of Mountrath; 1744–1802	Extinct
New creation	Baron Castle Coote; 1800–1802	Succeeded by Charles Henry Coote
Baronetage of Ireland
Preceded by Algernon Coote	Baronet (of Castle Cuffe); 1744–1802	Succeeded by Charles Henry Coote
