= Cromwellian conquest of Ireland =

Military campaign (1649–1653)

- Part of Irish Confederate Wars and Wars of the Three Kingdoms
- Oliver Cromwell
| Date | 15 August 1649 – 27 September 1653 |
| Location | Ireland |
| Result | Commonwealth victory |
| Territorial changes | Ireland becomes part of the Commonwealth |

Belligerents
| Commonwealth of England | Confederates; Royalists; Scottish Covenanters |

Commanders and leaders
| Oliver Cromwell; Michael Jones; Henry Ireton; Edmund Ludlow; Charles Fleetwood; Charles Coote | James Butler; Ulick Burke; Owen Roe O'Neill; Heber MacMahon |

Strength
| c. 20,000 (peak) | c. 20,000 to 30,000 (peak) |

Casualties and losses
| 15,600-20,800 dead or missing | 25,000+ casualties |

The Cromwellian conquest of Ireland, 1649 to 1653, refers to the defeat of the Irish Catholic Confederation and their allies, by forces of the Commonwealth of England, led by Oliver Cromwell. It concluded the 1641 to 1653 Irish Confederate Wars and 1639 to 1653 Wars of the Three Kingdoms, which modern estimates generally agree led to an overall decline in the pre-1641 Irish population of over 15-25%, due to war, famine and disease.

The Irish Rebellion of 1641 brought much of Ireland under the control of the Catholic Confederation, who engaged in a multi-sided contest with Royalists, Parliamentarians, Scots Covenanters, and local Presbyterian militia. Following the execution of Charles I in January 1649, the Confederates and their former Royalist opponents allied against the newly established Commonwealth of England. Cromwell landed near Dublin in August 1649 with an expeditionary force, and by the end of 1650 the Confederacy had been defeated, although sporadic guerrilla warfare continued until 1653.

The Act for the Settlement of Ireland 1652 barred Catholics from most public offices and much of their land was transferred to Protestant settlers. These confiscations proved a continuing source of grievance, while Cromwell remains a deeply reviled figure in Ireland, although his personal responsibility for the atrocities remains a matter of debate among historians.

== Background ==
Following the execution of Charles I in January 1649, the newly established Commonwealth of England took steps to regain control of Ireland. The first and most pressing reason was an alliance signed in 1649 between the Irish Confederate Catholics and Charles II, proclaimed King of Ireland in January 1649. This allowed for Royalist troops to be sent to Ireland and put the Irish Confederate Catholic troops under the command of Royalist officers led by James Butler, Earl of Ormonde.

Secondly, Parliament also had a longstanding commitment to re-conquer Ireland dating back to the Irish Rebellion of 1641. Even if the Irish Confederates had not allied themselves with the Royalists, it is likely that the English Parliament would have eventually tried to invade the country to crush Catholic power there. They had sent Parliamentary forces to Ireland throughout the Wars of the Three Kingdoms (most of them under Michael Jones in 1647). They viewed Ireland as part of the territory governed by right by the Kingdom of England and only temporarily out of its control since the Rebellion of 1641. Many Parliamentarians wished to punish the Irish for atrocities committed against the mainly Scottish Protestant settlers during the 1641 Uprising. Furthermore, some Irish towns (notably Wexford and Waterford) had acted as bases from which privateers had attacked English shipping throughout the 1640s.

In addition, the English Parliament had a financial imperative to invade Ireland to confiscate land there in order to repay its creditors. The Parliament had raised loans of £10 million under the Adventurers' Act to subdue Ireland since 1642, on the basis that its creditors would be repaid with land confiscated from Irish Catholic rebels. To repay these loans, it would be necessary to conquer Ireland and confiscate such land. The Parliamentarians also had internal political reasons to send forces to Ireland. Army mutinies at Banbury and Bishopsgate in April and May 1649 were unsettling the New Model Army, and the soldiers' demands would probably increase if they were left idle.

Finally, for some Parliamentarians, the war in Ireland was a religious war (despite Covenanters armies from Scotland being Protestant Presbyterian). Cromwell and much of his army were Puritans who considered all Roman Catholics to be heretics, and so for them the conquest was partly a crusade. The Irish Confederates had been supplied with arms and money by the Papacy and had welcomed the papal legate Pierfrancesco Scarampi and later the Papal Nuncio Giovanni Battista Rinuccini in 1643–49.

== Battle of Rathmines and Cromwell's landing in Ireland ==
By the end of the period, known as Confederate Ireland, in 1649, the only remaining Parliamentarian outpost in Ireland was in Dublin, under the command of Colonel Jones. A combined Royalist and Confederate force under the Marquess of Ormonde gathered at Rathmines, south of Dublin, to take the city and deprive the Parliamentarians of a port in which they could land. Jones, however, launched a surprise attack on the Royalists while they were deploying on 2 August, putting them to flight. Jones claimed to have killed around 4,000 Royalist or Confederate soldiers and taken 2,517 prisoners.

Oliver Cromwell called the battle "an astonishing mercy, so great and seasonable that we are like them that dreamed", as it meant that he had a secure port at which he could land his army in Ireland, and that he retained the capital city. With Admiral Robert Blake blockading the remaining Royalist fleet under Prince Rupert of the Rhine in Kinsale, Cromwell landed on 15 August with thirty-five ships filled with troops and equipment. Henry Ireton landed two days later with a further seventy-seven ships.

Ormonde's troops retreated from around Dublin in disarray. They were badly demoralised by their unexpected defeat at Rathmines and were incapable of fighting another pitched battle in the short term. As a result, Ormonde hoped to hold the walled towns on Ireland's east coast to hold up the Cromwellian advance until the winter, when he hoped that "Colonel Hunger and Major Sickness" (i.e. hunger and disease) would deplete their ranks.

== Siege of Drogheda ==
Upon landing, Cromwell proceeded to take the other port cities on Ireland's east coast, to facilitate the efficient landing of supplies and reinforcements from England. The first town to fall was Drogheda, about 50 km north of Dublin. Drogheda was garrisoned by a regiment of 3,000 English Royalist and Irish Confederate soldiers, commanded by Arthur Aston. After a week-long siege, Cromwell's forces breached the walls protecting the town. Aston refused Cromwell's request that he surrender. In the ensuing battle for the town, Cromwell ordered that no quarter be given, and the majority of the garrison and Catholic priests were killed. Many civilians also died in the sack. Aston was beaten to death by the Roundheads with his own wooden leg.

The massacre of the garrison in Drogheda (which a large percentage of were English protestant Royalists and Catholics, including some after they had surrendered and some who had sheltered in a church) was received with horror in Ireland and is used today as an example of Cromwell's extreme cruelty. Having taken Drogheda, Cromwell took most of his army south to secure the southeastern ports. He sent a detachment of 5,000 men north under Robert Venables to take eastern Ulster from the remnants of a Scottish Presbyterian Covenanter army that had landed there in 1642. They defeated the Scots Presbyterian Protestants at the Battle of Lisnagarvey (6 December 1649) and linked up with a Parliamentarian army composed of English Plantation Protestant settlers based around Derry in western Ulster, which was commanded by Charles Coote.

== Wexford, Waterford and Duncannon ==
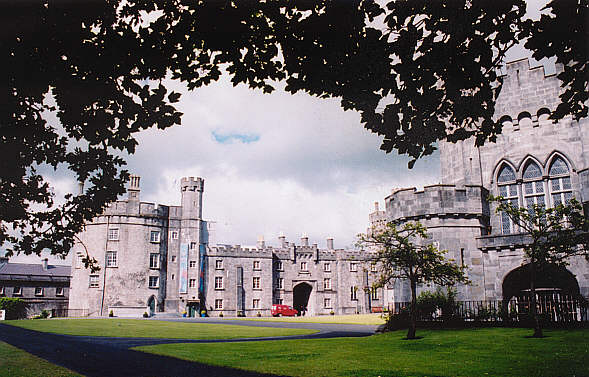
Kilkenny Castle. The Irish Confederate capital of Kilkenny fell to Cromwell in 1650.

The New Model Army then marched south to secure the ports of Wexford, Waterford and Duncannon. Wexford was the scene of another infamous atrocity: the Sack of Wexford, when Parliamentarian troops broke into the town while negotiations for its surrender were ongoing, and sacked it, killing about 2,000 soldiers and 1,500 townspeople and burning much of the town.

The Royalist commander Ormonde thought that the terror of Cromwell's army had a paralysing effect on his forces. Towns like New Ross and Carlow subsequently surrendered on terms when besieged by Cromwell's forces. On the other hand, the massacres of the defenders of Drogheda and Wexford prolonged resistance elsewhere, as they convinced many Irish Catholics that they would be killed even if they surrendered.

Such towns as Waterford, Duncannon, Clonmel, Limerick and Galway only surrendered after determined resistance. Cromwell was unable to take Waterford or Duncannon and the New Model Army had to retire to winter quarters, where many of its men died of disease, especially typhoid and dysentery. The port city of Waterford and Duncannon town eventually surrendered after prolonged sieges in 1650.

== Clonmel and the conquest of Munster ==
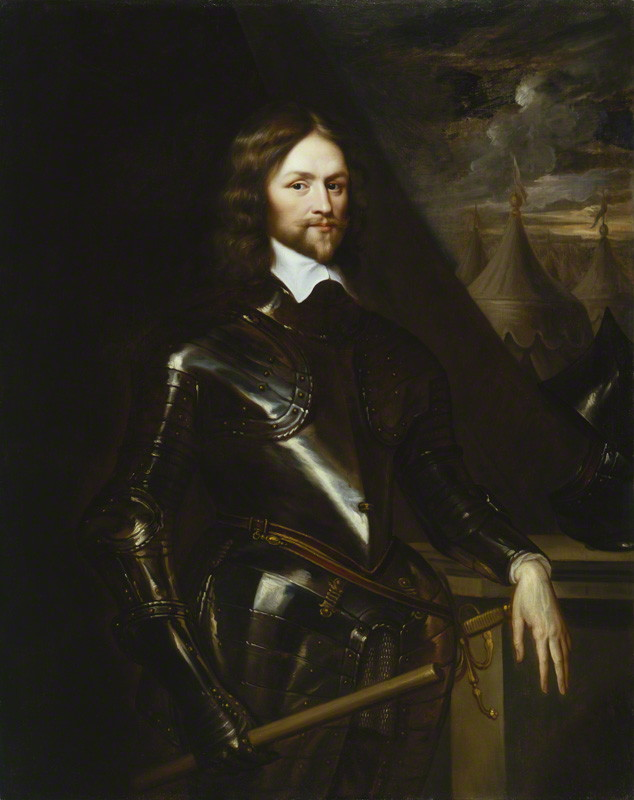
Henry Ireton. Cromwell passed the command of Parliamentarian forces in Ireland to Ireton in 1650. He died of disease at the Siege of Limerick in 1651.

The following spring, Cromwell mopped up the remaining walled towns in Ireland's southeast—notably the Confederate capital of Kilkenny, which surrendered on terms. The New Model Army met its only serious reverse in Ireland at the Siege of Clonmel, where its attacks on the town's defences were repulsed at a cost of up to 2,000 men. The town nevertheless surrendered the following day.

Cromwell's treatment of Kilkenny and Clonmel is in contrast to that of Drogheda and Wexford. Despite the fact that his troops had suffered heavy casualties attacking the former two, Cromwell respected surrender terms which guaranteed the lives and property of the townspeople and the evacuation of armed Irish troops who were defending them. The change in attitude on the part of the Parliamentarian commander may have been a recognition that excessive cruelty was prolonging Irish resistance. However, in the case of Drogheda and Wexford no surrender agreement had been negotiated, and by the rules of continental siege warfare prevalent in the mid-17th century, this meant no quarter would be given; thus it can be argued that Cromwell's attitude had not changed.

Ormonde's Royalists still held most of Munster, but were outflanked by a mutiny of their own garrison in Cork. The British Protestant troops there had been fighting for the Parliament up to 1648 and resented fighting with the Confederates. Their mutiny handed Cork and most of Munster to Cromwell and they defeated the local Irish garrison at the Battle of Macroom. The Irish and Royalist forces retreated behind the River Shannon into Connacht or (in the case of the remaining Munster forces) into the fastness of County Kerry.

== Collapse of the Royalist alliance ==
In May 1650, Charles II repudiated his alliance with the Irish Confederacy, and agreed the Treaty of Breda with the Covenanter government in Scotland. This totally undermined Ormonde's position as head of a Royalist coalition in Ireland. Cromwell published generous surrender terms for Protestant Royalists in Ireland and many of them either capitulated or went over to the Parliamentarian side.

This left in the field only the remaining Irish Catholic armies and a few diehard English Royalists. From this point onwards, many Irish Catholics, including their bishops and clergy, questioned why they should accept Ormonde's leadership when his master, the King, had repudiated his alliance with them. The outbreak of the Anglo-Scottish War forced Cromwell to leave Ireland and deal with the new threat, passing command to Henry Ireton.

== Scarrifholis and the destruction of the Ulster Army ==
The most formidable force left to the Irish and Royalists was the 6,000-strong army of Ulster, formerly commanded by Owen Roe O'Neill, who died in 1649. However the army was now commanded by an inexperienced Catholic bishop named Heber MacMahon. The Ulster Army met a Parliamentarian army commanded by Charles Coote, at the Battle of Scarrifholis in County Donegal in June 1650. The Ulster army was routed and as many as 2,000 of its men were killed. In addition, MacMahon and most of the Ulster Army's officers were either killed at the battle or captured and executed after it. This eliminated the last strong field army opposing the Parliamentarians in Ireland and secured for them the northern province of Ulster. Coote's army, despite suffering heavy losses at the Siege of Charlemont, the last Catholic stronghold in the north, was now free to march south and invade the west coast of Ireland.

== Sieges of Limerick and Galway ==
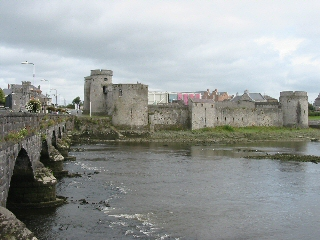
King John's Castle and Thomond Bridge, Limerick city. Ireton took Limerick in 1651 after a long siege.

The Parliamentarians crossed the River Shannon into the western province of Connacht in October 1650. An Irish army under Clanricarde had attempted to stop them but this was surprised and routed at the Battle of Meelick Island.

Ormonde was discredited by the constant stream of defeats for the Irish and Royalist forces and no longer had the confidence of the men he commanded, particularly the Irish Confederates. He fled for France in December 1650 and was replaced as commander by an Irish nobleman, Ulick Burke of Clanricarde. The Irish and Royalist forces were penned into the area west of the River Shannon and placed their last hope on defending the strongly walled cities of Limerick and Galway on Ireland's west coast. These cities had built extensive modern defences and could not be taken by a straightforward assault as at Drogheda or Wexford.

Ireton besieged Limerick while Charles Coote surrounded Galway, but they were unable to take the strongly fortified cities and instead blockaded them until a combination of hunger and disease forced them to surrender. An Irish force from County Kerry attempted to relieve Limerick from the south but was intercepted and routed at the Battle of Knocknaclashy. Limerick fell in 1651 and Galway the following year. Disease, however, killed indiscriminately and Ireton, along with thousands of Parliamentarian troops, died of plague outside Limerick in 1651.

== Guerrilla warfare, famine, and plague ==
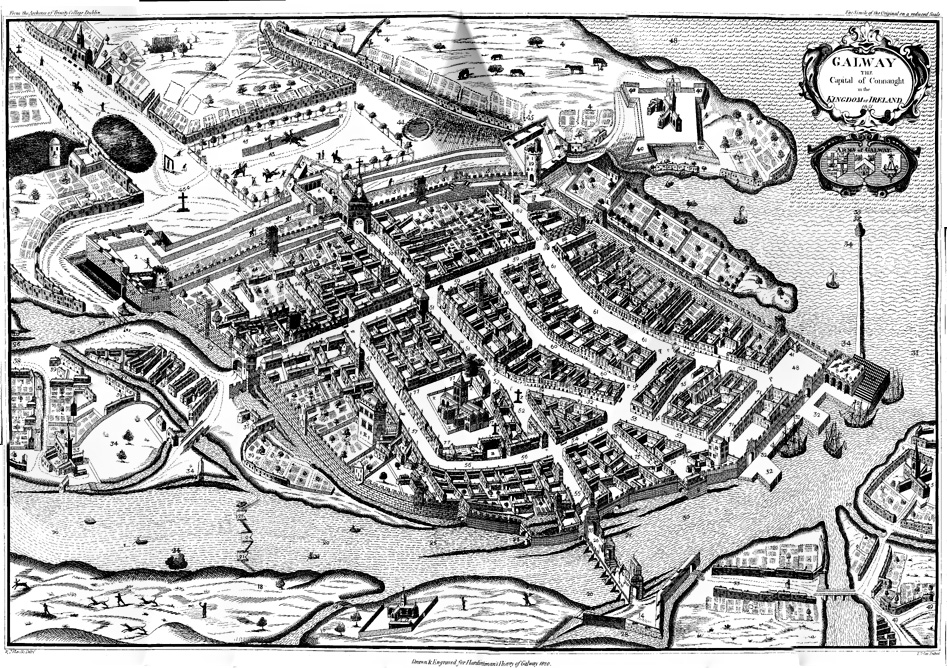
The heavily fortified city of Galway in 1651. It was the last Irish stronghold to fall to the Parliamentarians, surrendering in 1652.

The fall of Galway saw the end of organised resistance to the Cromwellian conquest, but fighting continued as small units of Irish troops launched guerrilla attacks on the Parliamentarians.

The guerrilla phase of the war had been going since late 1650 and at the end of 1651, despite the defeat of the main Irish or Royalist forces, there were still estimated to be 30,000 men in arms against the Parliamentarians. Tories (from the Irish word tóraí meaning "pursuer" or "outlaw") operated from difficult terrain such as the Bog of Allen, the Wicklow Mountains and the drumlin country in the north midlands, and within months made the countryside extremely dangerous for all except large parties of Parliamentarian troops. Ireton mounted a punitive expedition to the Wicklow mountains in 1650 to try to put down the Tories there, but without success.

By early 1651, it was reported that no English supply convoys were safe if they travelled more than two miles outside a military base. In response, the Parliamentarians destroyed food supplies and forcibly evicted civilians who were thought to be helping the Tories. John Hewson systematically destroyed food stocks in counties Wicklow and County Kildare. Hardress Waller did likewise in the Burren in County Clare, as did Colonel Cook in County Wexford. The result was famine throughout much of Ireland, aggravated by an outbreak of bubonic plague. As the guerrilla war ground on, the Parliamentarians, as of April 1651, designated areas such as County Wicklow and much of the south of the country as what would now be called free-fire zones, where anyone found would be, "taken slain and destroyed as enemies and their cattle and good shall be taken or spoiled as the goods of enemies". This tactic had succeeded in the Nine Years' War.

This phase of the war was by far the most costly in terms of civilian loss of life. The combination of warfare, famine and plague caused a huge mortality among the Irish population. William Petty estimated (in the 1655–56 Down Survey) that the death toll of the wars in Ireland since 1641 was over 618,000 people, or about 40% of the country's pre-war population. Of these, he estimated that over 400,000 were Catholics, 167,000 killed directly by war or famine, and the remainder by war-related disease. Modern estimates put the toll at closer to 20%.

In addition, some fifty thousand Irish people, including prisoners of war, were sold as indentured servants under the English Commonwealth regime. They were often sent to the English colonies in North America and the Caribbean where they subsequently comprised a substantial portion of certain Caribbean colony populations in the late 17th century. In Barbados, some of their descendants are known as Redlegs.

Eventually, the guerrilla war was ended when the Parliamentarians published surrender terms in 1652 allowing Irish troops to go abroad to serve in foreign armies not at war with the Commonwealth of England. Most went to France or Spain. The largest Irish guerrilla forces under John Fitzpatrick (in Leinster), Edmund O'Dwyer (in Munster) and Edmund Daly (in Connacht) surrendered in 1652, under terms signed at Kilkenny that May. However, up to 11,000 men, mostly in Ulster, were still thought to be in the field at the end of the year. The last Irish and Royalist forces (the remnants of the Confederate's Ulster Army, led by Philip O'Reilly) formally surrendered at Cloughoughter in County Cavan on 27 April 1653. The English Parliament then declared the Irish rebellion subdued on 27 September 1653. However, low-level guerrilla warfare continued for the remainder of the decade and was accompanied by widespread lawlessness. Undoubtedly some of the tories were simple brigands, whereas others were politically motivated. The Cromwellians distinguished in their rewards for information or capture of outlaws between "private tories" and "public tories".

== Cromwellian Settlement ==
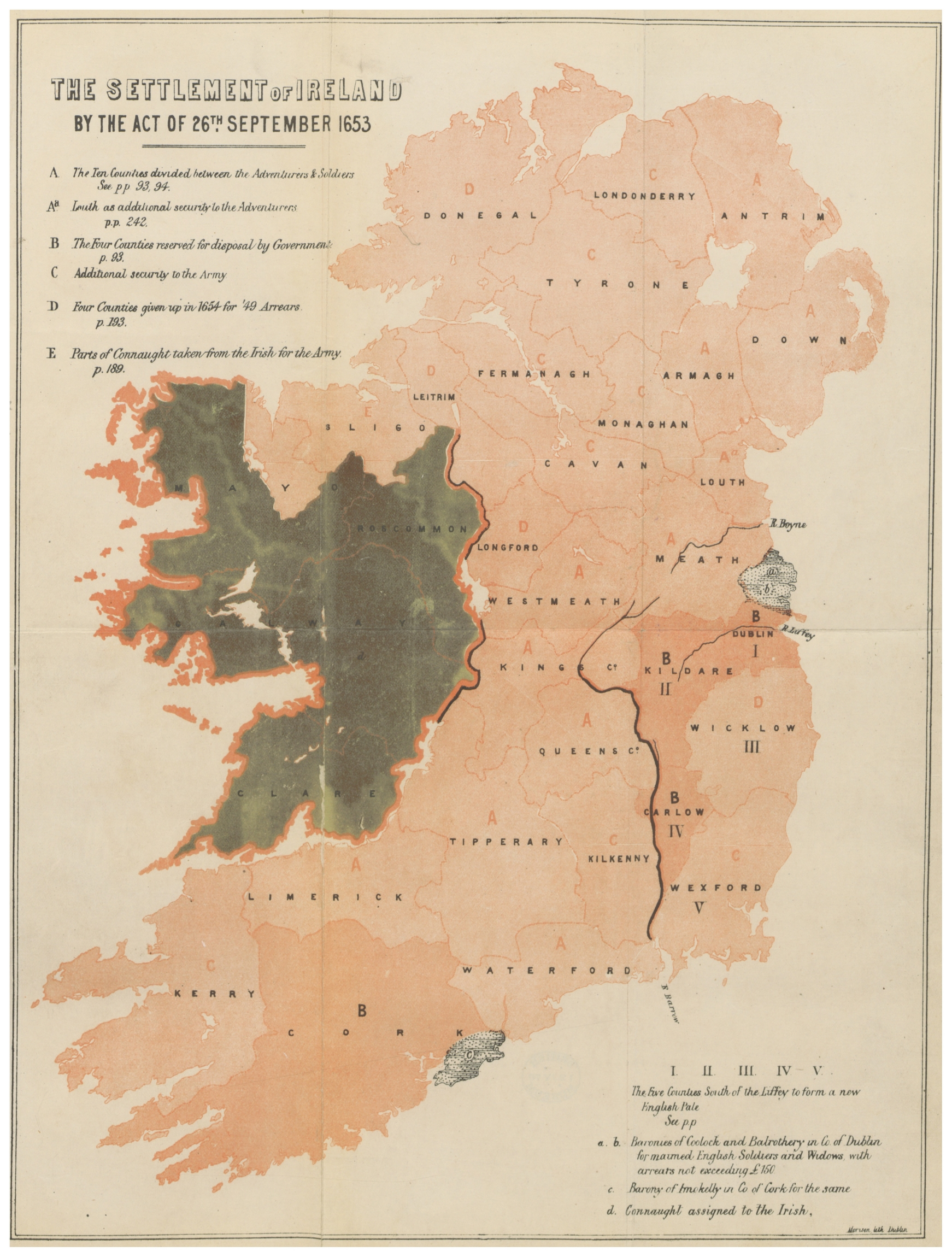
After Cromwell's victory, huge areas of land were confiscated and the Irish Catholics were banished to the lands of Connacht.

The English Parliament imposed an extremely harsh settlement on the Irish population, driven by antipathy to the Catholic religion, and to punish Irish Catholics for the rebellion of 1641. Also, Parliament needed to raise money to pay the army and to provide land to those who had subsidised the war under the Adventurers Act back in 1640.

Under the 1640 Adventurers Act, lenders were paid in confiscated estates, while Parliamentarian soldiers who served there were often compensated with land rather than wages. Although many of these simply sold their grants, the net result was the percentage of land owned by Irish Catholics fell from 60% in 1641 to 20% by the 1660 Stuart Restoration. Thereafter, Catholics were barred from most public office, although not from the Irish Parliament.

== Historical debate ==
The Parliamentarian campaign in Ireland was the most ruthless of the Civil War period. In particular, Cromwell's actions at Drogheda and Wexford earned him a reputation for cruelty.

Cromwell's critics point to his response to a plea by Catholic Bishops to the Irish Catholic people to resist him in which he states that although his intention was not to "massacre, banish and destroy the Catholic inhabitants", if they did resist "I hope to be free from the misery and desolation, blood and ruin that shall befall them, and shall rejoice to exercise the utmost severity against them". (Note: The wording of this version is taken from a London edition, Thomas Carlyle notes that another contemporary version copied from the original Cork edition, ends with the phrase "and shall rejoice to act severity against them" and that he states "is probably the true reading" Carlyle 2010, p. 132.)

Despite attempts by some to argue what happened at Drogheda was not unusual by the standards of 17th century siege warfare, this has been largely rejected by other scholars. One historian argues "the Drogheda massacre does stand out for its mercilessness,...ruthlessness and calculation, for its combination of hot- and cold-bloodiness". Moreover, other critics point out that at the time the killings at Drogheda and Wexford were considered atrocities. They cite such sources as Edmund Ludlow, the Parliamentarian commander in Ireland after Ireton's death, who wrote that the tactics used by Cromwell at Drogheda showed "extraordinary severity".

In 1641–42 Irish insurgents in Ulster killed some 4,000 Protestant settlers who had settled on land confiscated from their former Catholic owners. These events were magnified in Protestant propaganda as an attempt by Irish Catholics to exterminate the English Protestant settlers in Ireland. In turn, this was used as justification by English Parliamentary and Scottish Covenant forces to take vengeance on the Irish Catholic population. A Parliamentary tract of 1655 argued that, "the whole Irish nation, consisting of gentry, clergy and commonality are engaged as one nation in this quarrel, to root out and extirpate all English Protestants from amongst them".

Atrocities were subsequently committed by all sides. When Murrough O'Brien, the Earl of Inchiquin and Parliamentarian commander in Cork, took Cashel in 1647, he slaughtered the garrison and Catholic clergy there (including Theobald Stapleton), earning the nickname "Murrough of the Burnings". Inchiquin switched allegiances in 1648, becoming a commander of the Royalist forces. After such battles as Dungans Hill and Scarrifholis, English Parliamentarian forces executed thousands of their Irish Catholic prisoners. Similarly, when the Confederate Catholic general Thomas Preston took Maynooth in 1647, he hanged its Catholic defenders as apostates.

Nevertheless, the 1649–1653 campaign remains notorious in Irish popular memory as it was responsible for a huge death toll among the Irish population. The main reason for this was the counter-guerrilla tactics used by such commanders as Henry Ireton, John Hewson and Edmund Ludlow against the Catholic population from 1650, when large areas of the country still resisted the Parliamentary Army. These tactics included the wholesale burning of crops, forced population movement, and killing of civilians. One modern estimate estimated that 200,000 were killed, of which 137,000 were civilians.

In addition, the whole post-war Cromwellian settlement of Ireland has been characterised by historians such as Mark Levene and Alan Axelrod as ethnic cleansing, in that it sought to remove Irish Catholics from the eastern part of the country. Others such as the historical writer Tim Pat Coogan have described the actions of Cromwell and his subordinates as genocide. Colonial studies professor Katie Kane suggested that the invasion was comparable to the Native American genocide, drawing parallels between that event and the English treatment of Irish civilians. The aftermath of the Cromwellian campaign and settlement saw extensive dispossession of landowners who were Catholic, and a huge drop in population. In the event, the much larger number of surviving poorer Catholics were not moved westwards; most of them had to fend for themselves by working for the new landowners.

== Long-term results ==
The Cromwellian conquest completed the British colonisation of Ireland, which was merged into the Commonwealth of England, Scotland and Ireland in 1653–59. It destroyed the native Irish Catholic land-owning classes and replaced them with colonists with a British identity. The bitterness caused by the Cromwellian settlement was a powerful source of Irish nationalism from the 17th century onwards.

After the Stuart Restoration in 1660, Charles II of England restored about a third of the confiscated land to the former landlords in the Act of Settlement 1662, but not all, as he needed political support from former parliamentarians in England. A generation later, during the Glorious Revolution, many of the Irish Catholic landed class tried to reverse the remaining Cromwellian settlement in the Williamite War in Ireland (1689–91), where they fought en masse for the Jacobites. They were defeated once again, and many lost land that had been regranted after 1662. As a result, Irish and English Catholics did not become full political citizens of the British state again until 1829 and were legally barred from buying valuable interests in land until the Papists Act 1778.

== See also ==
- British military history
- Chronology of the Wars of the Three Kingdoms
- History of Ireland (1536–1691)
- Irish Confederate Wars
- Wars of the Three Kingdoms
- "Tuireamh na hÉireann"

== Bibliography ==
- Coyle, Eugene (1999). "Review of "Cromwell: An Honourable Enemy, by Tom Reilly"". History Ireland. 7 (4).
- Carlyle, Thomas (2010), Traill, Henry Duff; Cromwell, Oliver (eds.), The Works of Thomas Carlyle, vol. 2, Cambridge University Press, ISBN 9781108022309
- Fraser, Antonia. Cromwell Our Chief of Men, Panther, St Albans 1975, ISBN 0-586-04206-7
- Ó Siochrú, Mícheál. RTÉ ONE, Cromwell in Ireland Part 2. Broadcast 16 September 2008.
- O'Callaghan, Sean (2000). To Hell or Barbados. Brandon. p. 85. ISBN 978-0-86322-272-6.
- Higman, B. W. (1997). Knight, Franklin W. (ed.). General History of the Caribbean: The slave societies of the Caribbean. Vol. 3 (illustrated ed.). UNESCO. ISBN 978-0-333-65605-1.
- Irish Times staff (12 December 2009). "Remnants of an indentured people". The Irish Times. (subscription required)
- Kenyon, John; Ohlmeyer, Jane, eds. (1998). The Civil Wars. Oxford University Press. ISBN 0-19-866222-X.
- Levene, Mark (2005). Genocide in the Age of the Nation State. Vol. 2: The Rise of the West and Coming Genocide. I. B. Tauris. ISBN 978-1-84511-057-4.
- Lenihan, Padraig, Confederate Catholics at War, Cork 2001. ISBN 1-85918-244-5
- O'Siochru, Micheal (2008). God's Executioner- Oliver Cromwell and the Conquest of Ireland. Faber & Faber. ISBN 978-0571218462.
- Morrill, John (December 2003). "Rewriting Cromwell: A Case of Deafening Silences". Canadian Journal of History. 19.
- Reilly, Tom. Cromwell, an Honourable Enemy, Dingle 1999, ISBN 0-86322-250-1
- Scott-Wheeler, James, Cromwell in Ireland, Dublin 1999, ISBN 978-0-7171-2884-6
