= Coote baronets of Castle Cuffe (1621) =

Baronetcy in Ireland

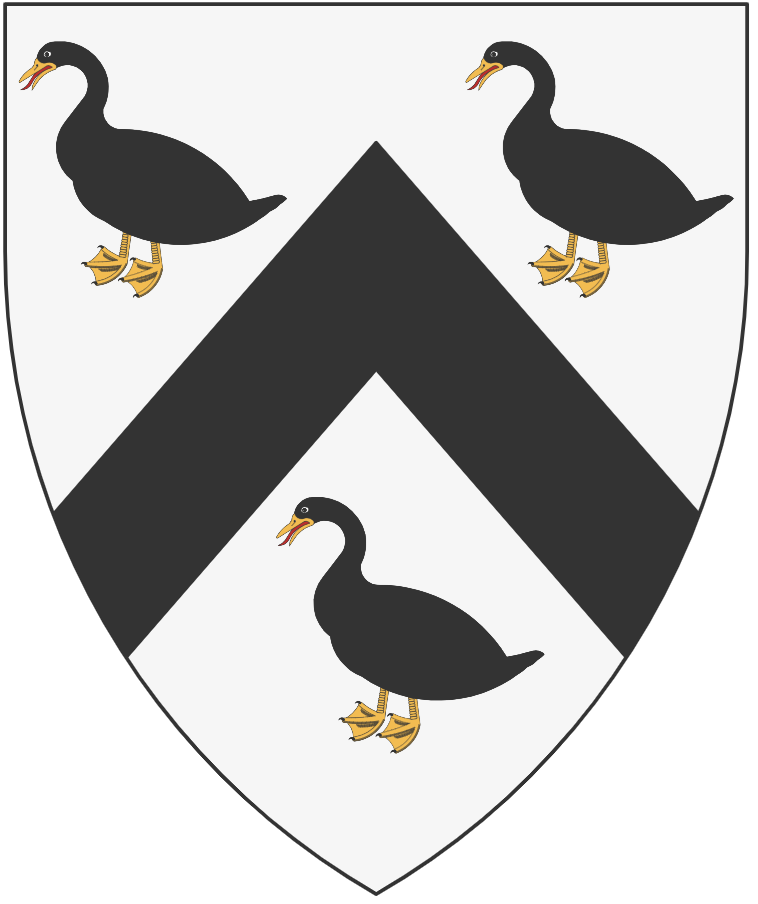
Arms of Coote of Castle Cuffe: Argent, a chevron sable between three coots close proper

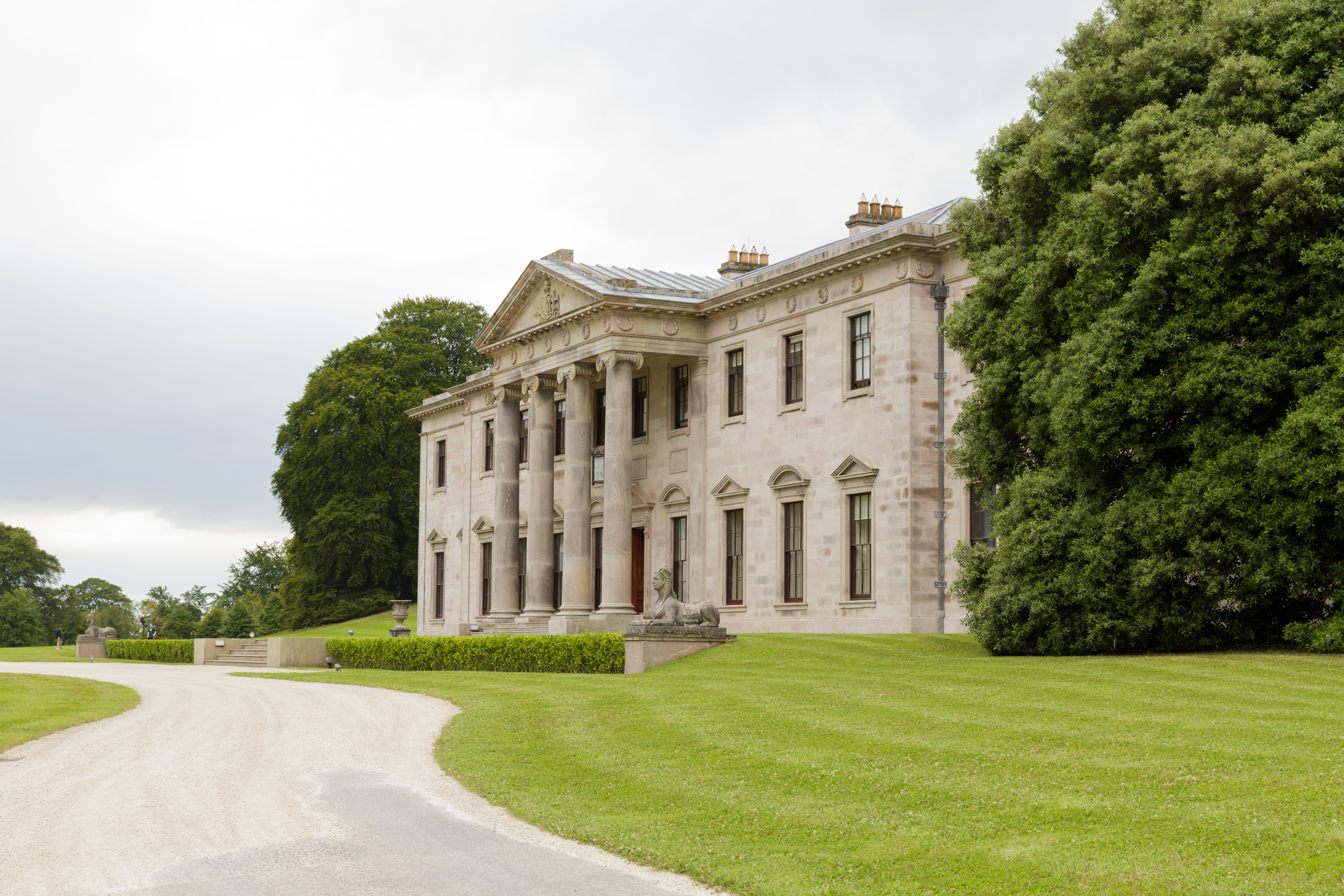
Ballyfin House, now a hotel, 2015 photograph

The Coote baronetcy, of Castle Cuffe in the Queen's County, was created in the Baronetage of Ireland on 2 April 1621 for Charles Coote, in Ireland as a soldier, knighted in 1616 and Vice President of Connaught in 1620.

He was succeeded by his eldest son, Charles, the 2nd Baronet, who took part in the Cromwellian conquest of Ireland. He was raised to the Peerage of Ireland as Baron Coote, of Castle Cuffe in the Queen's County, Viscount Coote, of Castle Coote in the County of Roscommon, and Earl of Mountrath, in the Queen's County, on 6 September 1660. The titles descended from father to son until the death of Charles, the 4th Earl, in 1715. The latter's two brothers, Henry, the 5th Earl, and Algernon, the 6th Earl, both succeeded in the titles. The 6th Earl was succeeded by his son, Charles, the 7th Earl. In 1800, Charles was created Baron Castle Coote, in the County of Roscommon, in the Peerage of Ireland, with special remainder to his kinsman Charles Coote.

The earldom, viscountcy and barony of Coote became extinct on the 7th Earl's death in 1802, leaving no legitimate male issue. He was succeeded in the barony of Castle Coote (according to the special remainder) by Charles Coote, the 2nd Baron: see Baron Castle Coote for further history of this title. The Coote baronetcy was passed on to a kinsman, Charles Henry Coote, who became the 9th Baronet. Two of the 9th Baronet's sons, Charles, the 10th Baronet, and Algernon, the 11th Baronet, who was High Sheriff of Queen's County in 1897, succeeded in the title.

Ballyfin House, near Mountrath, County Laois, built in the 1820s by the 9th Baronet, became the family seat. The title is held as of 2026 by the 16th Baronet.

== Portrait gallery ==
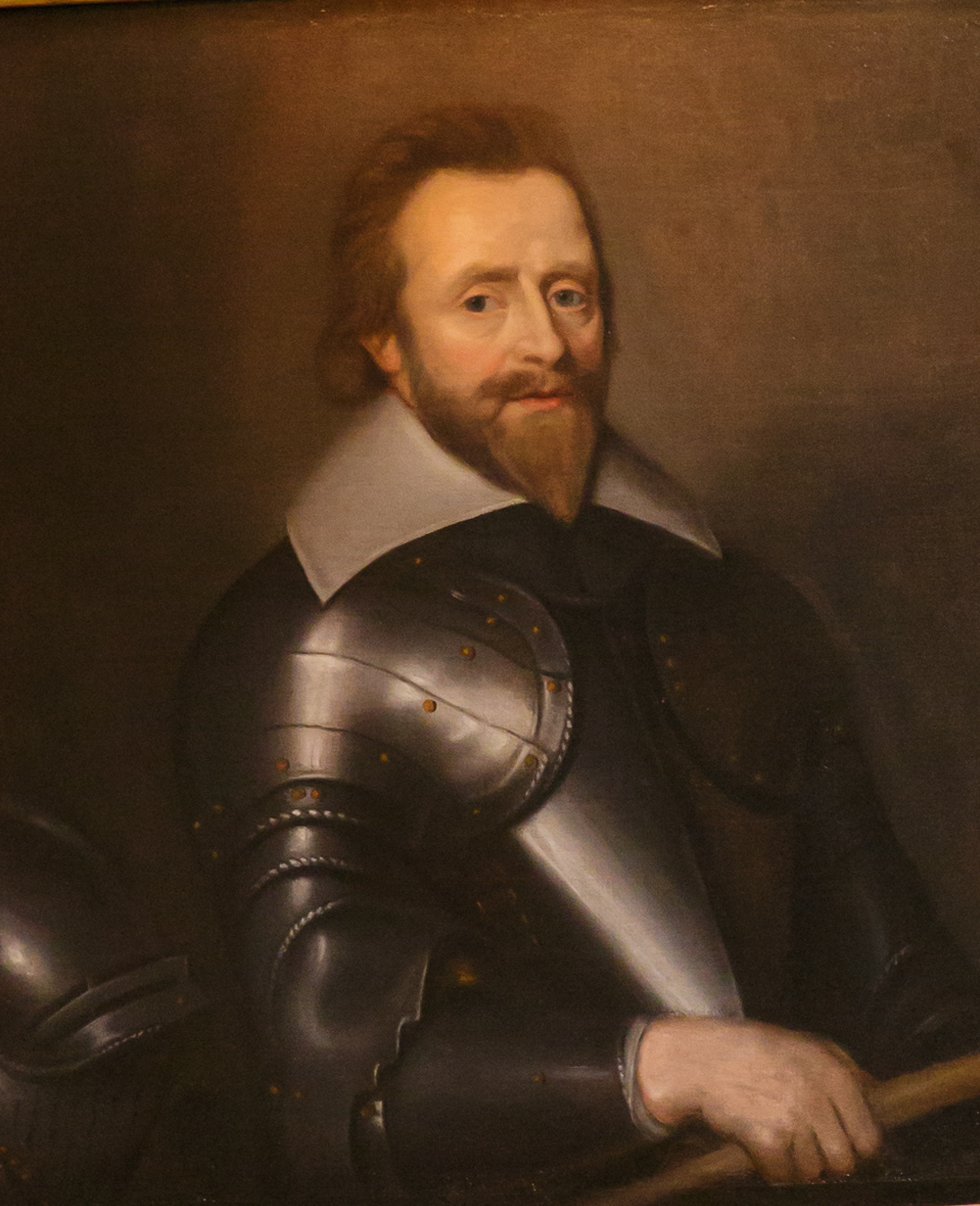
Circle of Cornelius Johnson, Sir Charles Coote, 1st Baronet, c. 1630

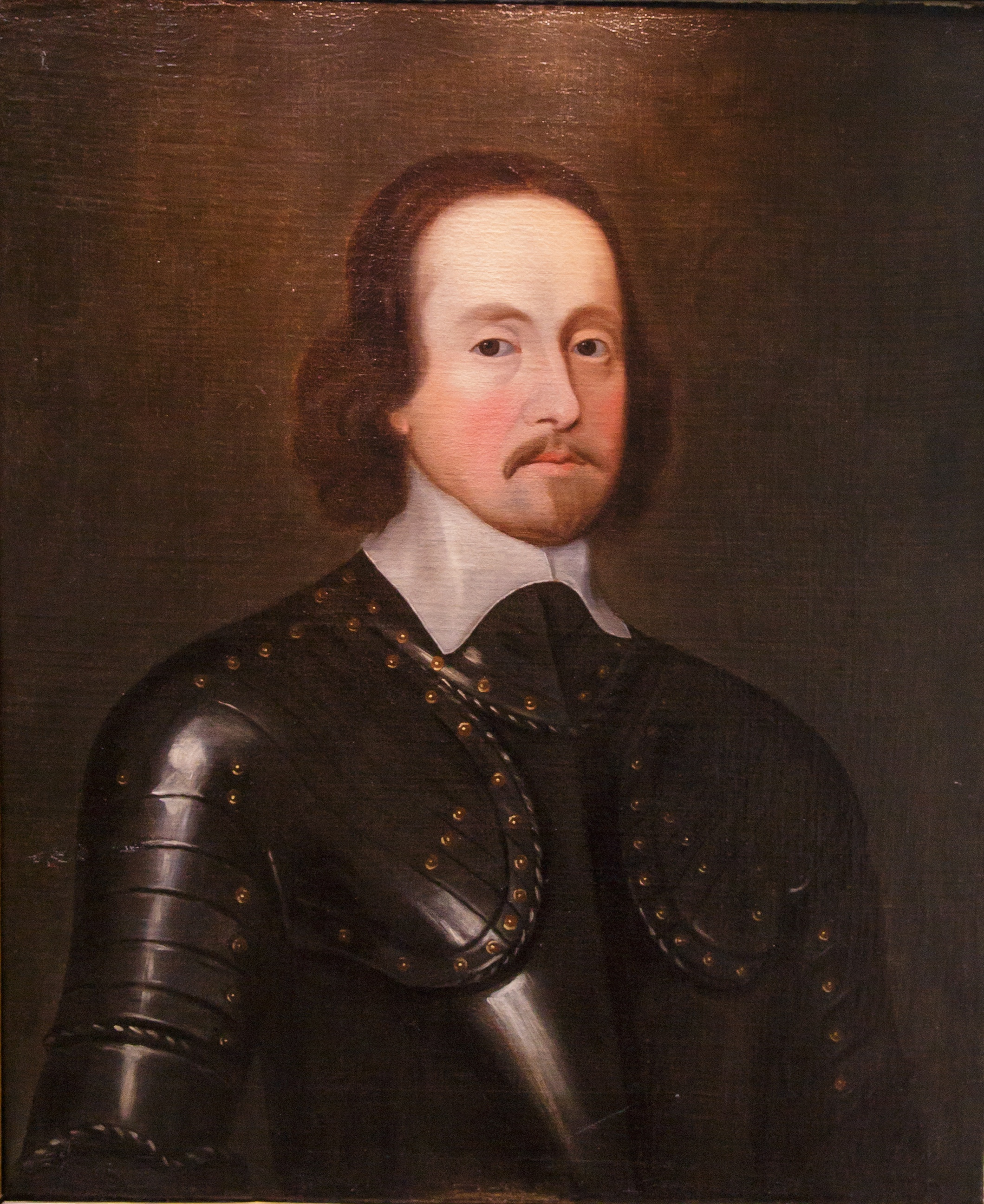
Circle of William Dobson, Sir Charles Coote, 2nd Baronet, c. 1642, before he was ennobled as the 1st Earl of Mountrath

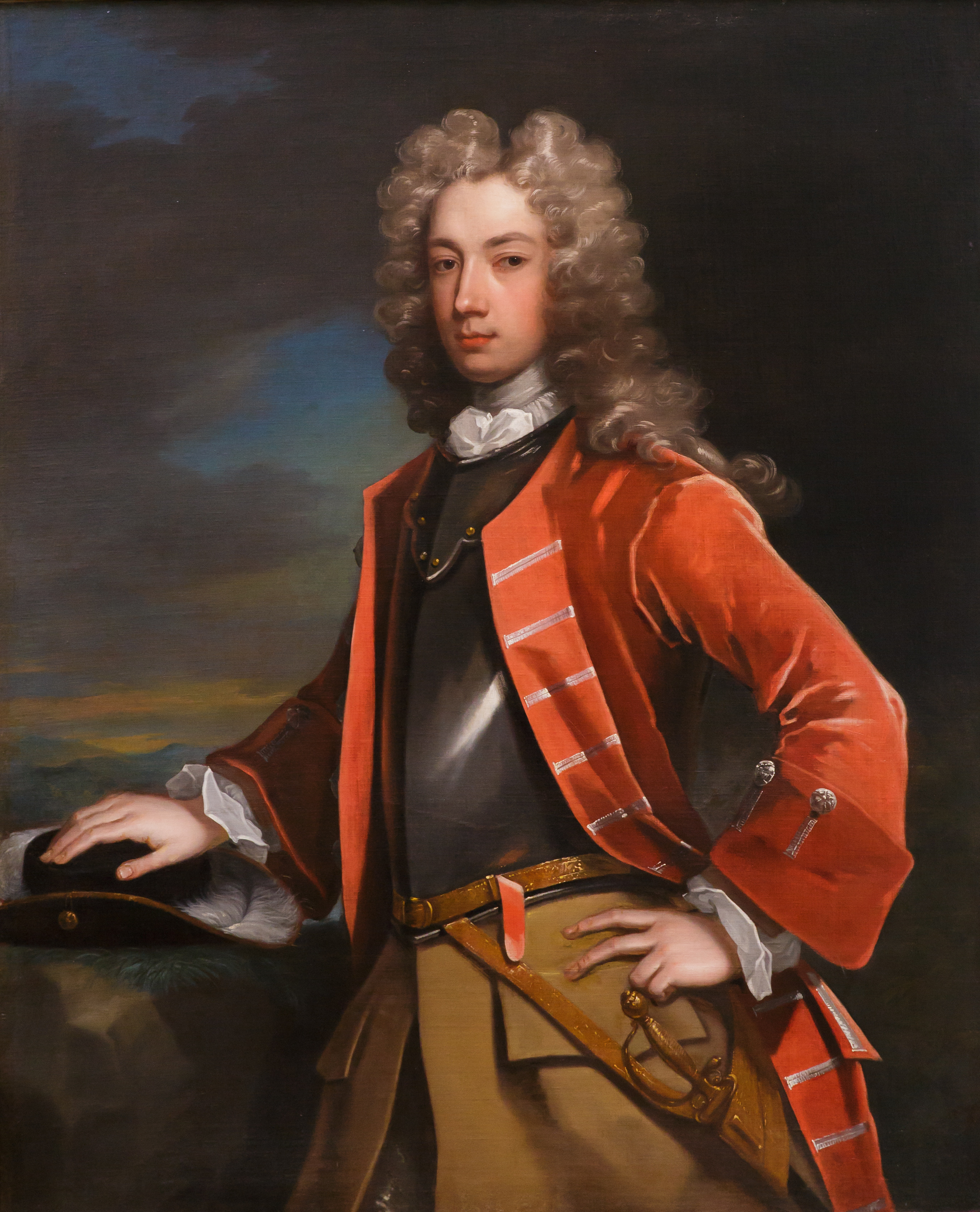
Charles Jervas, Charles Coote, 4th Earl of Mountrath, c. 1710

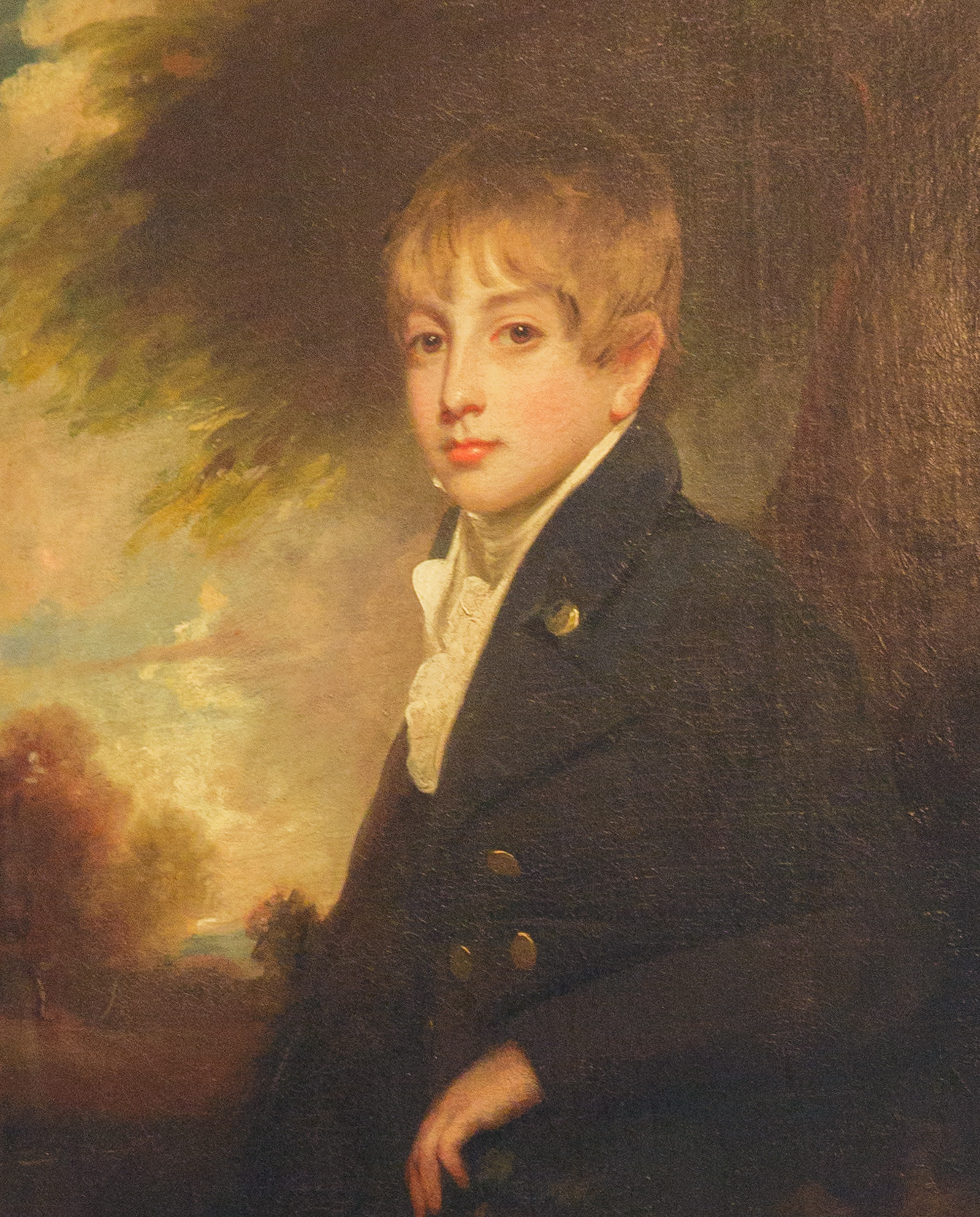
John Hoppner, Sir Charles Henry Coote, 9th Baronet, c. 1803

== Coote baronets, of Castle Cuffe (1621) ==
- Sir Charles Coote, 1st Baronet (died 1642)
- Sir Charles Coote, 2nd Baronet (c. 1610–1661) (created Earl of Mountrath in 1660)

== Earls of Mountrath (1660) ==
- Charles Coote, 1st Earl of Mountrath (c. 1610–1661)
- Charles Coote, 2nd Earl of Mountrath (c.1630–1672)
- Charles Coote, 3rd Earl of Mountrath (c.1655–1709)
- Charles Coote, 4th Earl of Mountrath (c.1680–1715)
- Henry Coote, 5th Earl of Mountrath (1684–1720)
- Algernon Coote, 6th Earl of Mountrath (1689–1744)
- Charles Henry Coote, 7th Earl of Mountrath (1725–1802) (created Baron Castle Coote in 1800)

== Coote baronets, of Castle Cuffe (1621; reverted) ==
- Sir Charles Henry Coote, 9th Baronet (1792–1864)
- Sir Charles Henry Coote, 10th Baronet (1815–1895)
- Sir Algernon Coote, 11th Baronet (1817–1899) (Sheriff of Queen's County in 1897)
- Sir Algernon Charles Plumptre Coote, 12th Baronet (1847–1920)
- Sir Ralph Algernon Coote, 13th Baronet (1874–1941)
- Sir John Ralph Coote, 14th Baronet (1905–1978)
- Sir Christopher John Coote, 15th Baronet (1928–2016)
- Sir Nicholas Patrick Coote, 16th Baronet (born 1953)

The heir apparent is the present holder's only son, Rory Alasdair Coote (born 1987).

== Extended family ==
Sir Eyre Coote, great-uncle of the ninth Baronet, was a soldier. Robert Coote, younger son of the 9th Baronet, was an admiral in the Royal Navy. His son Stanley Victor Coote (1862–1925) was High Sheriff of Roscommon in 1900. John Oldham Coote (1921–1993), grandson of Cecil Henry Coote, younger son of the 11th Baronet, was a captain in the Royal Navy. Roderic Coote, son of Commander Bernard Trotter Coote, younger son of the 12th Baronet, was Bishop of Gambia and the Rio Pongas, Bishop of Fulham, and finally of Colchester.
