= Custos Rotulorum of Queen's County =

The Custos Rotulorum of Queen's County was the highest civil officer in Queen's County, Ireland (now County Laois). The position was later combined with that of Lord Lieutenant of Queen's County.

== Incumbents ==
- 1634–?1642 Sir Charles Coote, 1st Baronet (died 1642)
- 1769–1822 Charles Moore, 1st Marquess of Drogheda
- 1823–1845 William Wellesley-Pole, 3rd Earl of Mornington (died 1845)

For later custodes rotulorum, see Lord Lieutenant of Queen's County
