= Paul Dodd (mayor) =

Paul Dodd, was Mayor of Galway, from 1656 to 1657.

Dodd was sworn into office in September 1656, having been a sheriff under the previous mayor, Humphrey Hurd. He seized a house belonging to John Bodkin, possibly the same man who was Mayor 1639–40, and leased other property he had confiscated from the townspeople. According to William Henry, the new rulers of Galway were crude, lower-class English, who "After burning the costly timberwork in one house, they simply moved into the next house leaving them with a poisoning stench of excrement and filth, that it was almost impossible to enter." His descendants still live in the town.

Civic offices
Preceded by Humphrey Hurd	Mayor of Galway; 1656–1657	Succeeded by Gabriel King (Mayor)
