= Francis Slingsby =

English-born soldier

Sir Francis Slingsby (c. 1569–1651) was an English-born soldier who settled in Ireland following service as an officer during the Nine Years' War.

The ninth and youngest son of apparently recusant Yorkshire Catholic parents, Francis and Mary (née Percy) Slingsby, the younger Francis married Elizabeth Cuffe shortly after arriving in Kilmallock, County Limerick. She was a daughter of Hugh Cuffe, an early settler in the Munster Plantation who held estates in northern County Cork. Slingsby acquired lands at Kilmore through his marriage, and his family were established as prominent figures in Munster.

He sat as MP for Bandonbridge in the Parliament of Ireland from 1639 to 1645.

== Bibliography ==
- MacCarthy-Morrogh, Michael. The Munster Plantation: English Migration to Southern Ireland, 1583-1641. Clarendon Press, 1986.
- Murphy, Noel. Francis Slingsby: Elizabethan Adventurer 1569 – 1651. Family Histories at Limerick City Library.
