= Sir Algernon Coote, 11th Baronet =

Irish cricketer

Personal information
- Full name: Algernon Coote
- Born: 29 September 1817; Ballyfin, Ireland
- Died: 20 November 1899 (aged 82); Ballyfin, Ireland
- Batting: Unknown
- Relatives: Charles Coote (nephew)

Domestic team information
- Years: Team
- 1837–1840: Oxford University

Career statistics
Competition	First-class
Matches	12
Runs scored	156
Batting average	7.42
100s/50s	–/–
Top score	34*
Catches/stumpings	–/–
- Source: Cricinfo, 5 February 2020

Sir Algernon Coote, 11th Baronet (29 September 1817 – 20 November 1899) was an Irish first-class cricketer and clergyman.

The son of Sir Charles Coote and Caroline Elizabeth Whaley, he was born at Ballyfin in Ireland. He was educated in England at Eton College, before going up to Brasenose College, Oxford. While studying at Oxford, he played first-class cricket for Oxford University against the Marylebone Cricket Club (MCC) at Oxford in 1837. In the same season he also played for the Gentlemen in the Gentlemen v Players fixture at Lord's. He featured for Oxford on nine further occasions to 1840, including playing for a combined Oxford and Cambridge Universities team against the MCC in 1839. In ten matches for Oxford, he scored 129 runs at an average of 7.16, with a high score of 34 not out.

After graduating from Oxford, he took holy orders in the Church of England. Coote was the vicar of Nonington in Kent from 1856–71. He married twice, firstly to Cecilia Matilda Plumptre from 1847 to her death in 1878, with the couple having six children. Following Cecilia's death, he married Constance Headlam in 1879, with the couple having three children. Coote succeeded his elder brother, Charles, as the 11th Baronet upon his death in November 1895. He was the High Sheriff of Queen's County in 1897. Coote died at Ballyfin in November 1899, at which point he was succeeded as the 12th Baronet by his son, Sir Algernon Charles Plumptre Coote. His nephew, Charles Coote, also played first-class cricket.

Baronetage of Ireland
Preceded by Charles Coote	Baronet (of Castle Cuffe); 1895–1899	Succeeded by Algernon Coote
