= Tuireamh na hÉireann =

Poem in Irish, from the 17th century

- Ireland's Lament
- by Seán Ó Conaill
- Original title: Tuireaḋ na h-Eireann
- Translator: Michael Clarke
- Written: c. 1655–59
- Country: Ireland
- Language: Early Modern Irish
- Subject: History of Ireland
- Genre(s): History, lament
- Media type: Manuscript
- Lines: 496
- Metre: Caoineadh

"Tuireamh na hÉireann" ([ˈt̪ˠɪɾʲəw n̪ˠə ˈheːɾʲən̪ˠ], "Lament for Ireland", archaic spelling Tuireaḋ na h-Eireann), also called "Aiste Sheáin Uí Chonaill" ("Seán Ó Conaill's Essay") is an Irish-language poem of the mid-17th century. The poem gives a history of Ireland from the Great Flood to the Cromwellian war. Its composition is dated to 1655–59, and it was written by Seán Ó Conaill of the Iveragh Peninsula, a dependent of MacCarthy Mór. Some accounts described him as Catholic Bishop of Ardfert, but there is no evidence that he ever held that office.

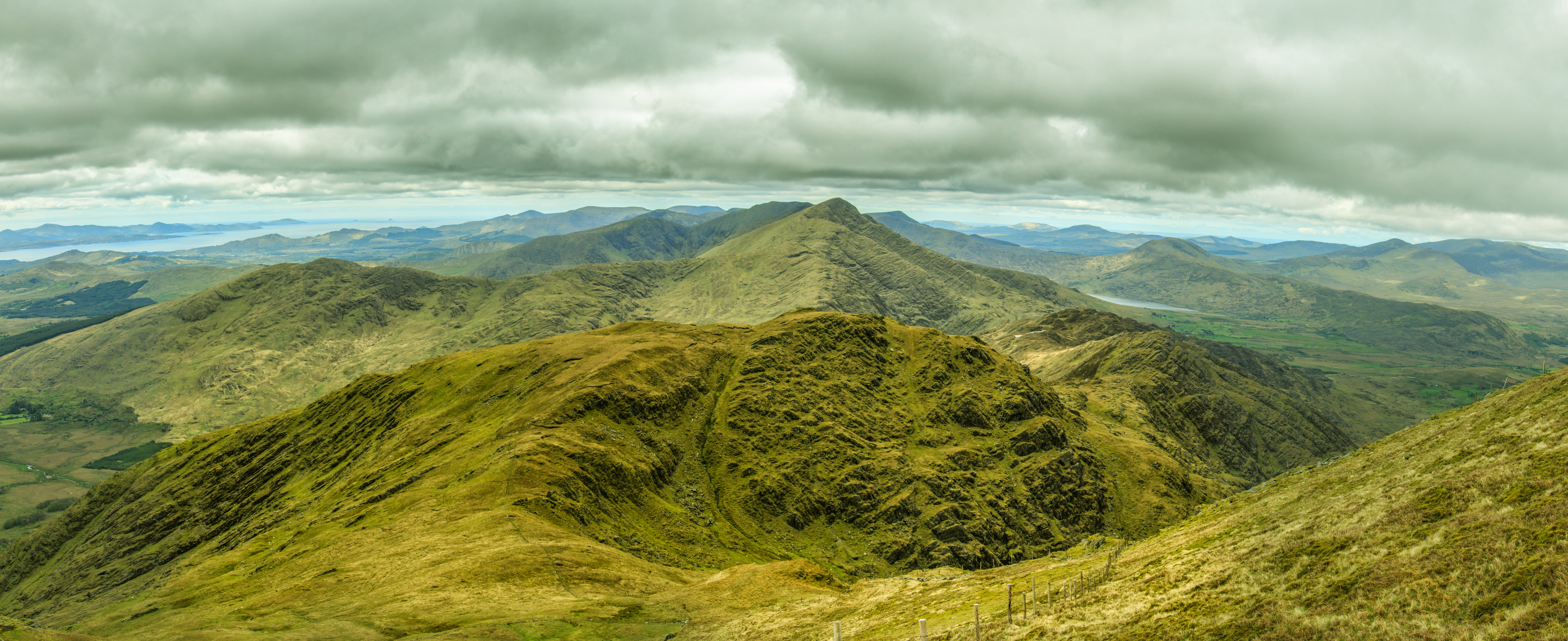
Landscape of the Iveragh Peninsula, Ó Conaill's homeland

== Background ==
Piaras Béaslaí considered "Tuireamh na hÉireann" to be an inferior imitation of "An Síogaí Rómhánach."

== Text ==
The hour I reflect on the nobles of Erin
The devastation of the country, and the want of the clergy
The destruction of the people, and the melting of her wealth,
My heart in my breast is tearing.

— "Tuireamh na hÉireann," opening lines, translated by Martin A. O'Brennan

The poem refers to the Cromwellian conquest as ‘an cogadh do chríochnaigh Éire’ (the war that finished Ireland).

== Legacy ==
On "Tuireamh na hÉireann," Vincent Morley wrote that it was "arguably one of the most important works ever written in Ireland. Composed in simple metre, easily understandable and capable of being learned by heart, this poem supplied an understanding of Irish history for the Catholic majority (monoglot speakers of Irish who could neither read nor write for the next two hundred years)." It was significantly shorter and easier to understand than Foras Feasa ar Éirinn (c. 1634). In the mid-18th century, Fr Francis O'Sullivan noted that the poem was "repeated and kept in memory on account of the great knowledge of antiquity comprehended in it."

== Translation ==
The first English translation was published by Michael Clarke (1750–1847) in 1827.

Cecile O’Rahilly translated it in Five Seventeenth Century Political Poems (1946).
