= Gabriel King (mayor) =

Gabriel King, was Mayor of Galway in 1657–58.

King oversaw the demolition of the abbey of St. Francis, which had been founded in the 13th century. He was one of the commissioners appointed to determine ownership of lands in County Galway and County Mayo. He was married to a daughter of Anthony Martin, Bishop of Meath (died 1649).

Civic offices
Preceded by Paul Dodd	Mayor of Galway; 1657–1658	Succeeded by Charles Coote, 1st Earl of Mountrath
