= Charles Coote (cricketer) =

Irish cricketer

Personal information
- Full name: Charles Purdon Coote
- Born: 8 August 1847; Weymouth, Dorset, England
- Died: 20 September 1893 (aged 46); Ballyclogh, Ireland
- Height: 6 ft 1 in (1.85 m)
- Batting: Right-handed
- Relatives: Sir Algernon Coote (uncle)

Domestic team information
- Years: Team
- 1869–1874: Marylebone Cricket Club

Career statistics
| Competition | First-class |
|---|---|
| Matches | 13 |
| Runs scored | 192 |
| Batting average | 9.14 |
| 100s/50s | –/– |
| Top score | 35 |
| Catches/stumpings | 5/– |
- Source: Cricinfo, 29 April 2021

Charles Purdon Coote JP DL (8 August 1847 – 20 September 1893) was an Irish first-class cricketer.

The son of Charles Purdon Coote and Lydia Lucy Wingfield Digby, he was born in England at Weymouth in August 1847. He was educated in England at Harrow School, before going up to Trinity College Dublin. He played first-class cricket in England for the Marylebone Cricket Club (MCC) between 1869 and 1874, making 13 appearances. Described by Scores and Biographies as "a good batsman", he scored 192 runs in his 13 matches, averaging 9.14 and with a highest score of 25. His one appearance for Ireland came in a minor match in 1871 against the MCC, staged to raise the profile of cricket in Ireland, with Coote making scores of 1 and 0 with the MCC winning the match by a heavy margin.

Coote was for many years a director with the Great Southern and Western Railway. He was a Gentleman Usher for the Lord Lieutenants of Ireland from 1886 to 1892, serving Lords Londonderry and Zetland at Dublin Castle. He was a deputy lieutenant and justice of the peace for County Cork. Coote died at Ballyclogh in County Cork in September 1893. His uncle was Sir Algernon Coote, who was also a first-class cricketer.
