= Lisnagarvey =

Townland in County Antrim, Northern Ireland

Coordinates: 54.476°N 6.036°W

Lisnagarvey or Lisnagarvy (from Irish Lios na gCearrbhach, meaning 'fort of the gamester') is a townland in County Antrim, Northern Ireland.

The townland was named after an earthen ringfort (lios), which was in the area of present-day "Fort Hill" in Lisburn. Today, most of the north-eastern part of Lisburn is within Lisnagarvey townland. Its eastern boundary is the River Lagan, its southern boundary is Governor's Road and its western boundary is Antrim Street/Antrim Road. It includes Wallace Park, Christ Church Cathedral and Thompson House Hospital.

The name has been used for Lisnagarvey High School, Lisnagarvey Hockey Club and Lisnagarvey transmitting station, although none of these are within the townland itself. When David Trimble, the former First Minister, was created a peer, he took the title Baron Trimble, of Lisnagarvey in the County of Antrim.

Lisnagarvey was the site of a defeat of the mostly Scottish Royalists at the hands of the Parliamentarians in 1649.
