= Charles Coote, 3rd Earl of Mountrath =

Anglo-Irish peer and official

Charles Coote, 3rd Earl of Mountrath (c.1655 – 29 May 1709) was an Anglo-Irish peer and official.

Coote was the son of Charles Coote, 2nd Earl of Mountrath and Alice Meredyth, and in 1672 he succeeded to his father's peerage. In 1689 during the Williamite War in Ireland, Coote's estate, worth £2,250 a year in rent, was sequestered by the Patriot Parliament loyal to James II of England. Following the war, he was granted the estate of Christopher Fleming, 17th Baron Slane, who had been attainted. A favourite of William III of England, in 1694 he was chosen to carry the Banner of the Kingdom of Ireland at the funeral of Queen Mary.

In July 1695, Coote was appointed to the Privy Council of Ireland as an ally of Henry Capell, 1st Baron Capell of Tewkesbury. From 1696 to 1697 he was one of the Lords Justices of Ireland. He was active in the Irish House of Lords and was a member of several important committees, notably those proposing anti-Roman Catholic measures.

He married Lady Isabella Dormer, youngest daughter and coheiress of Charles Dormer, 2nd Earl of Carnarvon. They had three sons, Charles, Henry and Algernon.

Peerage of Ireland
Preceded by Charles Coote	Earl of Mountrath; 1672–1709	Succeeded by Charles Coote
