= Charles Coote, 2nd Earl of Mountrath =

Anglo-Irish politician and peer

Charles Coote, 2nd Earl of Mountrath (c.1630 – 30 August 1672) was an Anglo-Irish politician and peer.

Coote was the son of Charles Coote, 1st Earl of Mountrath and Mary Ruish, daughter of Sir Francis Ruish. He was knighted in 1660. Between April and December 1661 he briefly served as the Member of Parliament for County Roscommon in the Irish House of Commons, before inheriting his father's title and assuming his seat in the Irish House of Lords. In 1662 Coote was granted a general pardon by Charles II of England for his support of The Protectorate. In 1662 he received a commission as a captain of foot in the Irish Army.

Coote married Alice Meredyth, daughter of Sir Robert Meredyth, in June 1653. He was succeeded in his title by his only son, Charles Coote. His daughter, Anne, married Murrough Boyle, 1st Viscount Blesington.

Parliament of Ireland
Preceded by James King; Protectorate Parliament	Member of Parliament for County Roscommon; 1661; With: Richard Jones	Succeeded by George Lane; Richard Jones
Peerage of Ireland
Preceded by Charles Coote	Earl of Mountrath; 1661–1672	Succeeded by Charles Coote
