= Sir Charles Coote, 1st Baronet =

Irish baronet (1581–1642)

Charles Coote
- Baronet Coote of Castle Cuffe
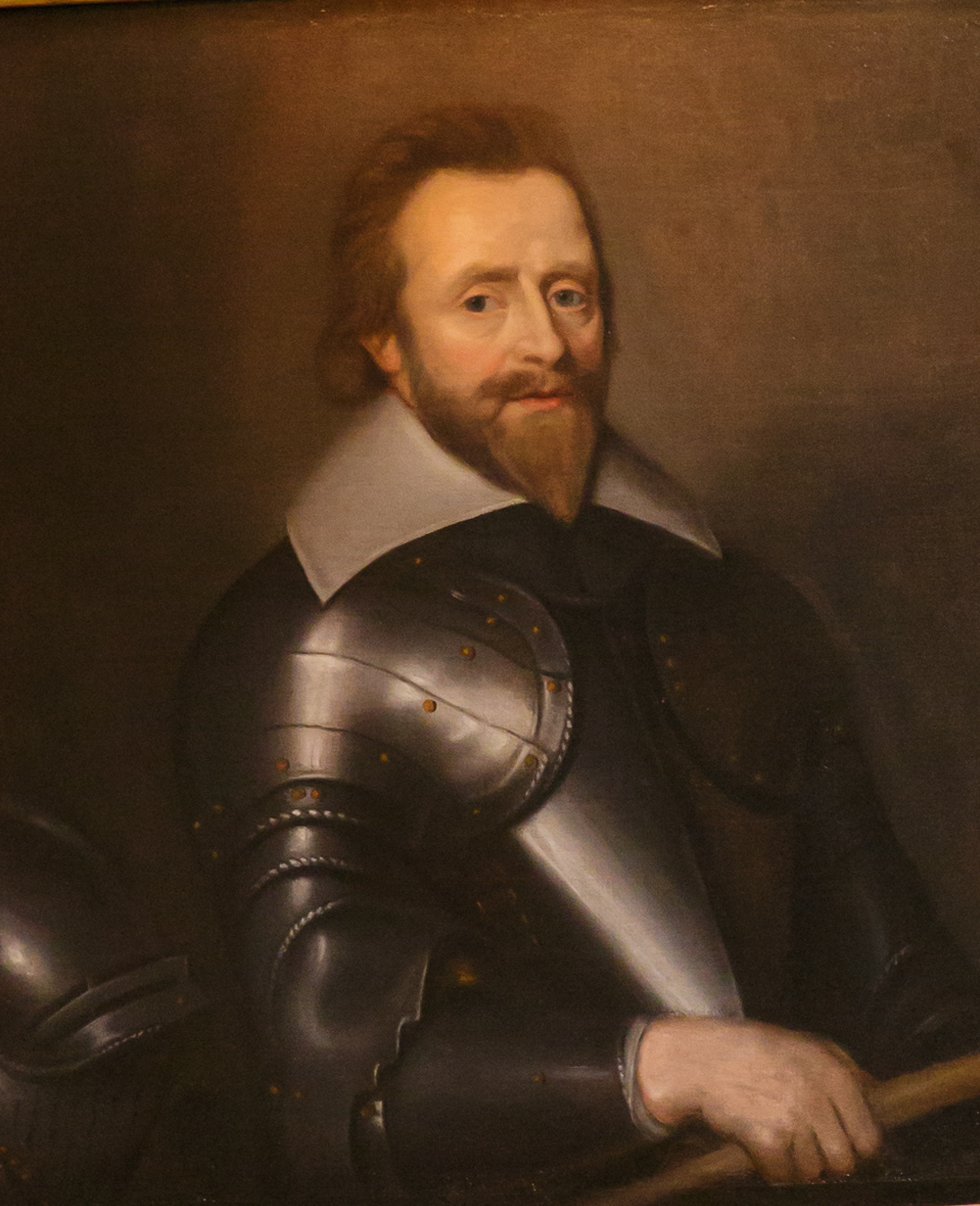
- Detail from the portrait below
- Tenure: 1621–1642
- Successor: Charles, 1st Earl of Mountrath
- Born: 1581
- Died: 7 May 1642 (aged 60–61)
- Spouse: Dorothea Cuffe
- Issue Detail: Charles & others
- Father: Nicholas Coote
- Mother: Eleanor Stanhope

Sir Charles Coote, 1st Baronet (1581–1642), of Castle Cuffe in Queen's County, was an English soldier, administrator and landowner who lived in Ireland. He fought in the Siege of Kinsale (1601–1602) in the Nine Years' War and led the decisive cavalry charge at the Battle of Kilrush(1642) of the Irish Confederate Wars.

== Birth and origins ==
Charles was born in England, the first son of Sir Nicholas Coote and his second wife, Eleanor Stanhope. (Note: Cokayne, however, maintained Coote was the son of his father's first wife, Anne Cooper, a daughter of Thomas Cooper of Thurgarton, in Norfolk.) His father was a knight from Blo' Norton in Norfolk. His mother, Eleanor, was a daughter of Sir Michael Stanhope and sister of John Stanhope, 1st Baron Stanhope (died 1621), who furthered Charles's early career.

== Early life ==
In 1600 Coote moved to Ireland as a captain of a company of 100 men in an infantry regiment in the army of Lord Mountjoy, lord deputy of Ireland, where he fought in the last few years of the Nine Years War. When the 4th Spanish Armada took place in Southern Ireland, he was at the Siege of Kinsale in 1601–1602, which ultimately led to Hugh O'Neill's defeat.

In 1605 Coote was appointed Provost-Marshal of Connaught for life and in 1613 was appointed to the office of General Collector and Receiver of the King's composition money for Connaught, also for life. He was knighted in 1616 by Oliver St John, lord deputy of Ireland.

== Marriage and children ==
Before 1617 Coote married Dorothea, younger daughter and coheir of Hugh Cuffe of Cuffe's Wood, County Cork.

Charles and Dorothea had five children, four sons:

1. Charles, who would be created Earl of Mountrath.
2. Chidley
3. Richard, became Baron Coote of Coloony and was father of Richard Coote, 1st Earl of Bellomont
4. Thomas (died 1671) of Cootehill in County Cavan

—and one daughter

1. Laetitia, married Sir Francis Hamilton, 1st Baronet, of Killock, also called of Killeshandra, County Cavan

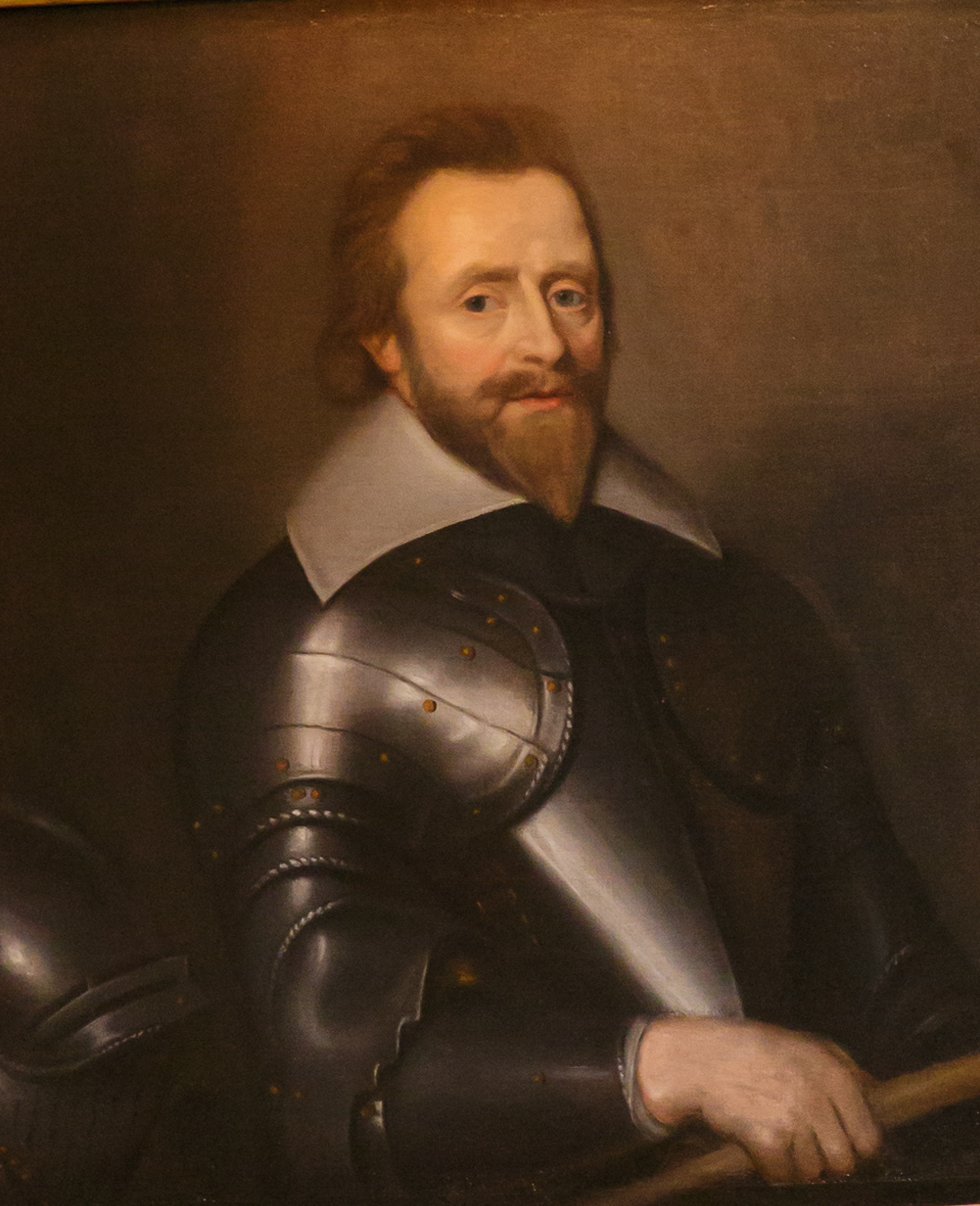
Circle of Cornelius Johnson, Sir Charles Coote, 1st Baronet, ca. 1630

== Honours ==
In 1620 Coote was promoted vice-president of Connaught. On 2 April 1621 he was made a baronet (of Castle Cuffe in Queen's County). He became a substantial landowner and served as a commissioner to examine and contest Irish land titles. In 1634 he was appointed Custos Rotulorum of Queen's County, again for life. He was elected Member of Parliament (M.P.) in the 2nd Irish Parliament of King Charles I for Queen's County in 1640.

== Irish rebellion and death ==
When the Irish Uprising of 1641 began, Coote was appointed governor of Dublin and told to raise a regiment. Enraged by Irish Catholic atrocities, such as the Portadown Massacre, against Protestants, Coote and his soldiers retaliated with massacres of Catholics and made no distinction between Gaels and the traditionally Royalist Old English Catholic population of The Pale. Coote then marched south to County Wicklow, and marching north in 1642 defeated the rebels at Swords and Kilsallaghan.

In addition, Coote was the driving force behind the death by hanging of Friar Peter O'Higgins, the Dominican Prior of Naas who had been responsible for fearlessly saving Protestant lives during the recent sectarian violence in the district surrounding his monastery. Despite the efforts of James Butler, 12th Earl of Ormond and the many Protestants whom he had rescued to save his life, Fr. O'Higgins was executed at St Stephen's Green on 24 March 1642.

On 10 April 1642, Ormond sent Coote to relieve the beleaguered garrisons at Birr, Burris, and Knocknamease, after which he rejoined Ormond's main force, which defeated the Irish Confederates at the Battle of Kilrush on the 15th. Coote led the decisive cavalry charge. In early May he helped capture the garrisons of Philipstown and Trim, but was killed at Trim on 7 May 1642 while leading a sally against an Irish force trying to surprise the town.

== Legacy ==
On 22 September 1992 Pope John Paul II beatified Fr. Peter O'Higgins as one of the 17 Irish Catholic Martyrs.

== Sources ==
- Armstrong, Robert (October 2009). "Coote, Sir Charles". In McGuire, James; Quinn, James (eds.). Dictionary of Irish Biography (online ed.).
- Bagwell, Richard (1909). Ireland under the Stuarts and under the Interregnum. Vol. II. London: Longmans, Green, and Co. OCLC 458582656. – 1642 to 1660
- Borlase, Edmund; Hyde, Edward (1680). The History of the Execrable Irish Rebellion. London: Robert Clavel. OCLC 1069418781.
- Burke, Bernard (1883). A Genealogical History of the Dormant, Abeyant, Forfeited and Extinct Peerages of the British Empire (New ed.). London: Harrison. OCLC 499232768.
- Clavin, Terry (October 2009). "Higgins, Peter". In McGuire, James; Quinn, James (eds.). Dictionary of Irish Biography (online ed.).
- G. E. C. (1900). Complete Baronetage, 1611 to 1800. Vol. I (1st ed.). Exeter: William Pollard & Co. OCLC 866278985. – 1611 to 1625
- Henderson, Thomas Finlayson (1887). "Coote, Sir Charles (d. 1642)". In Lee, Sidney (ed.). Dictionary of National Biography. Vol. XII. London: Smith, Elder, & Co. p. 156. OCLC 1225969731.
- House of Commons (1878). Return. Members of Parliament – Part II. Parliaments of Great Britain, 1705–1796. Parliaments of the United Kingdom, 1801–1874. Parliaments and Conventions of the Estates of Scotland, 1357–1707. Parliaments of Ireland, 1599–1800. London: His/Her Majesty's Stationery Office. OCLC 13112546.
- Lenihan, Pádraig (2004). "Coote, Charles, 1st Baronet (d. 1642)". In Matthew, Colin; Harrison, Brian (eds.). Oxford Dictionary of National Biography. Vol. 13. New York: Oxford University Press. pp. 293–294. ISBN 0-19-861363-6.
- Shaw, William Arthur (1906). The Knights of England: A complete record from the earliest time to the present day of the knights of all the orders of chivalry in England, Scotland, and Ireland, and of knights bachelors, incorporating a complete list of knights bachelors dubbed in Ireland. Vol. II. London: Sherratt & Hughes. – Knights bachelors & Index

Baronetage of Ireland
| New creation | Baronet (of Castle Cuffe); 1621–1642 | Succeeded by Charles Coote |
