= Coote baronets =

Set index for Coote baronets

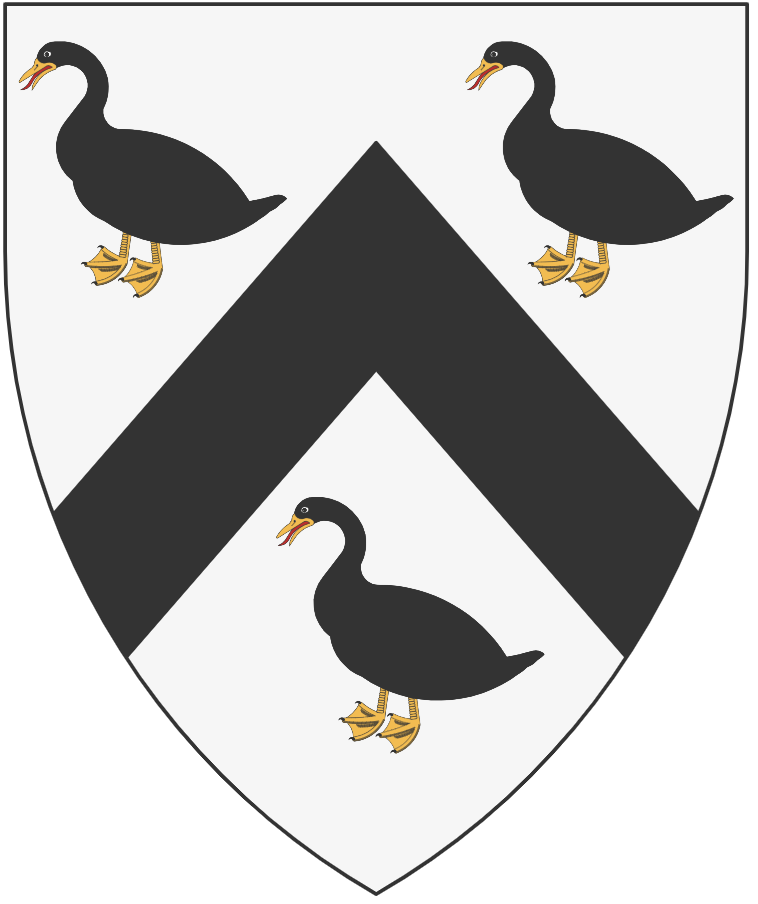
Coat of arms of Coote baronets of Castle Cuffe

There have been two baronetcies created for members of the Coote family. As of 2026 one is extant.

- Coote baronets of Castle Cuffe (1621)
- Coote baronets of Donnybrooke (1774)

== See also ==
- Earl of Bellomont
- Baron Castle Coote
- Ballyfin Demesne
