= Robert Hitch =

English Anglican priest

Robert Hitch, was an English Anglican priest.

Hitch was educated at Trinity College, Cambridge. The Rector of Adel, he became Archdeacon of Leicester in 1661, Archdeacon of the East Riding in 1662 and Dean of York in 1665. He died on 10 February 1667.
