= Charles Coote, 1st Earl of Mountrath =

Anglo-Irish politician and soldier

Charles Coote
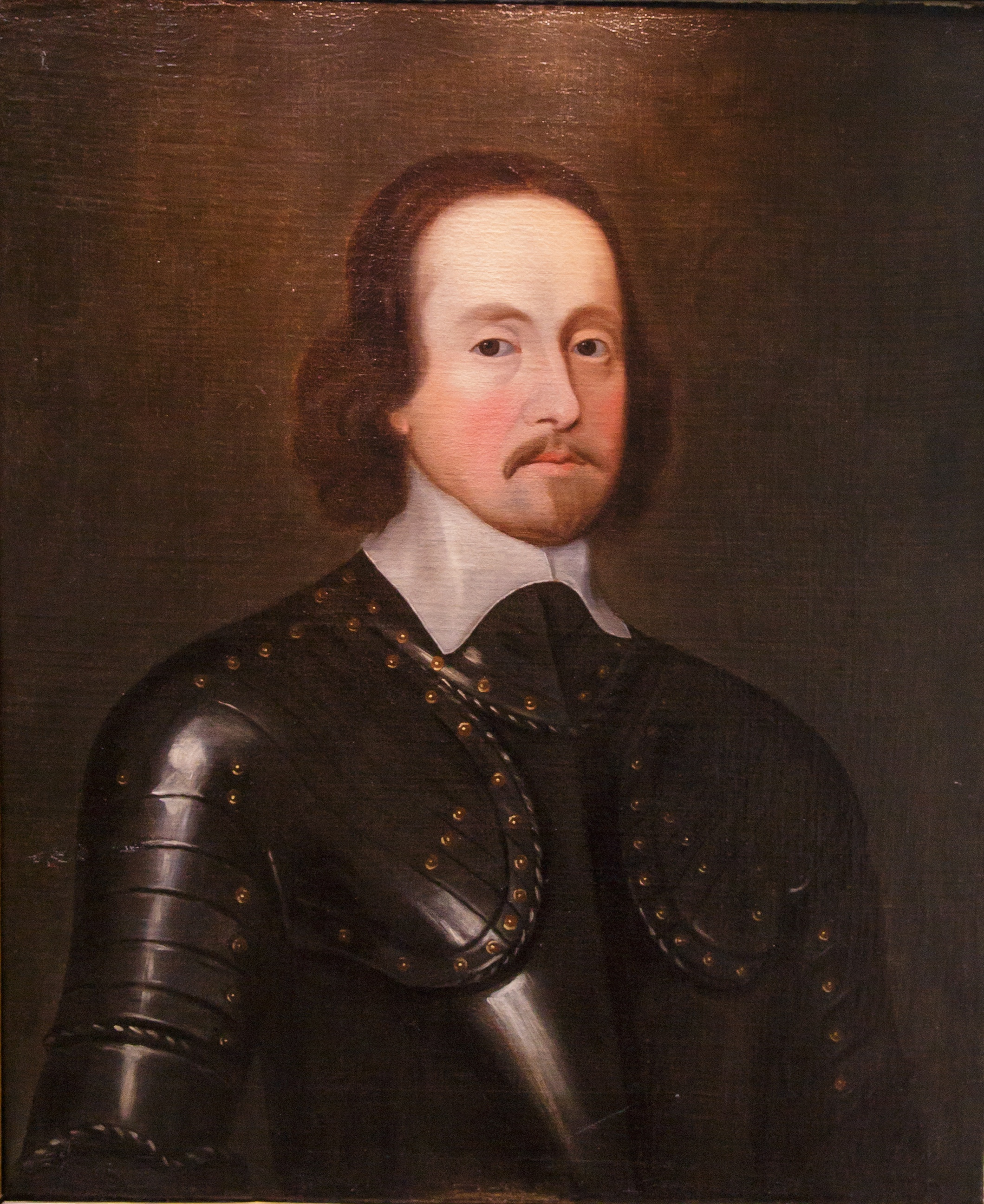
- Sir Charles Coote, c. 1642

Lords Justices of Ireland
- In office October 1660 – December 1661

Lord President of Connaught
- In office May 1645 – December 1661

Mayor of Galway
- In office 1658–1659

Member of Parliament for Galway and Mayo
- In office 1654–1660

Member of Parliament for County Leitrim
- In office 1640–Suspended

Personal details
- Born: c. 1609 Castlecoote, County Roscommon
- Died: 18 December 1661 (aged 52)
- Cause of death: Smallpox
- Resting place: Christchurch Cathedral, Dublin
- Spouse(s): (1) Mary Rushe (c. 1630–1645) (2) Jane Hannay (1645–his death)
- Children: (1) Charles (1630–1672) (2) Richard, Chidley, Dorothy (1652–1677), Hannah, and Jane
- Parent(s): Sir Charles Coote; Dorothea Cuffe
- Education: Trinity College, Dublin
- Occupation: Politician, military officer

Military service
- Battles/wars: Irish Confederate Wars; Siege of Trim 1642; Siege of Derry 1649; Battle of Lisnagarvey; Battle of Scarrifholis; Siege of Charlemont; Siege of Galway

Charles Coote, 1st Earl of Mountrath (c. 1609 – 18 December 1661) was an Anglo-Irish soldier and politician from County Roscommon. A strong advocate of the Protestant Ascendancy in Ireland, he fought for Parliament and the Commonwealth in the 1641 to 1652 Irish Confederate Wars. Coote also sat as an MP, and held various senior administrative posts, including Lord President of Connaught.

== Personal details ==
Charles Coote was born c. 1609, eldest son of Sir Charles Coote (died 1642), and his wife Dorothea. One of five surviving children, he had three brothers, Chidley (1608–1668), Richard (1620–1683), and Thomas (1621–1671), and a sister, Letitia.

Prior to 1630, Coote married Mary Rushe, with whom he had a son, another Charles (1630–1672). Mary died before 1645, when Coote married again, this time to Jane Hannay (died 1684). They had four children together, Richard, Chidley, Dorothy (1652–1677), Hannah, and Jane.

== Irish Confederate Wars ==
Relatively little is known of Coote's career prior to 1641. He entered Trinity College, Dublin in 1622, was knighted in 1626, and was elected Member of Parliament for County Leitrim in the Irish House of Commons in 1640.

After the death of his father in action defending Trim in May 1642, Charles Coote led some of the King's forces under Ormonde against the Confederate army, but was captured defending a stronghold in the Curragh of Kildare by an Irish army led by Castlehaven. He was released during the 1643 cessation of arms.

At this time Coote traveled to England with a number of Protestants to agitate for harsh anti-Catholic measures and an end to the cessation. In Dublin Archbishop Ussher condemned the extremism of Coote and his fellows, but Coote was unbending. The King, however, ignored these demands and so Coote joined the Parliamentarians. Coote was appointed commander of Connacht by the Parliamentarians in 1645. Operating from west Ulster, he temporarily overran the northwest of the province over the next two years.

== The Cromwellian Conquest ==
The execution of Charles I in 1649 led local Protestant and Scottish forces in Ulster to join the Duke of Ormond's royalist coalition, thus isolating Coote. He defended Derry against a protracted siege (March–August 1649), with the unlikely assistance of the Irish Confederate Ulster army under Owen Roe O'Neill.

After the New Model Army under Cromwell captured Drogheda, a detachment under Robert Venables headed north into Ulster, where Coote joined Venables to destroy the Scottish Ulster Royalists at the Battle of Lisnagarvey. By early 1650, however, the Irish Ulster army (now under Heber MacMahon, as O'Neill had died a few months earlier) became active once more, and Coote was again forced onto the defensive. After being reinforced, he advanced on the Irish army at Scarrifholis and routed them, killing over 2,000 soldiers and taking no prisoners. After this, Coote's army attempted to take the formidable fortress of Charlemont, which was defended by the remnants of the Ulster army, but his soldiers suffered heavy casualties before the stronghold surrendered.

With Ulster largely cleared, in June 1651, Coote advanced on Athlone from the north-west, evading a blocking force. Through this movement the town was gained; the town contained a stone bridge over the Shannon and this action thus opened up Connacht to the Parliamentarian army for the first time.

Having entered Connacht, Coote laid siege to Galey Castle, the seat of the Ó Ceallaigh clan. The Ó Ceallaighs resisted, and for their defiance, they were taken to An Creagán (a local stoney, stepped hill), and were hanged. The hill thereafter came to be known as 'Cnoc an Chrochaire', 'the Hill of the Hanging', and gave its name to the adjacent village, now Anglicised as ‘Knockcroghery’.

Coote continued westwards and besieged Galway in the winter of 1652. Galway surrendered in April 1652.

Coote inherited the substantial plantation lands of his father in the midlands of Ireland.

== Restoration ==
After Cromwell's death, Coote took part in December 1659 in a coup d'etat against The Protectorate, seizing Dublin Castle. In February 1660 he sent a representative to King Charles II, inviting him to make an attempt on Ireland. Coote was a central figure in the Convention Parliament. Following the Restoration, Charles II ennobled him Earl of Mountrath in 1660 as a reward for his support.

In the remaining months of his life, he was one of the three most powerful men in Ireland, as the King appointed him Lord Justice of Ireland, together with Roger Boyle, 1st Earl of Orrery and Sir Maurice Eustace. Pending the appointment of the Duke of Ormond as Lord Lieutenant of Ireland, the Lords Justices acted as the interim government. However, deep divisions among the three men, particularly on the question of whether dispossessed Roman Catholics should be allowed to recover their lands, seriously weakened the effectiveness of the regime.

He built Rush Hall near Mountrath, which was the family's main residence for several generations.

Coote died of smallpox in 1661 and was buried in Christchurch Cathedral, Dublin.

== Sources ==
- Cokayne, George Edward (1893). The complete peerage of England, Scotland, Ireland, Great Britain and the United Kingdom, extant, extinct, or dormant. George Bell & Sons.
- Hamilton, Lord Ernest (1920). The Irish Rebellion of 1641 with a History of the Events that led up to and succeeded it. John Murray.
- Meehan, C. P. (1882). Confederation of Kilkenny. J. Duffy.
- Scott-Wheeler, James (1999). Cromwell in Ireland. Dublin: Gill & Macmillan. ISBN 0-7171-2884-9.

Civic offices
Preceded by Gabriel King	Mayor of Galway; 1658–1659	Succeeded by John Mathews
Peerage of Ireland
New creation	Earl of Mountrath; 1660–1661	Succeeded by Charles Coote
Baronetage of Ireland
Preceded by Charles Coote	Baronet (of Castle Cuffe); 1642–1661	Succeeded by Charles Coote
