= List of French parliamentarians who died in the First World War =

The German Empire declared war on the French Republic on 3 August 1914, and France thus participated for four years in the First World War, on the Allied side and against the Central Powers. Some 1,400,000 French men, including colonial soldiers, were killed in the war during the conflict.

The political regime in France was that of the Third Republic, and Raymond Poincaré (Democratic Republican Alliance) was elected President of the Republic in 1913, indirectly by the National Assembly. Legislative elections were held in April and May 1914, producing the center-left coalition government led by Prime Minister René Viviani (Republican-Socialist Party). On 26 August, due to the war, René Viviani took over the leadership of a new government, the Sacred Union, in which all parties participated.

Enlisted in the armed forces or as civilians, sixteen members of the Chamber of Deputies and one senator were killed in the war and recognized as having died for their country. In addition, two senators died after being held hostage by German forces. The following is the list of them:

== List ==
Name	Parliamentarian (dates)	Party	Regiment	Date of birth	Death	Notes
Pierre Goujon	Deputy of Ain since April 1910.	Gauche radicale	Second lieutenant in the 229th Infantry Regiment	31 August 1875	25 August 1914, at the age of 38. Killed in combat at Méhoncourt.	
Émile Reymond	Senator of the Loire since August 1905.	Republican Federation	1st class medical officer in the health service, seconded to military aviation.	2 April 1865	22 October 1914, at the age of 49. Mortally wounded by a bullet at the controls of his aircraft during an aerial reconnaissance over the German lines. Managed to land and communicate his report before dying in hospital in Toul.	Decorated with the Knight's Cross of the Legion of Honour on his deathbed.
Paul Proust	Deputy of Savoie since May 1914.	Non-inscrit (liberal republican)	Sergeant, 97th Infantry Regiment.	10 April 1882	24 October 1914, at the age of 32. Killed in combat at Saint-Nicolas-lez-Arras.	
Édouard Nortier	Deputy for the Seine since November 1911.	Progressive Republicans	Captain in the 73rd Infantry Regiment.	4 August 1859	6 November 1914, aged 55. Died at Boezinge, Belgium, from wounds sustained in combat from a shell fragment.	
Frédéric Chevillon	Deputy for the Bouches-du-Rhône since July 1912.	Gauche radicale	Second lieutenant in the 132nd Canine Infantry Regiment	12 January 1879	21 February 1915, at the age of 36. Killed in combat at Les Éparges.	
Georges Chaigne	Deputy of Gironde since April 1914.	Republican Federation	Lieutenant in the infantry, commanding a machine gun section.	9 October 1887	5 April 1915, at the age of 27. Killed in combat at Mortmare Wood, in the Forest of Argonne.	
Alfred Mézières	Deputy of Meurthe-et-Moselle from 1881 to 1898, then Senator of Meurthe-et-Moselle since 1900.	Democratic Republican Alliance	-	19 November 1826	10 October 1915, at the age of 88. Held hostage in his house by the German occupiers, he later died in his hometown of Réhon, a week after being released.	
Émile Driant	Member of Parliament for Meurthe-et-Moselle since April 1910.	Action libérale	Lieutenant-colonel, commanding the 56th and 59th battalion of Chasseur à pied.	11 September 1855	22 February 1916, at the age of 60. Killed in combat at Bois des Caures on the second day of the Battle of Verdun .	Promoted to officer of the Legion of Honour in 1914. Rapporteur of the bill creating the Croix de guerre, with which he was decorated.
André Thome	Member of Parliament for Seine-et-Oise since April 1914.	Gauche démocratique	Second lieutenant in the 147th Infantry Brigade.	24 October 1879	10 March 1916, at the age of 36. Wounded in combat, he died in Marre a few hours later.	Decorated with the Knight's Cross of the Legion of Honour on his deathbed.
Josselin de Rohan-Chabot	Member of Parliament for Morbihan since April 1914.	Groupe des droites	Captain in the infantry.	4 April 1879	13 July 1916, aged 37. Died at Bray-sur-Somme from wounds received in combat during the Battle of the Somme.	Decorated with the Croix de Guerre for his conduct at Fort Douaumont where he was wounded in February 1916.
Maurice Bernard	Deputy of Doubs since May 1914.	Gauche radicale	Captain in the Chasseur à pied	5 May 1877	10 October 1916, at the age of 39. Detached to military aviation, he died in a flight accident during his training at the aviation school at Pau.	Decorated with the Croix de guerre.
Charles Sébline	Senator of Aisne since August 1905.	Gauche radicale	-	8 June 1846	10 February 1917, at the age of 70. He lived during the war in Montescourt-Lizerolles, where he was mayor. The German occupier held him hostage, then destroyed his house and took him to Aulnoye-Aymeries station to be deported to Germany. He died "of fatigue and cold" in this war as the train arrived.	Suffering from a painful physical disability, he could only speak in the Senate while seated.
Raoul Briquet	Member of Parliament for Pas-de-Calais since May 1910.	SFIO	-	4 November 1875	25 March 1917, at the age of 41. Killed by a German bomb in Bapaume, where he was distributing aid to the newly liberated population with the deputy Albert Tailliandier(below) .	
Albert Tailliandier	Member of Parliament for Pas-de-Calais since May 1914.	Republican Federation	Second lieutenant in the 8th Régiment d'infanterie territoriale	28 April 1875	25 mars 1917, at the age of 42. Killed by a German bomb in Bapaume, where he was distributing aid to the newly liberated population with the deputy Raoul Briquet (below) .	
René Reille-Soult de Dalmatie	Member of Parliament for Tarn since April 1914.	Non-inscrit (libéral progressiste)	Lieutenant, 62nd Artillery Regiment.	10 February 1888	20 June 1917, at the age of 29. Killed in action at Essigny-le-Grand.	
Uriane Sorriaux	Member of Parliament for Pas-de-Calais since May 1914.	SFIO	-	12 July 1859	26 July 1918, at the age of 59. In the occupied zone, he was arrested by the Germans and deported to Belgium. Having helped an escaped English prisoner, he was imprisoned and died in prison in Vilvorde.	Worked in coal mines from the age of 10.
Gaston Dumesnil	Member of Parliament for Maine-et-Loire since April 1914.	Republican Federation	Captain in the 106th Infantry Regiment.	24 January 1879	8 September 1918, at the age of 39. Died in Mont-de-Leuilly from wounds caused by shell fragments. His comrade, MP Abel Ferry (below), fatally hit by the same shell, died a week later.	Wounded in combat in September 1915 and decorated with the Croix de guerre.
Abel Ferry	Member of Parliament for Vosges since April 1909.	Gauche radicale	Second Lieutenant, 166th Infantry Regiment.	26 May 1881	15 September 1918, at the age of 37. Mortally wounded by a shell which killed Gaston Dumesnil (above), he lay dying for a week before dying at Vauxaillon.	Nephew of Jules Ferry.
Henri Durre	Member of Parliament for Nord from May 1906 to May 1910 and since then May 1914.	SFIO	-	15 September 1867	28 October 1918, at the age of 51. A civilian, he was killed by a German soldier in Anzin while returning to the North to be there at the time of the liberation.	

== See also ==
- List of British parliamentarians who died in the First World War
