= Henry Parnell, 5th Baron Congleton =

Anglo-Irish peer and soldier (1890–1914)

Lieutenant The Right Honourable The Lord Congleton
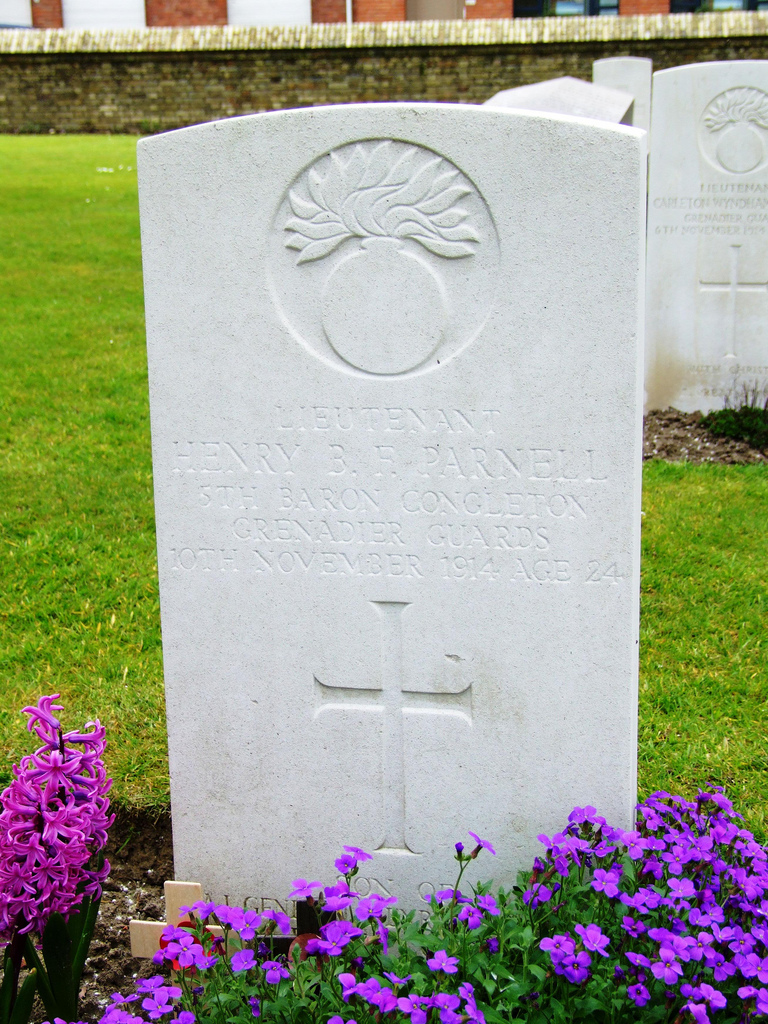
- Parnell's grave in Zillebeke

Member of the House of Lords Lord Temporal
- In office 6 September 1911 – 10 November 1914; Hereditary peerage
- Preceded by: The 4th Baron Congleton
- Succeeded by: The 6th Baron Congleton

Personal details
- Born: Henry Bligh Fortescue Parnell; 6 September 1890 Clonmel, County Tipperary, Ireland
- Died: 10 November 1914 (aged 24) Zillebeke, West Flanders, Belgium
- Resting place: Zillebeke Churchyard Commonwealth War Graves Commission Cemetery
- Education: Eton College
- Alma mater: New College, Oxford

Lieutenant Henry Bligh Fortescue Parnell, 5th Baron Congleton (6 September 1890 – 10 November 1914) was an Anglo-Irish soldier and aristocrat of the British peerage. At the age of 24, he was killed in action in the Ypres Salient, becoming the second British parliamentarian to die on the front line during the First World War.

== Biography ==
Parnell was born in Clonmel, County Tipperary, into a family of Anglo-Irish Protestant landowners. He was the second-born child to Henry Parnell, 4th Baron Congleton (1839–1906) and his wife Elizabeth Peter Dove (1853–1931). His father was a veteran of the 1879 Anglo-Zulu War. Parnell was the great-grandson of the Irish Whig politician Henry Parnell, who was a government minister in the Whig administrations led by Lord Grey and Lord Melbourne in the 1830s. He was knighted and made 1st Baron Congleton in 1841. Harry Parnell was thus also related to the Irish nationalist leader Charles Stewart Parnell, of whom the 1st Baron Congleton was a great-uncle. Sir John Parnell, 2nd Baronet (1744–1801) was the Chancellor of the Exchequer of Ireland.

Parnell also came from a family with a military tradition. His grandfather Henry William Parnell, 3rd Baron Congleton, was an officer in the Royal Navy who took part in the Battle of Navarino against the Ottomans in 1827. Parnell's father, also named Henry, the 4th Baron, was a major general in the British Army and took part in the Crimean War and the Battle of Inyezane during the Anglo-Zulu War. Parnell was educated at Eton College, and was still a pupil there when his father died on 12 November 1906. The 16-year-old Henry thus became the 5th Baron Congleton, although he was not able to sit in the House of Lords until he came of age in 1911. There are no records of him ever speaking in the chamber.

He studied Modern History at New College, Oxford. In his first year at the university, he was reprimanded for starting a bonfire in the college quadrangle; some of his fellow students were even expelled from New College for setting fire to a teacher's furniture. He later settled down and successfully completed his Bachelor of Arts in 1912. Parnell attended Oxford while his brother John attended the University of Cambridge. During these same three years he trained at the Officers' Training Corps at Oxford, and was commissioned into the Grenadier Guards in 1912. In 1913 he met the explorer Joseph Foster Stackhouse, and planned to accompany him on a mission to explore King Edward VII Land in the Antarctic. The project struggled to find funding, and as Stackhouse left for the South Seas in August 1914, the First World War broke out and Parnell was mobilised. A lieutenant in the 2nd Battalion Grenadier Guards, he fought in the First Battle of Ypres. He was killed in action at Zillebeke on 10 November 1914.

With Arthur O'Neill MP having been killed at Zillebeke four days earlier, Harry Parnell was the second of forty-three British parliamentarians to die in the war and who are commemorated by a memorial in Westminster Hall, within the grounds of the Palace of Westminster where Parliament sat. Also, dying at the age of 24 years and two months, he was the youngest of them. He was succeeded as Baron Congleton by his brother John. His youngest brother William Alastair Damer Parnell was also killed in the war, dying at Lesboeufs in the Battle of the Somme in France on 25 September 1916.

== See also ==
- List of British parliamentarians who died in the First World War
