= Thomas Trollope, 3rd Baron Kesteven =

May 1, 1891 - November 5, 1915 (Mr)

Thomas Trollope

Member of the House of Lords
- Hereditary peer
- In office 26 July 1915 – 5 November 1915

Personal details
- Born: 1 May 1891
- Died: 5 November 1915 (aged 24) Oran, French Algeria
- Education: Eton College

Thomas Carew Trollope, 3rd Baron Kesteven (1 May 1891 – 5 November 1915) was a British aristocrat and member of the House of Lords who was killed in action during the First World War.

== Biography ==
The only son of Major Robert Trollope, he grew up in Taunton in Somerset, and was educated at Eton College. He then pursued a military career, joining the Lincolnshire Yeomanry cavalry regiment in 1908, where his uncle, John Trollope, 2nd Baron Kesteven, was a lieutenant colonel. He was promoted to captain at the start of the First World War, he was sent to France and assigned to the Indian Cavalry Corps. Upon the death of his uncle John, 26 July 1915, he inherited the title of Baron Kesteven, and a seat in the House of Lords of the Parliament of the United Kingdom.

He returned briefly to the United Kingdom, then joined the Lincolnshire Yeomanry regiment, which was sent to the Balkans. It was while the regiment was being transported from Gibraltar to Alexandria by the naval vessel SS Mercian that the latter was attacked by the German submarine U-38. On 3 November, he was injured on board, and was hospitalized in Oran in French Algeria, where he died two days later at the age of 24. His body was repatriated and buried alongside those of his ancestors in Crowcombe Church near Taunton.

He is one of the forty-three British parliamentarians who died during the war and are commemorated by a memorial in Westminster Hall, within the grounds of the Palace of Westminster in London where Parliament sits. As he died without children, his title of baron became extinct with him.

== See also ==
- List of British parliamentarians who died in the First World War
