= Victor Conyngham, 5th Marquess Conyngham =

Peer

Victor Conyngham
- Lord Conyngham

Member of the House of Lords
- Hereditary peer
- In office 30 January 1904 – 9 November 1918
- Preceded by: Henry Conyngham, 4th Baron Minster
- Succeeded by: Frederick Conyngham, 6th Baron Minster

Personal details
- Born: Victor George Henry Francis Conyngham; 30 January 1883 London, England
- Died: 9 November 1918 (aged 35) York, England

Victor George Henry Francis Conyngham, 5th Marquess Conyngham (30 January 1883 – 9 November 1918) was a British military officer and nobleman. He was the last British parliamentarian to be killed in World War I.

== Biography ==
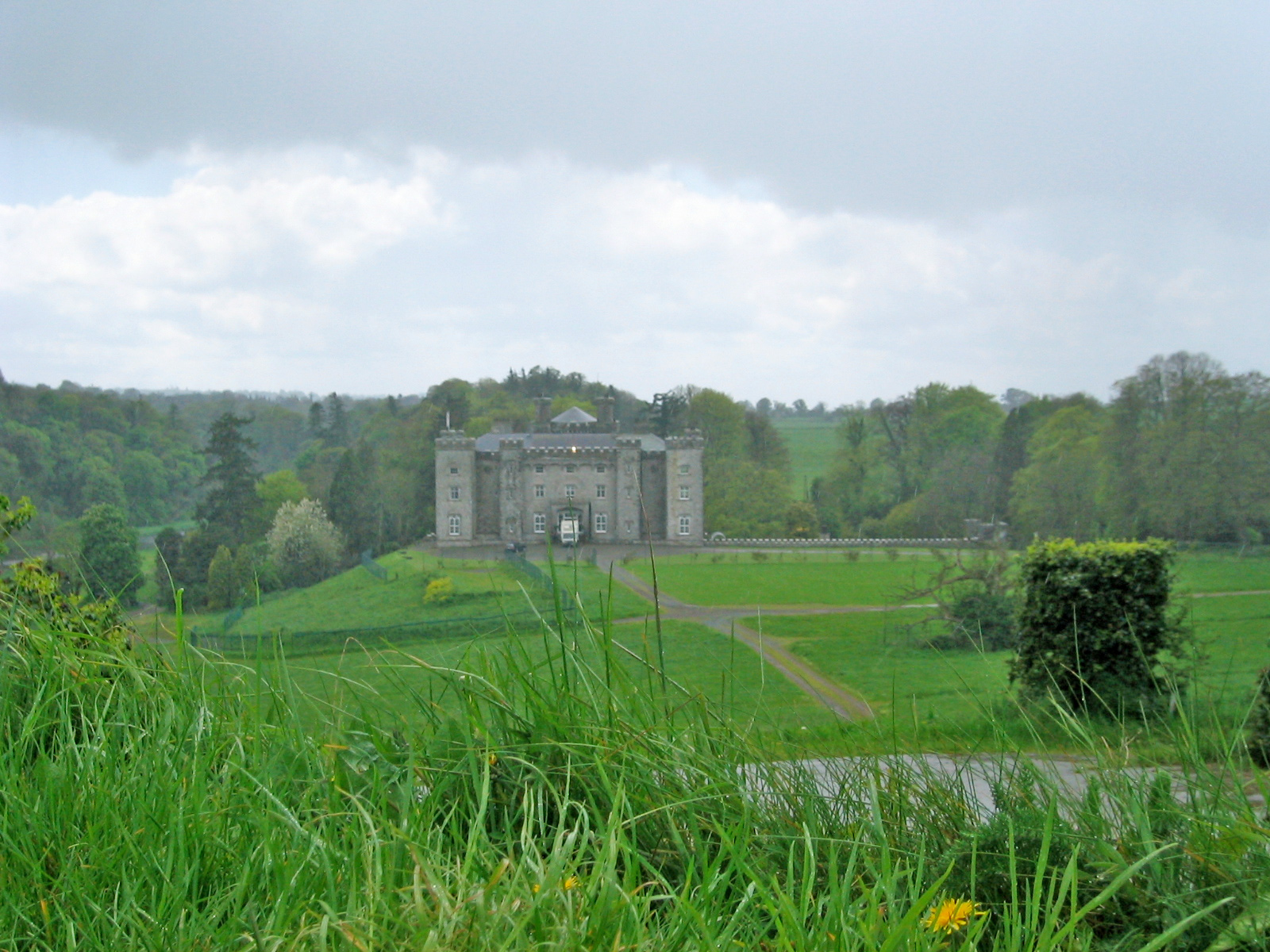
Slane Castle, the family manor of the Marquesses of Conyngham in Ireland.

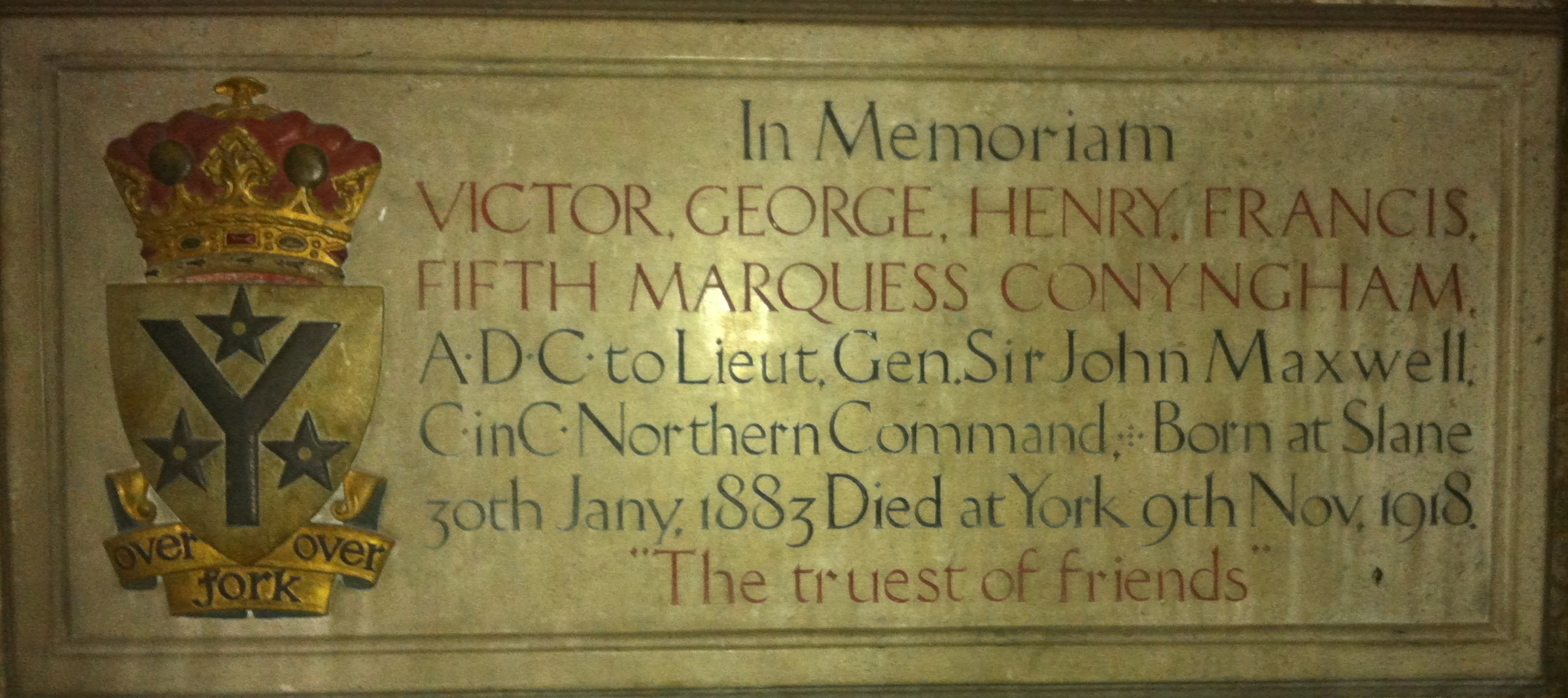
Plaque in memory of Victor Conyngham at York Minster

He is the eldest of the seven children of Henry Conyngham, 4th Marquess Conyngham. The title of Baron Conyngham was created in 1781 by George III, King of Ireland, for another Henry Conyngham, a descendant of Scottish settlers established in Ireland, and a member of the Privy Council of Ireland. The Scottish Baron, also named Henry, was created Marquess of the Peerage of Ireland in 1816, and then jointly Baron Minster of the Peerage of the United Kingdom in 1821, which entitled him to a seat in the House of Lords of the Parliament of the United Kingdom. Victor Conyngham is the great-great-grandson of the latter.

Educated at Eton College, the young man then joined the British Army and participated in the end of the Second Boer War in 1902. He inherited the titles of Marquess Conyngham and Baron Minster upon his father's death on 28 August 1897, and thus obtained the right to sit in the House of Lords from the date he came of age in January 1904. During the First World War, he was a lieutenant in the South Irish Horse cavalry in the 7th battalion of the Royal Irish Regiment, deployed on the Western Front with the British Expeditionary Force. He served for a timeas aide-de-campto Sir John Maxwell, and later participated in the Battle of Passchendaele. He survived the fighting but contracted pneumonia in the trenches amid the Spanish flu pandemic and died on 9 November 1918. He died at the age of 35, two days before the Armistice. He is buried in the churchyard of the Anglican church in Slane, where Slane Castle, the family manor house, is located, in the province of Leinster in eastern Ireland. He is chronologically the last of the forty-three British parliamentarians who died during the War and are commemorated by a memorial in Westminster Hall within the grounds of the Palace of Westminster where Parliament sits. Never married, he had no children, and his brother Frederick inherited his titles.

== See also ==
- List of British parliamentarians who died in the First World War
