= List of British parliamentarians who died in the First World War =

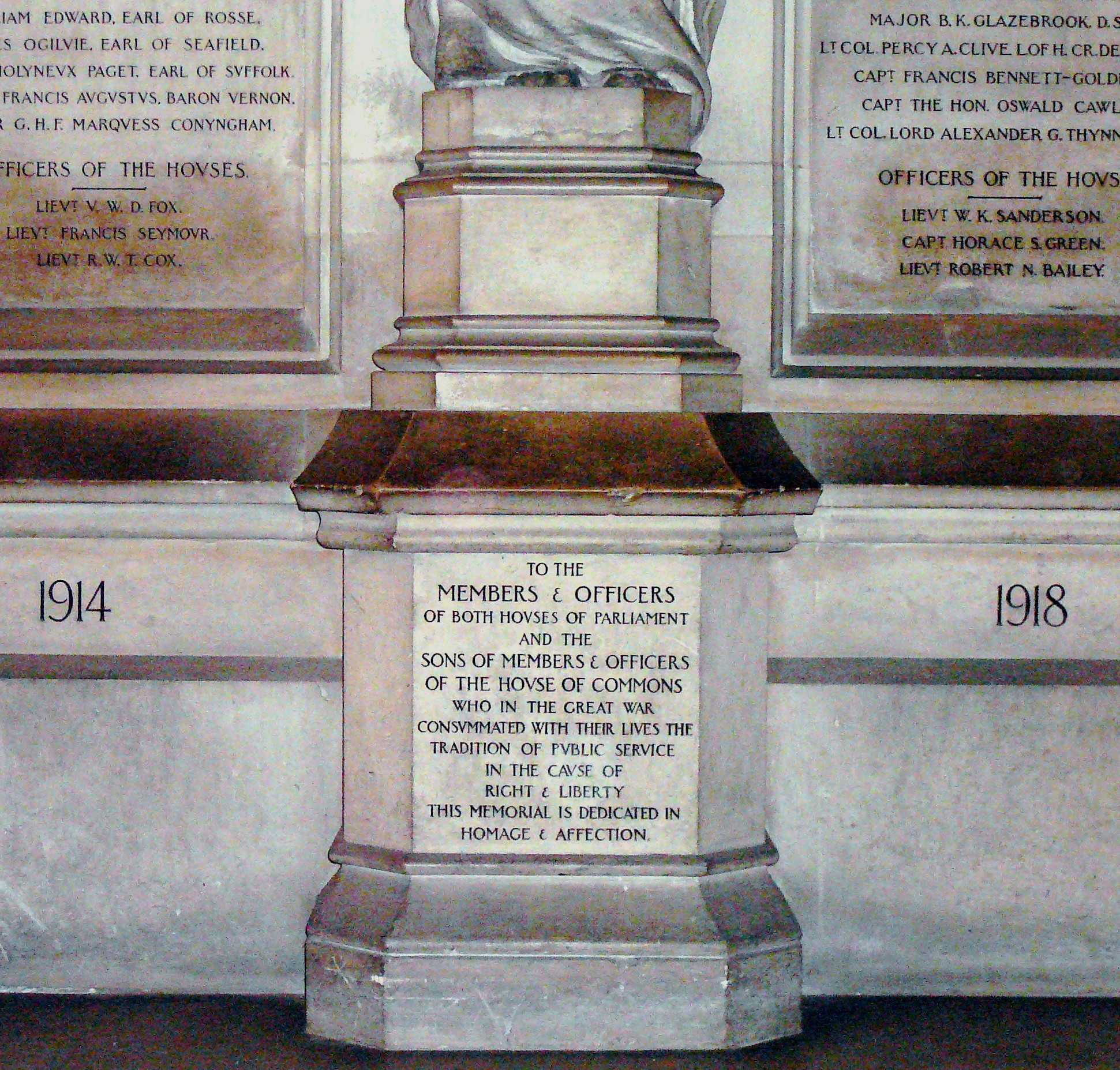
Parliamentary War Memorial, Westminster Hall

The United Kingdom of Great Britain and Ireland declared war on the German Empire on 4 August 1914 following the invasion of Belgium by Germany, and thus participated for four years in the First World War, on the side of the Allies and against the Central Powers. Some 750,000 British men were killed in war during this conflict.

At the start of the war, the prime minister of the United Kingdom was the Liberal H. H. Asquith, who was reappointed following the December 1910 general election. He led a Liberal minority government, with the support without participation of Irish nationalist MPs from the Irish Parliamentary Party. Challenged for his management of the war, Asquith was forced into May 1915 to form a government of national unity including the Conservative Party and the Labour Party. The prime minister was forced by the Conservatives to resign in December 1916, and David Lloyd George succeeded him at the head of the coalition.

A total of 264 members of the House of Commons enlisted in the armed forces during the First World War. 23 members of the House of Commons were killed in the war (or died as a result of their participation), as were twenty members of the House of Lords and three former members of the Commons. A memorial commemorates these forty-three men, as well as the staff of the two Chambers and the soldiers who died at the front who are sons of parliamentarians, in Westminster Hall, within the grounds of the Palace of Westminster where Parliament sits.

== List ==
These forty-three parliamentarians or former parliamentarians who died at the front or as a result of the war are, in chronological order.

#	Name	Parliament	Party	Regiment	Birth	Death	Notes
1	Arthur O'Neill	MP for Mid Antrim since January 1910	Irish Unionist Alliance	Captain, 2d Life Guards Regiment (Cavalry)	19 September 1876	6 November 1914, at the age of 38. Killed in action at Klein Zillebeke, Belgium.	
2	Henry Parnell, 5th Baron Congleton	Hereditary peer in the House of Lords since 1911	Uncertain	Lieutenant, 2nd Battalion, Grenadier Guards	6 September 1890	10 November 1914, at the age of 24. Killed in action at Klein Zillebeke, Belgium.	
3	Frederick Roberts, 1st Earl Roberts	Hereditary peer in the House of Lords since 1892 (knighted)	Uncertain	British Army field marshal	30 September 1832	14 November 1914, at the age of 82. Died of pneumonia while visiting Indian troops on the front at Saint-Omer, France.	Commander-in-Chief of the Forces from 1901 to 1904. Recipient of the Victoria Cross for his actions during the Indian Rebellion of 1857 in 1857.
4	Wyndham Knatchbull-Hugessen, 3rd Baron Brabourne	Hereditary peer in the House of Lords since 1909	Liberal	2nd Lieutenant, 1st Battalion Grenadier Guards	21 September 1885	11 March 1915, at the age of 29. Killed in action at the Battle of Neuve-Chapelle.	
5	Will Gladstone	MP for Kilmarnock Burghs since September 1911	Liberal	Lieutenant, Royal Welch Fusiliers	14 July 1885	13 April 1915, at the age of 29. Killed in action near Laventie, France.	Grandson of former prime minister William Ewart Gladstone.
6	John Esmonde	MP for North Tipperary since December 1910	Irish Parliamentary Party	Captain, Royal Army Medical Corps	21 January 1862	17 April 1915, at the age of 53. Died of pneumonia and exhaustion.	
7	Arthur French, 5th Baron de Freyne	Hereditary peer in the House of Lords since September 1913	Uncertain	Captain, 3rd Battalion, South Wales Borderers	3 July 1879	9 May 1915, at the age of 35. Killed at the Battle of Aubers.	
8	Harold Cawley	MP for Heywood since January 1910	Liberal	Captain, 6th Battalion, Manchester Regiment	12 June 1878	23 September 1915, at the age of 37. Killed in action at the Battle of the Dardanelles.	
9	Thomas Agar-Robartes	MP for St Austell since February 1908	Liberal	Captain, 1st Battalion, Coldstream Guards	22 May 1880	30 September 1915, at the age of 35. Killed by a sniper at the Battle of Loos while assisting a wounded comrade.	
10	Lord Ninian Crichton-Stuart	MP for Cardiff since December 1910	Conservative	Lieutenant-Colonel, 6th Battalion, Welch Regiment	15 May 1883	2 October 1915, at the age of 32. Killed in action at the Battle of Loos.	
11	Charles Mills	MP for Uxbridge since January 1910	Conservative	2nd Lieutenant, 2nd Battalion, Scots Guards	13 March 1887	6 October 1915, at the age of 28. Killed in action at Hulluch, France.	Baby of the House from January to December 1910.
12	William Walrond	MP for Tiverton since February 1906	Conservative	Lieutenant, Railway Supply Detachment, Royal Army Service Corps	22 May 1876	2 November 1915, at the age of 39. Repatriated after being wounded in action in France, and dying of his wounds.	
13	Thomas Pakenham, 5th Earl of Longford	Hereditary peer in the House of Lords since 1887	Conservative	Brigadier General, 2nd 2nd South Midland Mounted Brigade	19 October 1864	21 August 1915, at the age of 50. Killed in action at the Battle of Sari Bair during the Gallipoli campaign.	
14	Lionel Petre, 16th Baron Petre	Hereditary peer in the House of Lords since December 1908	Uncertain	Captain, 4th Pioneer Battalion, Coldstream Guards	November 3, 1890	30 September 1915, at the age of 24. Died of his wounds at the Battle of Loos.	
15	Thomas Trollope, 3rd Baron Kesteven	Hereditary peer in the House of Lords since July 1915	Uncertain	Captain, Lincolnshire Yeomanry (Cavalry)	1 May 1891	5 November 1915, at the age of 24. Wounded aboard the freighter SS Mercian torpedoed by a German submarine, and died at Oran in Algeria two days later.	
16	George Venables-Vernon, 8th Baron Vernon	Hereditary peer in the House of Lords since September 1909	Liberal	Captain, Derbyshire Yeomanry	28 September 1888	10 November 1915, at the age of 27. Died of dysentery, contracted while participating in the Gallipoli campaign.	
17	James Ogilvie-Grant, 11th Earl of Seafield	Hereditary peer in the House of Lords since 1897	Uncertain	Captain, 3rd Battalion, Cameron Highlanders	18 April 1876	12 November 1915, at the age of 39. Died of wounds received in Flanders.	Scottish nobleman, 30th Chief of Clan Grant.
18	Gilbert Sackville, 8th Earl De La Warr	Hereditary peer in the House of Lords since 1896	Uncertain	Lieutenant, Royal Naval Volunteer Service	22 March 1869	16 December 1915, at the age of 46. Died in Messina, Italy, of rheumatic fever and dysentery contracted while serving in the Navy.	
19	Michael Hicks Beach, Viscount Quenington	MP for Tewkesbury since February 1906	Conservative	Captain, Royal Gloucestershire Hussars Yeomanry	19 January 1877	23 April 1916, at the age of 39. Died of wounds received at Qatia in the Egyptian Sinai.	
20	Herbert Kitchener, 1st Earl Kitchener	Hereditary Peer in the House of Lords since 1898 (knighted)	Unaffiliated	British Army field marshal	24 June 1850	5 June 1916, at the age of 65. Died on board HMS Hampshire, sunk by a German mine.	Secretary of State for War since 1914
21	Duncan Campbell	MP for North Ayrshire since December 1911	Unionist	Lieutenant-Colonel, Duke of Wellington's Regiment	28 April 1876	4 September 1916, at the age of 40. Seriously wounded in the left arm at the First Battle of Ypres in November 1914, he returned to the front a year later. Wounded by a mine on the western front, he was repatriated once again and died of his injuries.	Born in Ontario, Canada; decorated with the Distinguished Service Order
22	Tom Kettle	MP for East Tyrone from July 1906 to December 1910	Irish Parliamentary Party	Lieutenant, Royal Dublin Fusiliers	9 February 1880	9 September 1916, at the age of 36. Killed in action at the Battle of the Somme.	Also economist, lawyer, journalist and poet
23	Guy Baring	MP for Winchester since February 1906	Conservative	Lieutenant Colonel, 1st Battalion, Coldstream Guards	26 February 1873	15 September 1916, at the age of 43. Killed in action at the Battle of the Somme.	
24	Charles Duncombe, 2nd Earl of Feversham	MP for Thirsk and Malton from February 1906 to February 1915, then hereditary peer in the House of Lords	Conservative	Lieutenant-Colonel, 21st Battalion of the Royal Corps of the King's Rifles	8 May 1879	15 September 1916, at the age of 37. Killed in action at the Battle of Flers-Courcelette.	
25	Gerald Arbuthnot	MP for Burnley from January to December 1910	Conservative	2nd Lieutenant, Grenadier Guards	19 December 1872	25 September 1916, at the age of 43. Killed in action at the Battle of the Somme.	
26	John Rolls, 2nd Baron Llangattock	Hereditary peer in the House of Lords since 1912	Uncertain	Major, 1st Monmouthshire Battery, Royal Field Artillery	25 April 1870	31 October 1916, at the age of 46. Died of his wounds at the Battle of the Somme.	Older brother of Charles Rolls, the co-founder of Rolls-Royce.
27	Auberon Herbert, 9th Baron Lucas	Hereditary peer in the House of Lords since 1905	Liberal	Captain, Royal Flying Corps	25 May 1876	3 November 1916, at the age of 40. Wounded by a German fighter plane over German lines, aboard his plane, and died of his wounds.	Parliamentary Under-Secretary of State for War from 1908 to 1911, and for the Colonies in 1911.
28	Henry Barnes, 2nd Baron Gorell	Hereditary peer in the House of Lords since 1913	Uncertain	Major, 19th London Battery, Royal Field Artillery	21 January 1882	16 January 1917, at the age of 34. Killed in action at Ypres, Belgium.	
29	Henry Howard, 19th Earl of Suffolk	Hereditary peer in the House of Lords since 1898	Liberal	Major, Wiltshire Battery, 3rd Wessex Brigade, Royal Field Artillery	13 September 1877	21 April 1917, at the age of 39. Killed in action at the Battle of Istabulat during the Mesopotamia campaign.	
30	Valentine Fleming	MP for Henley since January 1910	Conservative	Major, C Squadron, Oxfordshire Hussars	17 February 1882	20 May 1917, at the age of 35. Killed by German bombardment near Épehy, France.	Posthumously awarded the Distinguished Service Order. Father of writers Peter and Ian Fleming.
31	Shelley Scarlett, 5th Baron Abinger	Hereditary peer in the House of Lords since 1903	Uncertain	Commander, Royal Naval Volunteer Reserve	1 April 1872	23 May 1917, at the age of 45. Died in London in unspecified circumstances, but listed by Parliament as a casualty of war.	Adoptive grandson of Mary and Percy Bysshe Shelley.
32	Willie Redmond	MP for Wexford from 1883 to 1885, for Fermanagh North from 1885 to 1892 and for Clare East from 1892	Irish Parliamentary Party	Major, 6th Battalion, Royal Irish Regiment	13 April 1861	7 June 1917, at the age of 56. Died of a wound sustained during the Battle of Messines.	Prominent personality of the Irish nationalist movement.
33	Francis McLaren	MP for Spalding since January 1910	Liberal	2nd Lieutenant, Royal Flying Corps	16 June 1886	30 August 1917, at the age of 31. Died in a flight accident during training.	
34	Neil Primrose	MP for Wisbech since January 1910	Liberal	Captain, Royal Buckinghamshire Yeomanry	14 December 1882	18 November 1917, at the age of 34. Died of wounds sustained in the Third Battle of Gaza.	Deputy Minister for Foreign Affairs (February to May 1915). Parliamentary Secretary to the Treasury (December 1916 to March 1917). Son of former prime minister Archibald Primrose, 5th Earl of Rosebery.
35	Philip Glazebrook	MP for Manchester South since March 1912	Conservative	Major, King's Shropshire Light Infantry	24 December 1880	7 March 1918, at the age of 37. Killed in action at Al-Bireh in Palestine.	Decorated with the Distinguished Service Order two months before his death.
36	Percy Clive	Member of Parliament for Ross from 1900 to 1906, and again from January 1908	Conservative Party(Liberal Unionist Party until 1912.)	Lieutenant Colonel, Lancashire Fusiliers	13 March 1873	5 April 1918, at the age of 35. Wounded twice. Killed in action at Bucquoy in France.	Decorated with the National Order of the Legion of Honour and the Croix de Guerre
37	William Parsons, 5th Earl of Rosse	Hereditary peer elected to the House of Lords as a representative peer by his Irish peers in 1911.	Uncertain	Major, 1st Battalion, Irish Guards	14 June 1873	10 June 1918, at the age of 44. Died from war wounds.	
38	William Poulett, 7th Earl Poulett	Hereditary peer in the House of Lords since 1899	Uncertain	Captain, Warwickshire Royal Horse Artillery	11 September 1883	11 July 1918, at the age of 34. Died in service, of the Spanish flu.	
39	Francis Bennett-Goldney	MP for Canterbury since December 1910.	Independent Unionist	Major, Royal Army Service Corps	1865	27 July 1918, at the age of 51. Military Attaché at the British Embassy in Paris; died in a car accident in Brest.	
40	Oswald Cawley	MP for Prestwich since January 1918	Liberal	Captain, Shropshire Yeomanry	7 October 1882	22 August 1918, at the age of 35. Killed in action near Merville, France.	Third of four siblings to die in the war, after John in 1914 and Harold, also a Liberal MP, in 1915.
41	Lord Alexander Thynne	MP for Bath since January 1910	Conservative	Lieutenant Colonel, Royal Wiltshire Yeomanry	17 February 1873	16 September 1918, at the age of 45. Killed in action at Béthune, France.	Decorated with the Distinguished Service Order and the Croix de Guerre
42	Charles Lyell	MP for East Dorset (1904–1910), then Edinburgh South (1910–1917)	Liberal	Major, Fife Royal Garrison Artillery	18 May 1875	18 October 1918, at the age of 43. Died of pneumonia in Washington, D.C. while on duty.	
43	Victor Conyngham, 5th Marquess Conyngham	Hereditary peer in the House of Lords since 1904	Uncertain	Lieutenant, South Irish Horse	30 January 1883	9 November 1918, at the age of 35. Aide-de-camp to Lt. Gen. John Maxwell; died on duty, of pneumonia resulting from the 1918 flu.	

== See also ==
- List of French parliamentarians who died in the First World War
