= Montescourt station =

Railway station in Montescourt-Lizerolles, France

Montescourt
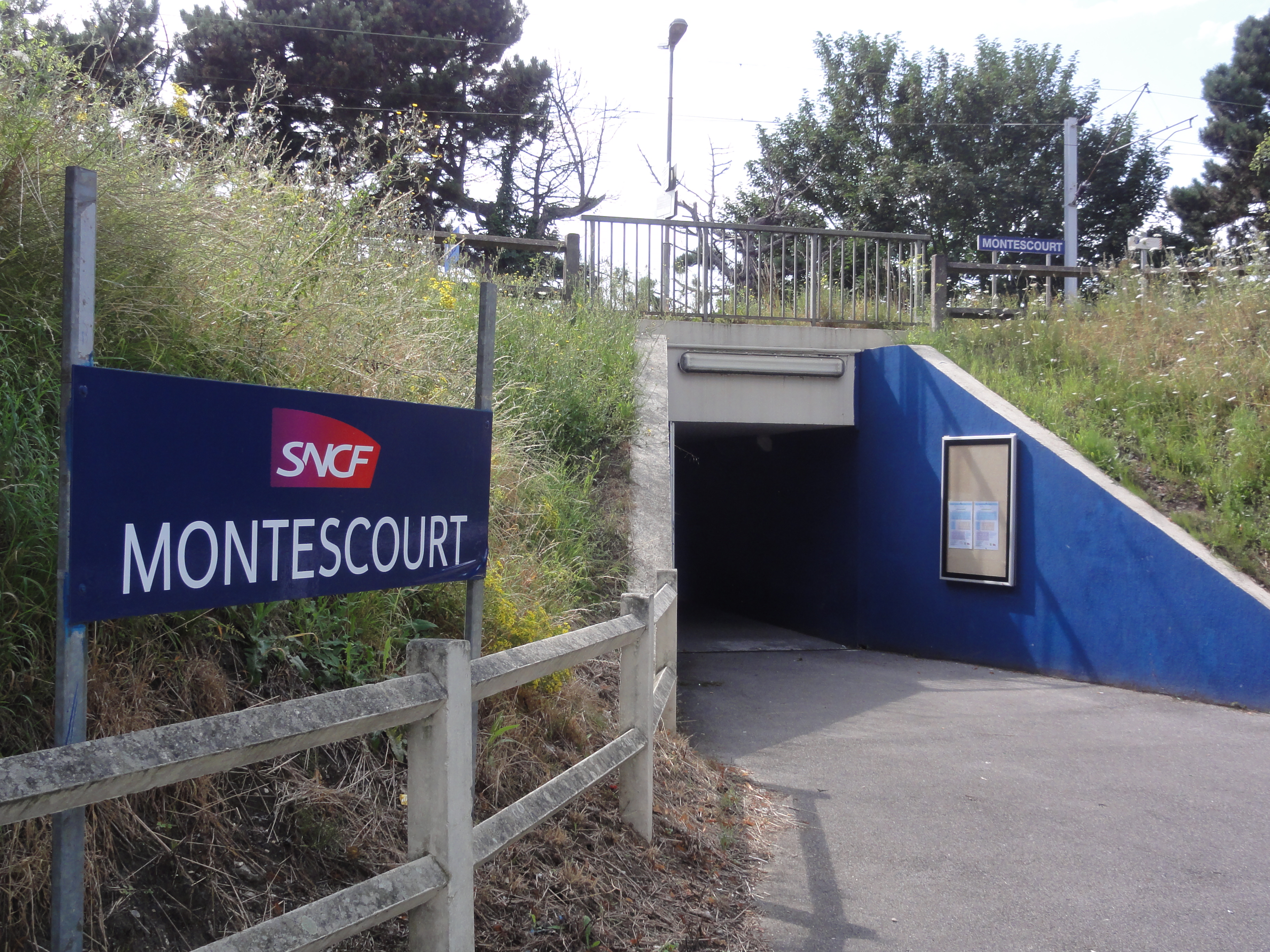
- New access to station platforms

General information
- Location: Rue Paul Demoulin; 02440 Montescourt-Lizerolles; Aisne, France
- Coordinates: 49°44′18″N 3°15′7″E
- Elevation: 81 m (266 ft)
- Owner: SNCF
- Operator: SNCF TER Hauts-de-France
- Line: Creil–Jeumont railway
- Distance: 140.856 km
- Platforms: 1
- Tracks: 2

Other information
- Station code: 87296418

Passengers
- 2018: 13 215

Services
Preceding station	TER Hauts-de-France	Following station
Saint-Quentin Terminus	Proxi P14	Mennessis towards Compiègne
Location

Montescourt (French: Gare de Montescourt) is a railway station located in the commune of Montescourt-Lizerolles in the Aisne department, France. It is situated at kilometric point (KP) 140.856 on the Creil–Jeumont railway. The station is served by TER Hauts-de-France trains between Compiègne and Saint-Quentin.

== History ==
In 2018, according to the SNCF 13 215 passengers passed through Montescourt station.

=== Image gallery ===
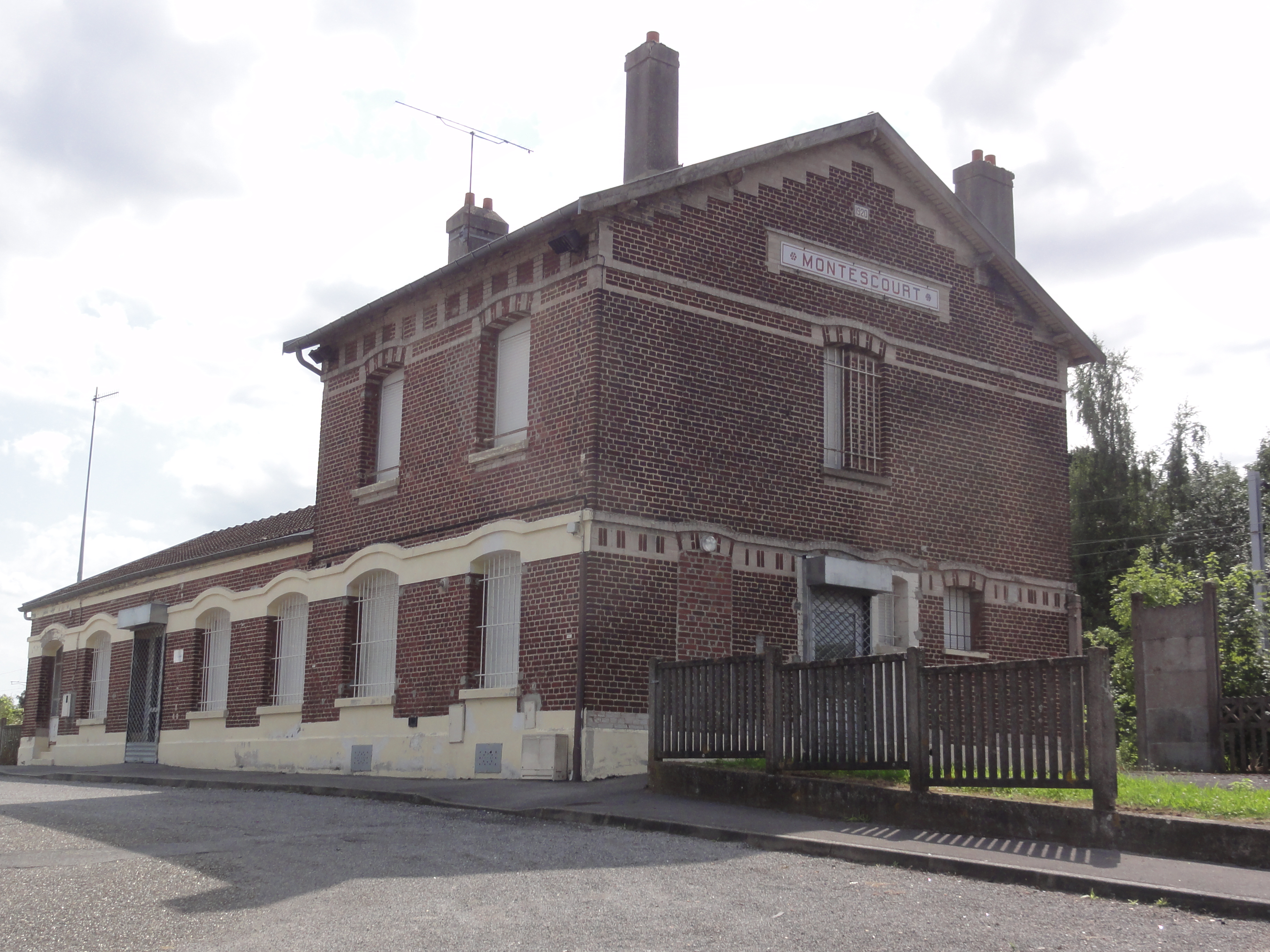
Old passenger building which is no longer used by SNCF.

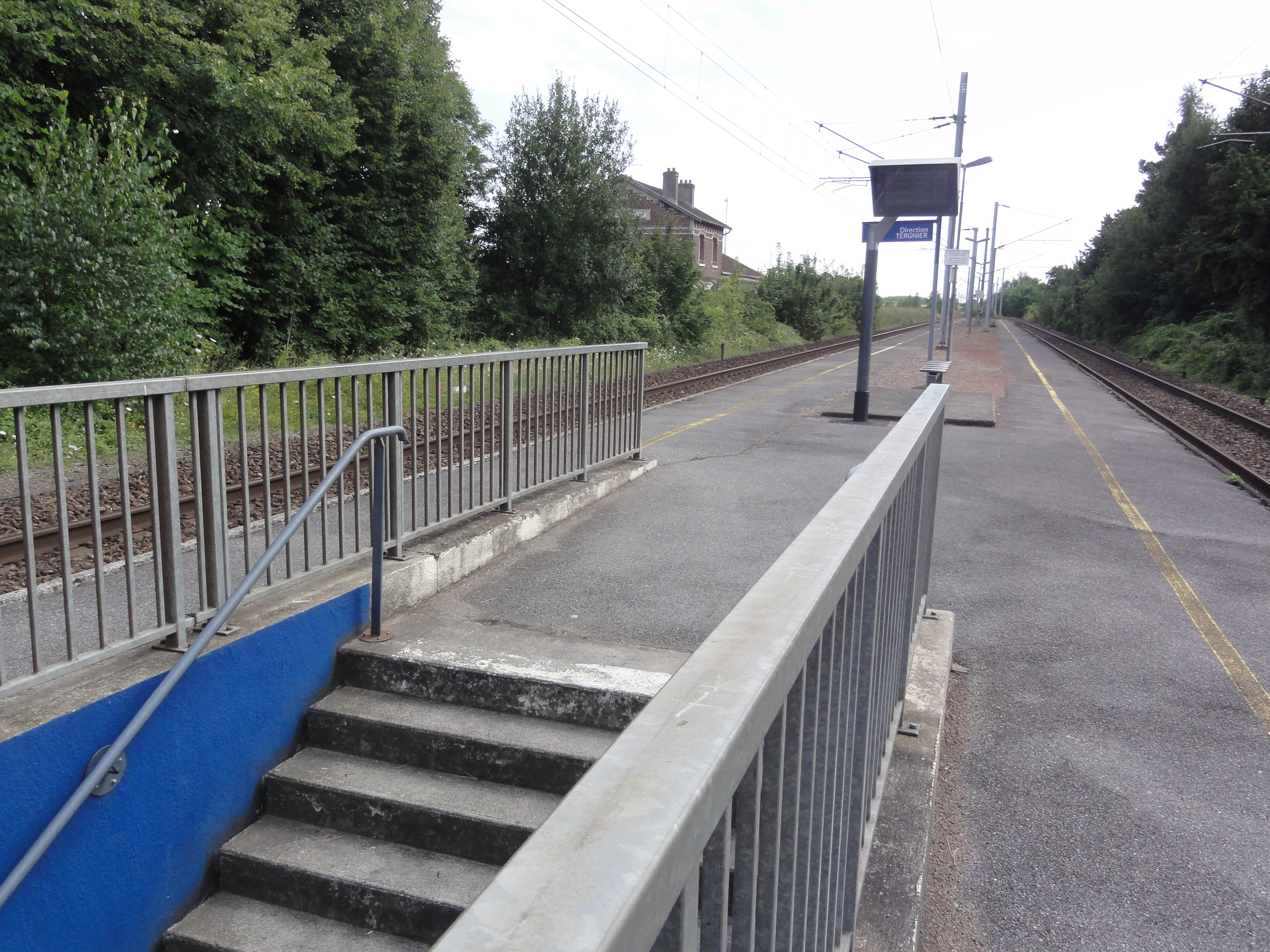
Station platform.
