= Zillebeke Churchyard Commonwealth War Graves Commission Cemetery =

WWI CWGC cemetery in Ypres, Belgium

Zillebeke Churchyard
- Commonwealth War Graves Commission
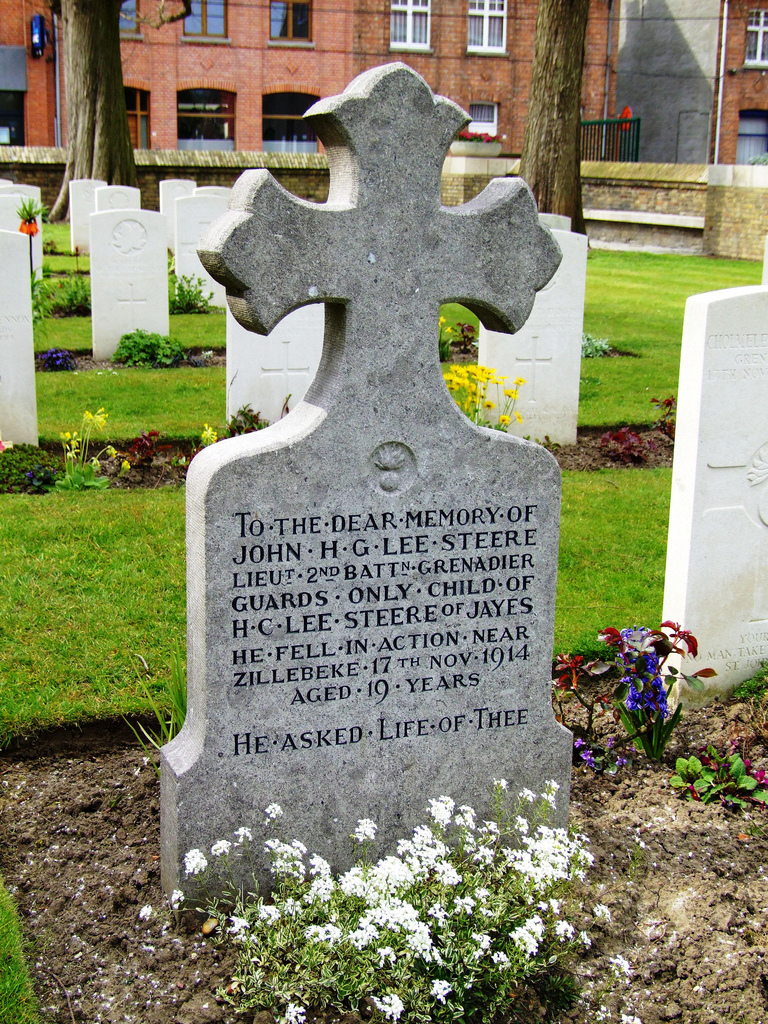
- Used for those deceased 1914
- Established: 1914
- Location: 50°50′09″N 02°55′21″E near Ypres, West Flanders, Belgium
- Designed by: W H Cowlishaw
- Total burials: 32

Burials by nation
- Allies of World War I: United Kingdom: 22; Canada: 10

Burials by war
- World War I: 32

Zillebeke Churchyard Commonwealth War Graves Commission Cemetery forms part of the village churchyard located around the Catholic parish church of Zillebeke in Belgium. A section of the parish churchyard used by the inhabitants of Zillebeke is maintained as a war cemetery by the Commonwealth War Graves Commission as a burial ground for the dead of the First World War near Ypres (Ieper) on the Western Front.

== Foundation ==
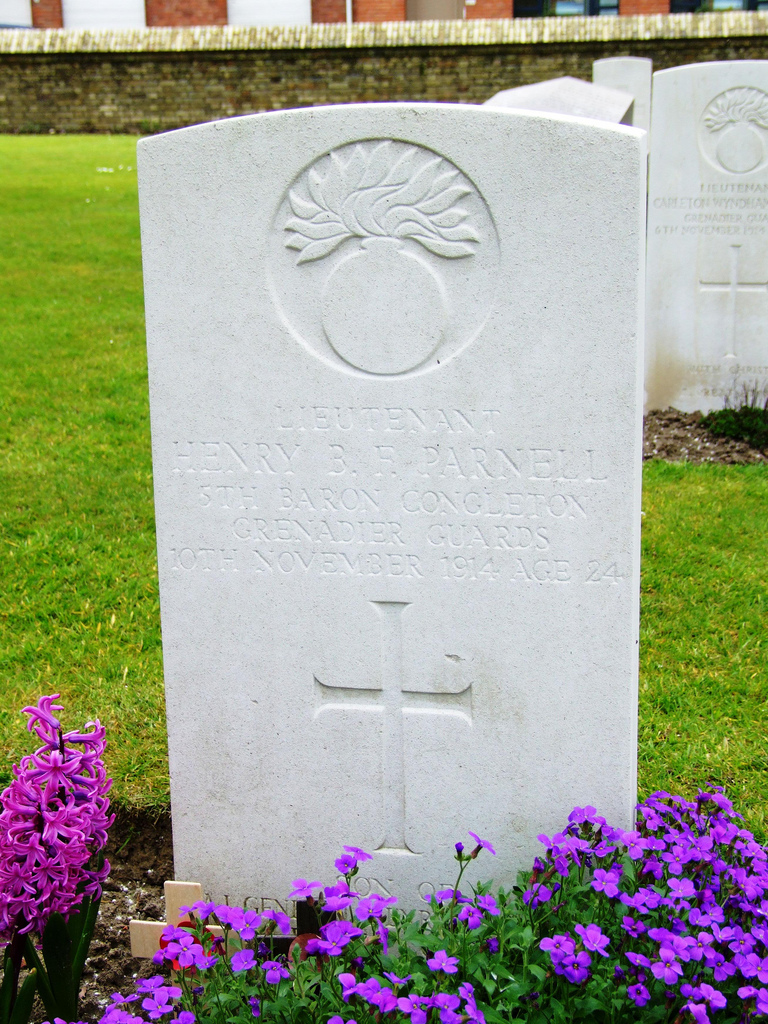
Grave of Lieutenant The 5th Baron Congleton

In the early days of the war, whilst the front line was still mobile, specific cemeteries for soldiers were comparatively rare and the dead were often buried in local churchyards or municipal burial grounds near where they were killed. Zillebeke was on the front line for much of the war and its churchyard was used for the war dead. These 1914 burials of British and Canadian soldiers reflect the mobility of the front line as they are largely of officers, and reflect the officer class of that point in the war as they were nobility or the sons of the wealthy and the well-connected.

== Development ==
The grounds of the war cemetery were assigned to the United Kingdom in perpetuity by King Albert I of Belgium in recognition of the sacrifices made by the British Empire in the defence and liberation of Belgium during the war. The Commonwealth War Graves Commission part of the cemetery was designed by W H Cowlishaw. Within Zillebeke Churchyard CWGC Cemetery there is a section with war graves of soldiers from aristocratic backgrounds; this plot is called The Aristocrat's Cemetery.

The cemetery deviates from almost every other Commission burial ground by having two private memorials, breaking the "equality in death" principle the commission was founded under and not complying with Sir Frederic Kenyon's report, still otherwise followed to this day, that Commission cemeteries "were designed to avoid class distinctions that would conflict with the feeling of 'brotherhood' which had developed between all ranks serving at the Front". The private memorials are a headstone dedicated to Lieutenant John Henry Gordon Lee-Steere and the tomb of Second Lieutenant Baron Alexis George de Gunzburg.

The private memorials in the cemetery are a headstone dedicated to Lieutenant John Henry Gordon Lee-Steere and the tomb of Second Lieutenant Baron Alexis George de Gunzburg.

== Notable burials ==
Among those buried in the cemetery are:

- Major Lord Bernard Gordon-Lennox (10 November 1914)
- Lieutenant-Colonel Gordon Chesney Wilson (6 November 1914)
- Lieutenant Henry Parnell, 5th Baron Congleton (10 November 1914)
