= Second Viviani government =

- Government of French Third Republic

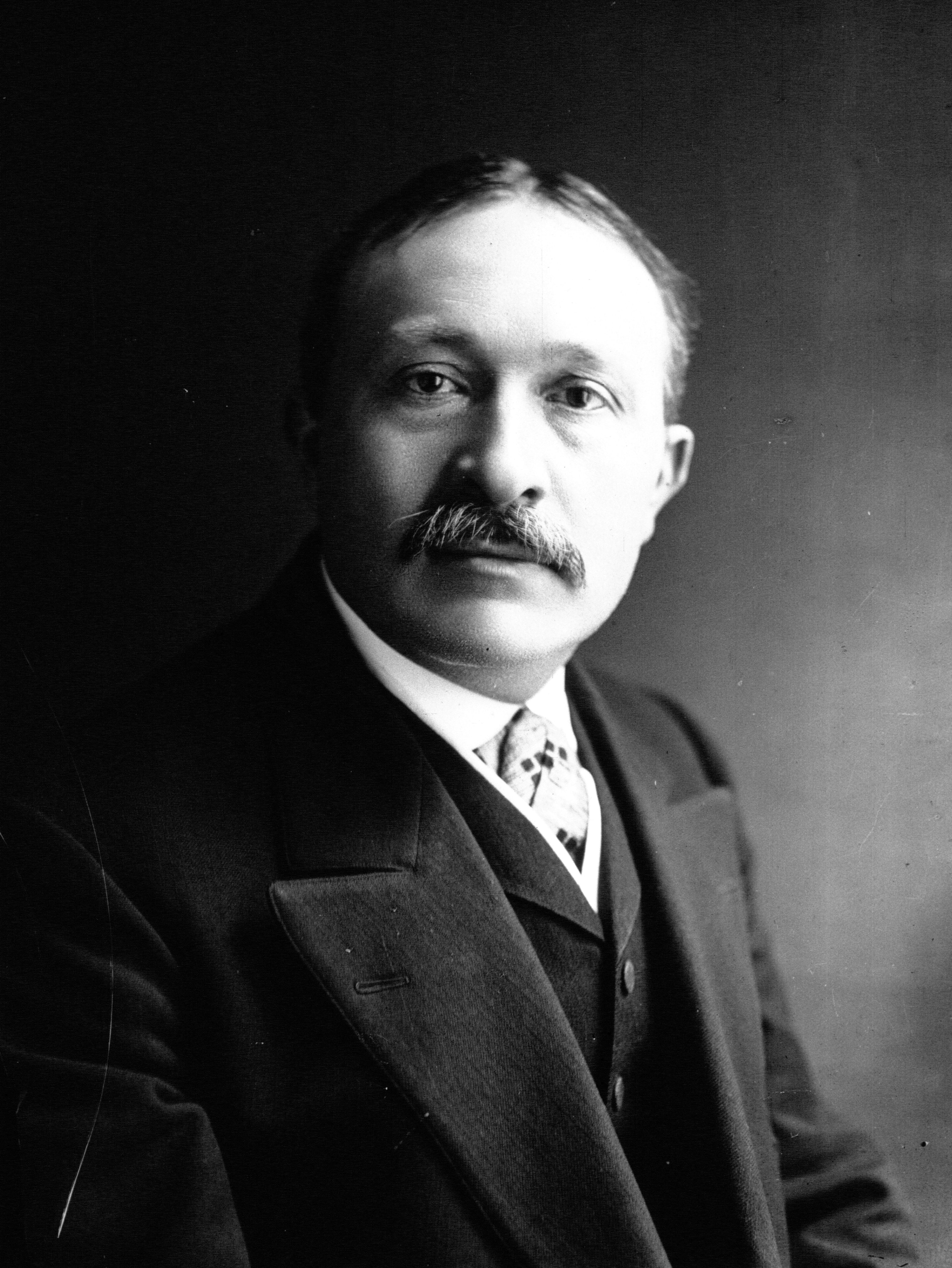
- Viviani in 1912
- Date formed: 26 August 1914
- Date dissolved: 29 October 1915

People and organisations
- President of the Republic: Raymond Poincaré
- Prime Minister: René Viviani
- Deputy Prime Minister: Aristide Briand
- Total no. of members: Ministers: 14; Undersecretaries of State: 8
- Member parties: PRS-PRRRS–AD–SFIO–RI-FR-ALP
- Status in legislature: Majority 601 / 601 (100%)

History
- Election: 1914
- Predecessor: Viviani I
- Successor: Briand V

The Second Viviani Government was a government of the French Third Republic, formed on the 26th of August 1914 as a result of the formation of the new Sacred Union coalition due to the breakout of the First World War.

== Composition ==
Post	Name	Party
Prime Minister	René Viviani	PRS
Deputy Prime Minister	Aristide Briand	PRS
Ministers
Minister of Foreign Affairs	Théophile Delcassé (until October 15, 1915)	RI
Minister of Foreign Affairs	René Viviani	PRS
Minister of War	Alexandre Millerand	SE
Minister of Public Education	Albert Sarraut	PRRRS
Minister of the Interior	Louis Malvy	PRRRS
Minister of Justice	Aristide Briand	PRS
Minister of the Navy	Jean-Victor Augagneur	PRS
Minister of Agriculture	Fernand David	RI
Minister of Finance	Alexandre Ribot	FR
Minister of Public Works	Marcel Sembat	SFIO
Minister of Commerce, Industry, Posts and Telegraphs	Gaston Thomson	AD
Minister of Colonies	Gaston Doumergue	PRRRS
Minister of Labor and Social Welfare	Jean Bienvenu-Martin	PRRRS
Minister Without Portfolio	Jules Guesde	SFIO
Undersecretaries of States
Undersecretary for Foreign Affairs	Abel Ferry	RI
Undersecretary of the Interior	Paul Jacquier	PRRRS
Undersecretary for Public Education	Albert Dalimier	PRRRS
Sous-secrétaire d'État à la Marine, chargé de la Marine marchande (à partir du 13 mars 1915)	Georges Bureau	AD
Undersecretary of State for the Navy (à partir du 18 mai 1915)	Albert Thomas	SFIO
Undersecretary of State for War (from July 1, 1915)	Joseph Thierry	FR
Undersecretary of State for War (from July 1, 1915)	Justin Godart	PRRRS
Undersecretary for the airforce (from September 14, 1915)	René Besnard	PRRRS
