= Montescourt-Lizerolles =

- Commune
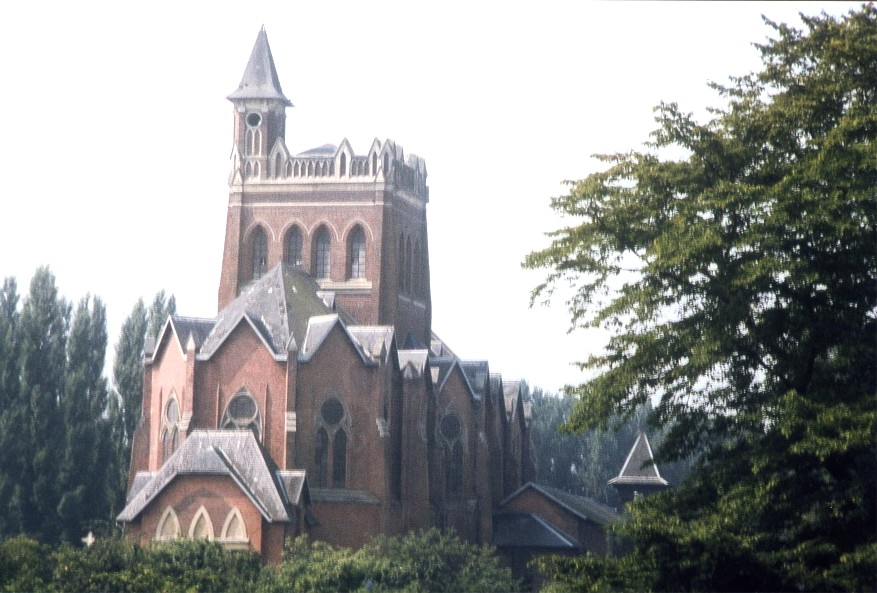
- The church of Montescourt

- Coat of arms
- Location of Montescourt-Lizerolles
- Location within France Location within Hauts-de-France
- Coordinates: 49°44′21″N 3°15′30″E
- Country: France
- Region: Hauts-de-France
- Department: Aisne
- Arrondissement: Saint-Quentin
- Canton: Ribemont
- Intercommunality: CA Saint-Quentinois

Government
  - Mayor (2026–32): Stéphane Linier
- Area^{1}: 6.29 km^{2} (2.43 sq mi)
- Elevation: 70 m (230 ft)
- Highest elevation: 102 m (335 ft)
- Lowest elevation: 68 m (223 ft)
- Population (2023): 1,606
  - Density: 255/km^{2} (661/sq mi)
- Time zone: UTC+01:00 (CET)
  - Summer (DST): UTC+02:00 (CEST)
- INSEE/Postal code: 02504 /02440
- ^{1} French Land Register data, which excludes lakes, ponds, glaciers > 1 km^{2} (0.386 sq mi or 247 acres) and river estuaries.

Montescourt-Lizerolles is a commune in the Aisne department in Hauts-de-France in northern France. Montescourt station has rail connections to Saint-Quentin and Compiègne.

== Population ==
Historical population
Year	Pop.	±% p.a.
1968	1,814	—
1975	1,668	−1.19%
1982	1,485	−1.65%
1990	1,460	−0.21%
1999	1,476	+0.12%
2007	1,654	+1.43%
2012	1,684	+0.36%
2017	1,648	−0.43%
2023	1,606	−0.43%
Source: INSEE

== See also ==
- Communes of the Aisne department
