= Bapaume town hall explosion =

1917 bombing during World War I

Coordinates: 50°06′14.1″N 2°50′58.7″E

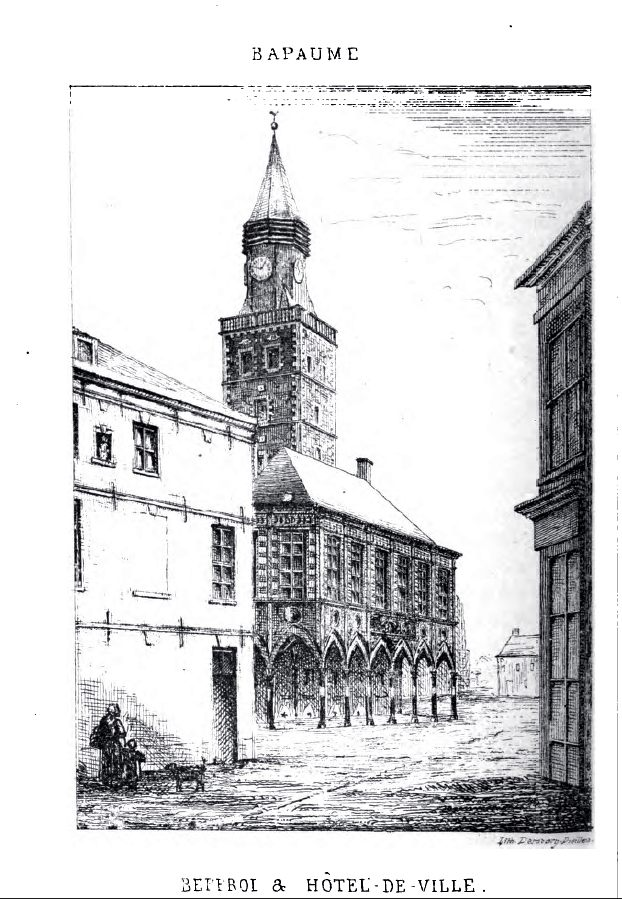
The town hall depicted pre-war

On 25 March 1917 an explosion at the town hall in Bapaume, Pas-de-Calais, France, killed 24 people including Australian soldiers, civilians of the Australian Comforts Fund and two members of the French parliament. An explosive device had been left behind on a time-delayed fuse by German troops, hoping to kill members of an Allied headquarters unit. After the war the town hall was rebuilt and includes memorials to those that died.

== Background ==
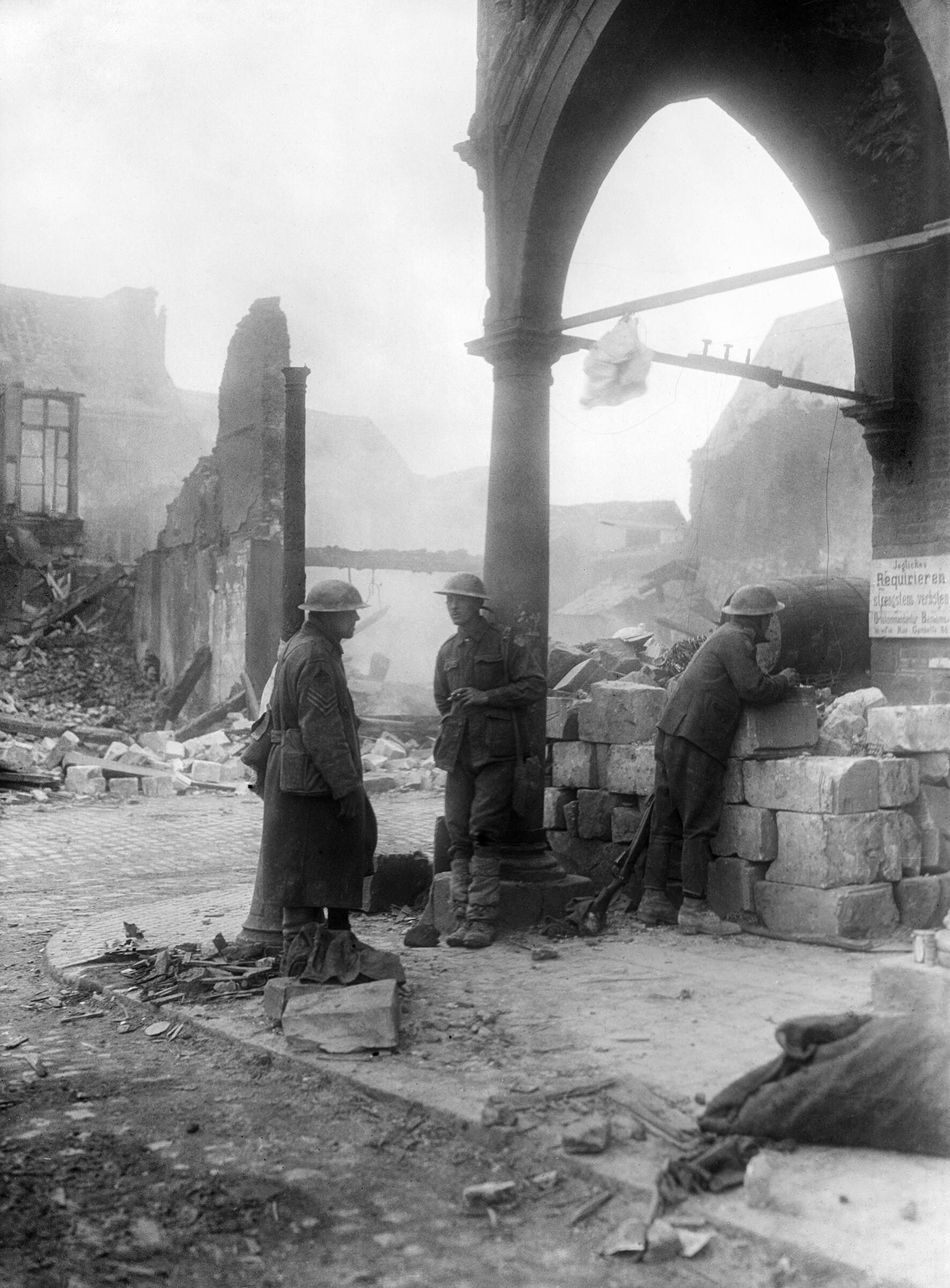
Australian troops outside the town hall 19 March 1917

In early spring 1917 the German forces on the Western Front of the First World War withdrew to prepared defensive positions on the Hindenburg Line as part of Operation Alberich. The Hindenburg Line was a series of fortifications intended to be held with fewer troops than the previous forward positions, releasing troops for offensives elsewhere. During their retreat the Germans adopted a scorched earth policy, destroying things that might be of value to the Allied forces. They also left behind land mines and booby traps intended to kill or injure Allied troops. During their withdrawal the Germans abandoned the town of Bapaume, which they had held since the first months of the war in 1914.

== Explosion ==
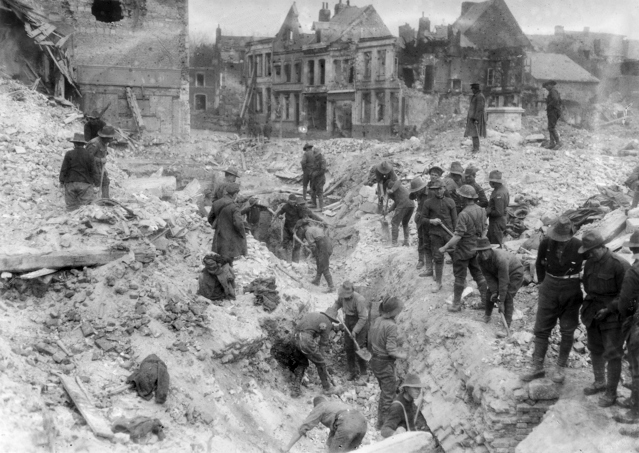
Remains of Bapaume Town Hall after mine explosion

Australian troops liberated Bapaume on 17 March 1917. The Germans had destroyed many of the buildings but the town hall remained standing. Knowing that the building might have been booby trapped it was Allied policy to search buildings and transport junctions for devices before they were used. An explosive device was found in the town hall cellar and removed. It is thought the Germans knew the building had a high likelihood of being used for a unit headquarters.

The town hall had been considered for the site of the headquarters of the British Fifth Army but this was decided against. The town hall was instead used to host a coffee stall staffed by the civilian Australian Comforts Fund and as a base for visitors to view the devastation in the town.

On the night of 25 March the building was occupied by around 30 Australian troops, civilians of the comfort fund and two deputies of the French parliament. The latter were Albert Tailliandier and Raoul Briquet. Tailliandier was the local member of parliament for the town and was visiting for the first time since its liberation.

At 11:30 pm a charge of around 100 pounds (45 kg) of explosive detonated in the town hall's tower. The charge had been missed during the earlier searches and was detonated by means of an acid delayed action fuse.

The explosion killed 24 men, including all those sleeping on the ground floor. Six men sleeping in the cellar survived and were dug out by Australian soldiers the following day. Tailliandier and Briquet were among those killed.

== Aftermath and legacy ==
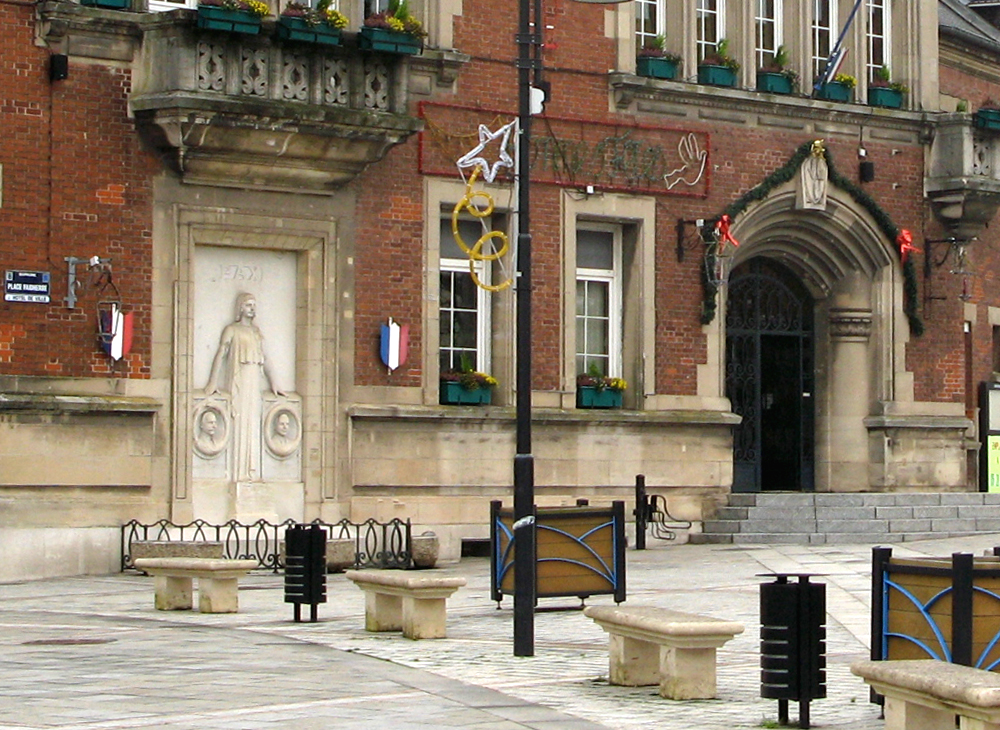
The modern façade with memorial to the two deputies

Around the time of the explosion a German radio operator was captured. He asked his captors if they had spotted an explosion from the direction of Bapaume and indicated it was one of several delayed action bombs left in the area. On 26 March another explosion occurred at a dugout on the outskirts of the town, killing two signallers from the Australian 7th Brigade.

The town hall was rebuilt after the war and an art deco-style memorial installed on the façade, to the memory of Tailliandier and Briquet. On 26 March 2011 two plaques next to the memorial were inaugurated, listing the Australian dead from the explosion and noting where they are buried or commemorated.
