= Abel Ferry =

French politician (1881–1918)

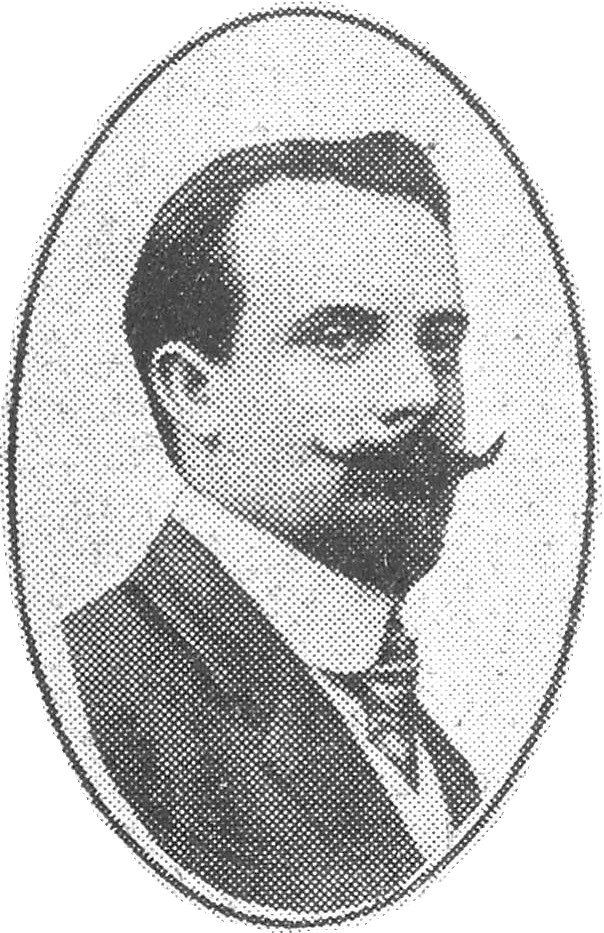
Abel Ferry in 1911

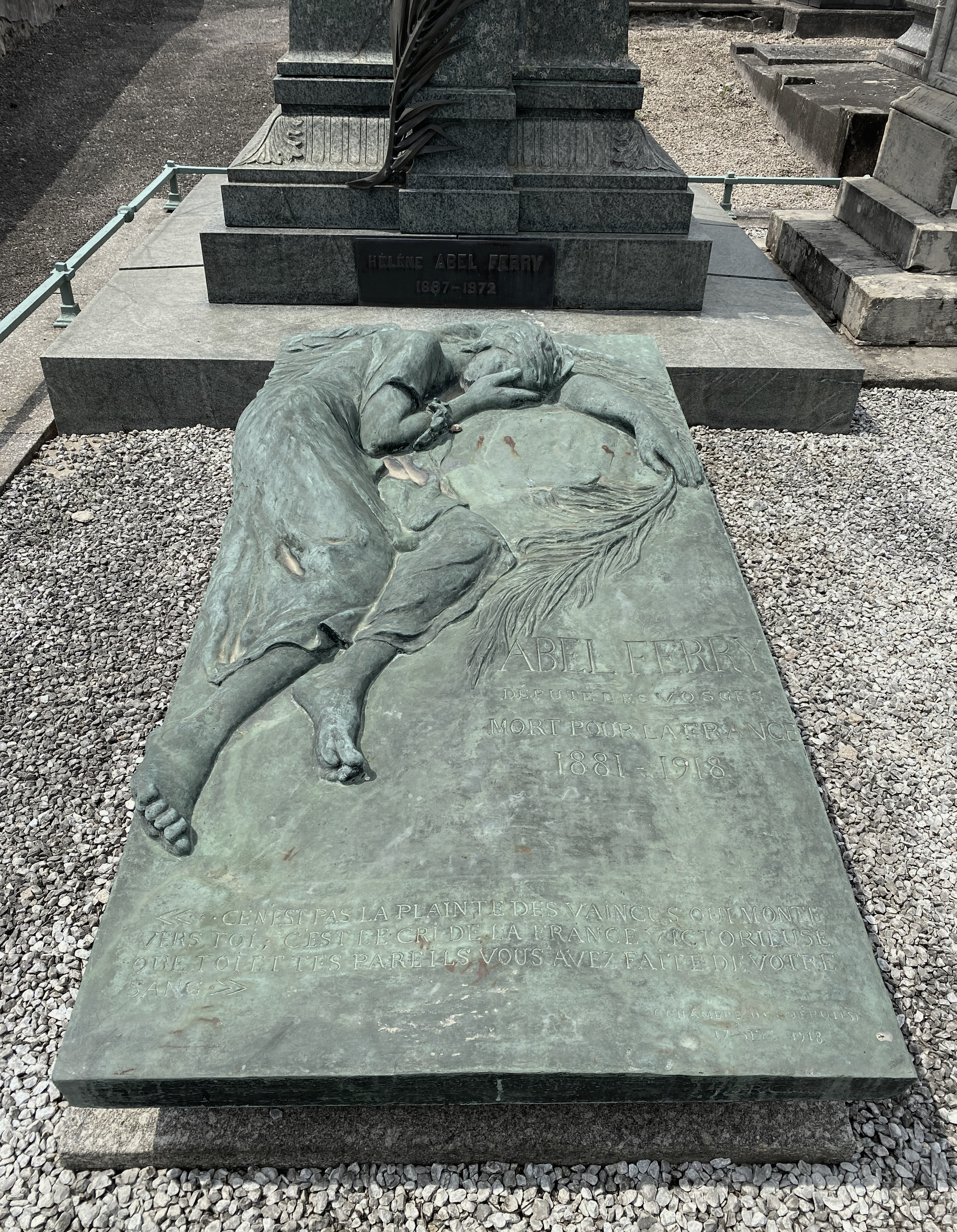
Abel Ferry's grave in Saint-Dié-des-Vosges, in front of the burial monument of his uncle Jules Ferry

Abel Jules Édouard Ferry (26 May 1881 – 15 September 1918) was a French politician and soldier.

== Life ==
Ferry was born in Paris, the son of Senator Charles Ferry and nephew of Jules Ferry, Abel continued the family tradition when he was elected in 1909 to represent the Vosges department in the Chamber of Deputies.

Ferry served as Under-Secretary of State for Foreign Affairs from 13 June 1914 to 29 October 1915 in the first and second governments of René Viviani. He was instrumental in moving the bulk of French troops in Morocco to the home front, where they played a decisive role during the First Battle of the Marne. During the same period, he served on the frontlines in the infantry with distinction, as did a number of other French parliamentarians.

Ferry's diaries, published as Carnets secrets 1914-1918, are a valuable source on relations between the French government and its generals during the First World War. Ferry was an early and trenchant critic of army commander Joseph Joffre.

Ferry was a key figure in the Army Commission of the Chamber of Deputies, regularly visiting the armies in the field and reporting back to the Chamber. He was mortally wounded by shellfire while visiting the Aisne front on 8 September 1918 and died a week later. In the meantime, Prime Minister Georges Clemenceau visited Ferry at Jaulzy, in the first aid room where he had been undergoing surgery, to award him the Legion of Honour.

== Family ==
His wife Hélène was instrumental in the posthumous publication of Ferry's Carnets secrets in 1957. His daughter born shortly before his death, Fresnette Pisani-Ferry, named after Ferry's battlefield experience at Fresnes-en-Woëvre, was a historian who ensured the preservation of the family’s archives. Her son from marriage with politician Edgard Pisani, and grandson of Abel, Jean Pisani-Ferry, is a prominent French economist.

== Posthumous works ==
- (in French) La Guerre vue d'en bas et d'en haut, lettres, notes, discours et rapports par Abel Ferry. Grasset, Paris, 1920.
- (in French) Carnets secrets 1914–1918. Introduction by Nicholas Offenstadt, edited by André Loez. Grasset, Paris, 2005.

== See also ==
- Émile Driant
- French Third Republic
