= Zillebeke =

Village in West Flanders, Belgium

Coordinates: 50°50′01″N 2°55′21″E

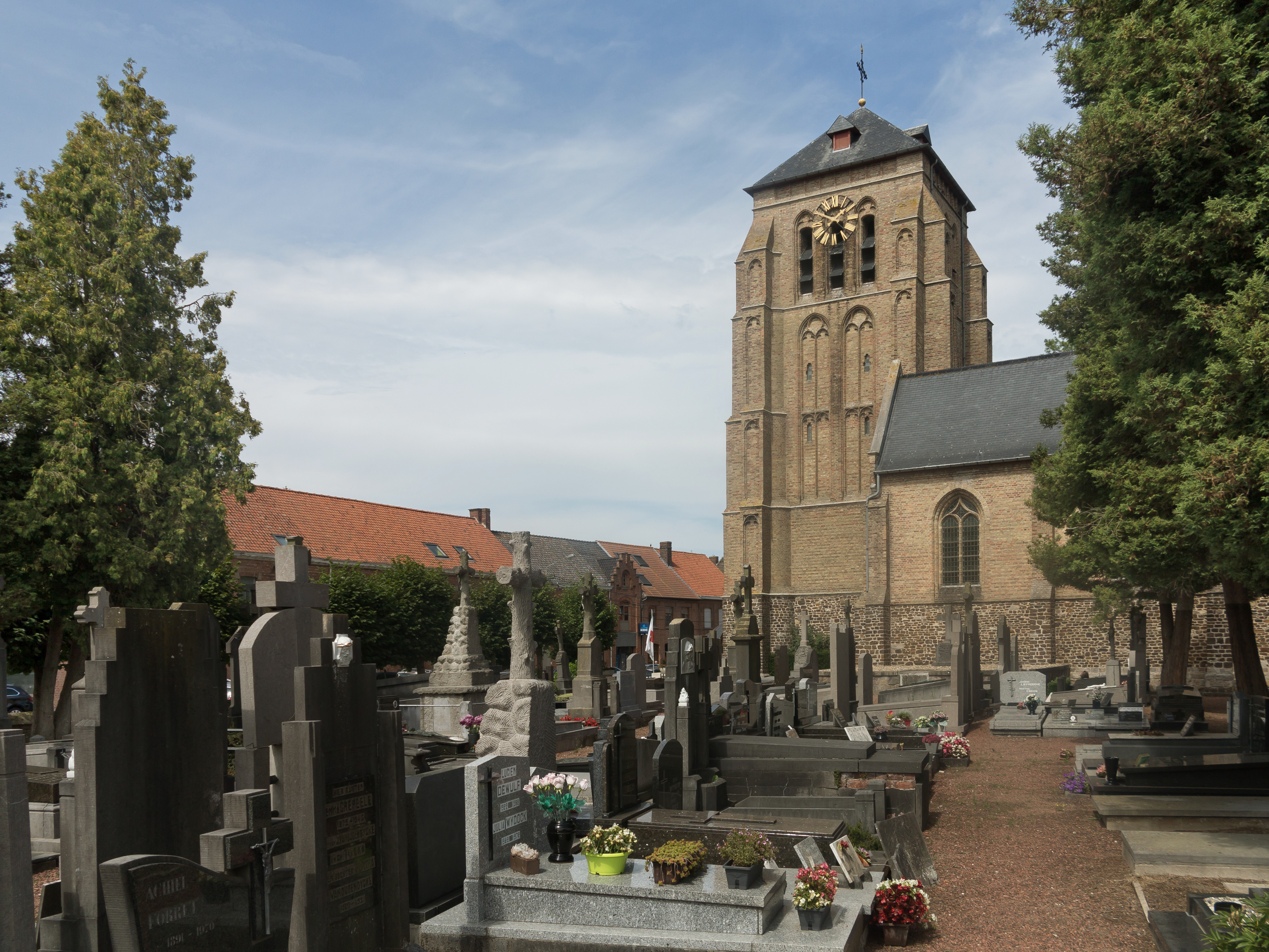
Church: Sint-Catharinakerk

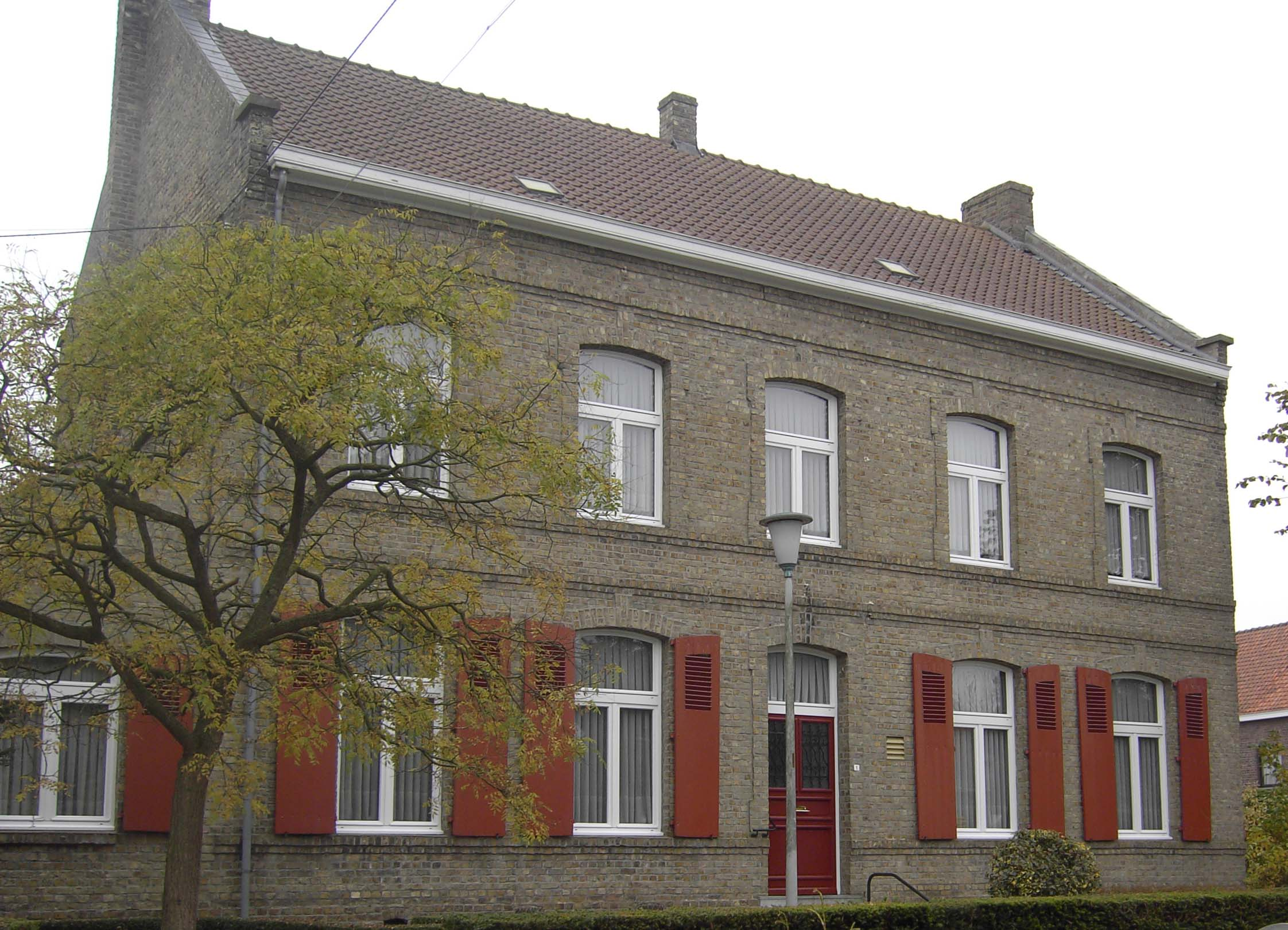
Zillebeke Rectory

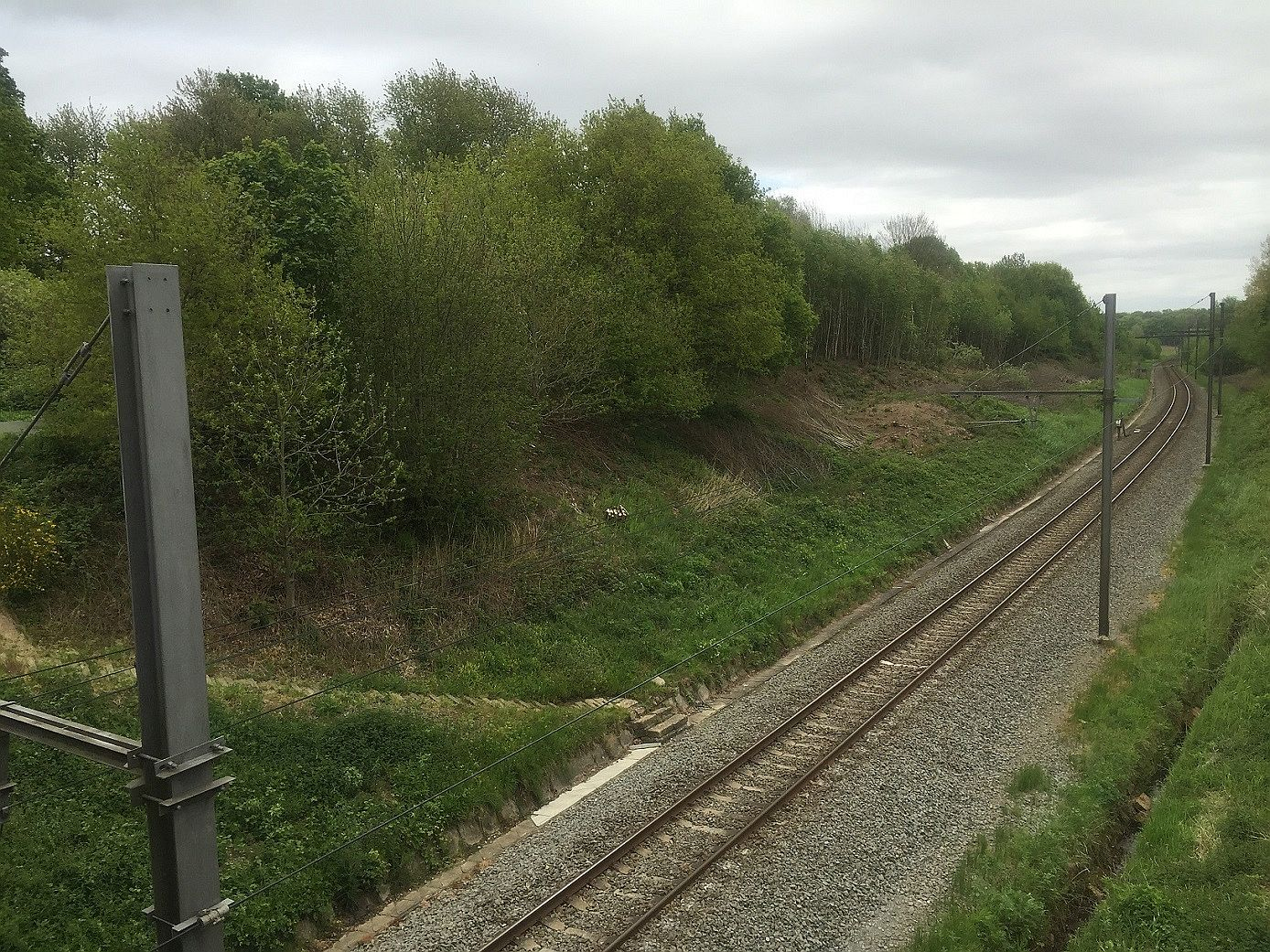
Zillebeke, tracks of Ypres-Comines railway with Hill 60 on the left

Zillebeke (also known as Zellebeck) is a village in the Flemish province of West Flanders in Belgium. It is a former municipality which is now part of Ypres.

== History ==
On 3 March 1914 the then municipality was granted the arms of the last Lords of Zillebeke, the Canton family, Viscounts of Winnezeele, which had in 1740 acquired the Ancien Régime estate of Zillebeke.

During World War I, like other parts of Ypres, it was the site of bipartisan heroism, with Victoria Crosses being won by three soldiers in the area – John Henry Stephen Dimmer, John Franks Vallentin, and John Carmichael. The village was mentioned in the Wipers Times, the most well-known of the trench magazines that were published by soldiers fighting on the front lines of the Great War.

The 1st Battalion of The Irish Guards suffered huge casualties defending the village and playing a major part in stopping the German breakthrough to the Channel Ports between 1 and 11 November 1914 as part of the First Battle of Ypres.

Located in or close to Zillebeke are Hill 60, the Hill 62 Memorial, The Bluff, the Sanctuary Wood Museum Hill 62 and the Sanctuary Wood CWGC Cemetery. Within Zillebeke Churchyard CWGC Cemetery, which forms part of the churchyard at Zillebeke Catholic parish church, there is a section with war graves of soldiers from aristocratic backgrounds; this plot is called The Aristocrat's Cemetery.

The nearby villages of Hollebeke and Voormezele were merged into Zillebeke in 1970. In 1976, the enlarged Zillebeke was merged into the city of Ypres.

== See also ==
- Railway Dugouts Burial Ground (Transport Farm) CWGC Cemetery
- RE Grave Railway Wood CWGC Cemetery
