= Parliamentary War Memorial =

Stone sculpture in Westminster Hall, London, England

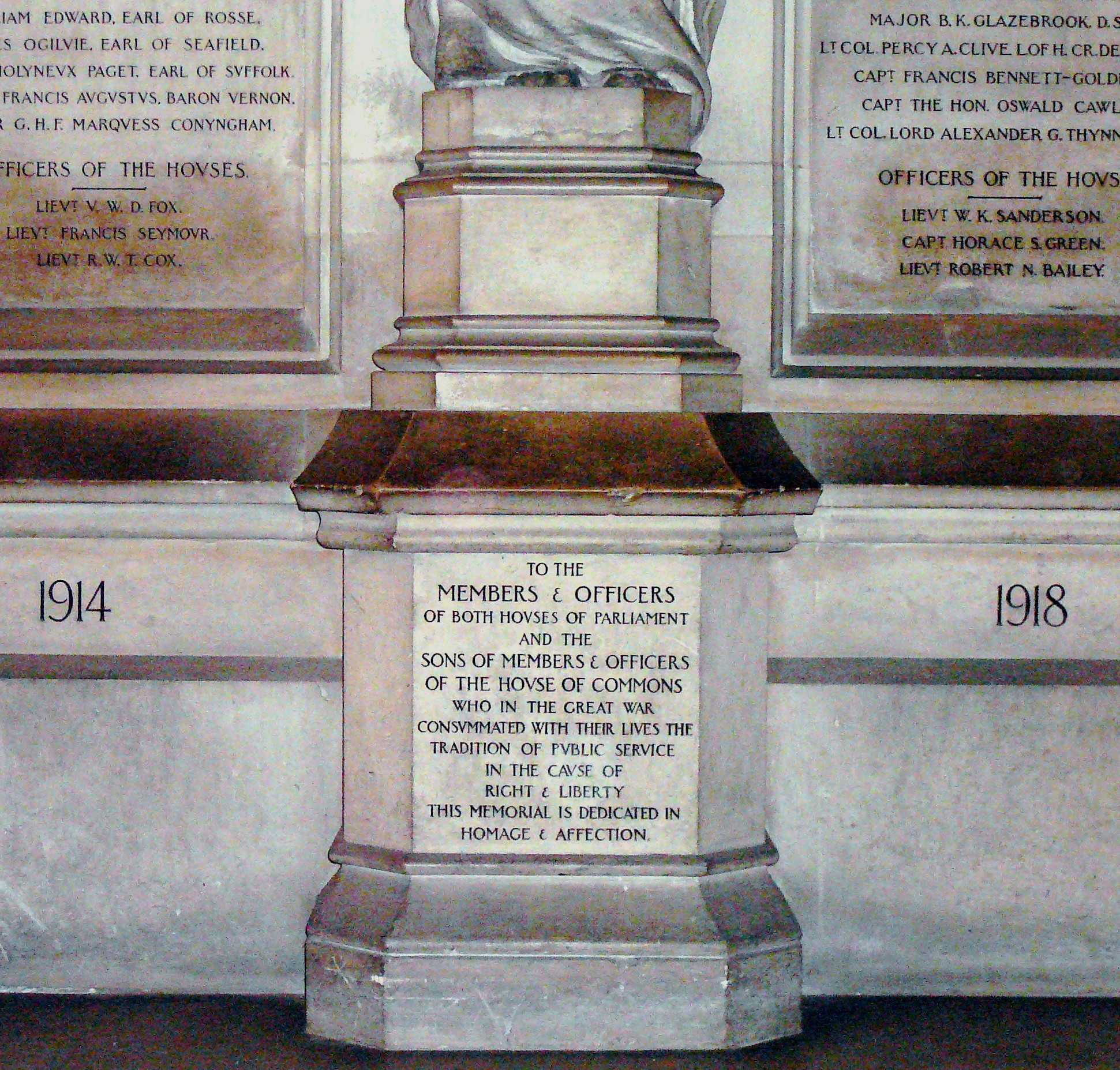
- Inscription below the recording angel

- Location of the monument in Greater London
- Interactive map of Parliamentary War Memorial
- Location: Westminster Hall, London, England
- Coordinates: 51°30′00″N 0°07′31″W
- Designer: Bertram Mackennal
- Type: Sculpture
- Material: Marble; bronze; stone; stained glass
- Beginning date: 1920
- Completion date: 1922; 104 years ago
- Dedicated date: 1922
- Restored date: 1951
- Dedicated to: Members of UK Parliament who died in World War I

The Parliamentary War Memorial, also known as the Recording Angel Memorial, is a stone sculpture in Westminster Hall, unveiled in 1922, which commemorates the members of both Houses of Parliament of the United Kingdom who died in the First World War. It names 22 members of the House of Commons, 20 members of the House of Lords, and 9 senior members of staff, together with another 94 sons of members and officers of the House of Commons, who lost their lives in the war. (Note: Sons of peers and of officers of the House of Lords are commemorated on the wooden panels of the House of Lords War Memorial in the Royal Gallery.) Above the memorial is a large stained glass window which commemorates members and staff of both Houses who died in the Second World War.

== History ==
Planning for the Parliamentary War Memorial began in July 1917. A parliamentary committee chose a site below a large gothic window in St Stephen's Porch, at the south end of Westminster Hall. Designs were sought from Walter Tapper, George Frampton and Bertram Mackennal.

Mackennal, an Australian sculptor, (1863–1931) was chosen, and his design modified an existing Victorian screen by adding the elements that now form the central section of the memorial: a winged figure representing the recording angel, flanked by two arched panels bearing names of the fallen. Mackennal's design also include a cupola above, with a Gothic arch and bronze statuettes of the patron saints of England, Scotland, Ireland and Wales. The two Portland stone panels and angel were inserted into the existing screen of Caen stone in 1921.

Modifications were made in 1922, removing the mullions from the flanking sections of the Victorian screen to insert six further panels, three on either side, to record the names of the sons of MPs and officers of the House of Commons killed in the war. Columns separate the central section from the flanking sections, each topped by a gilt-bronze statuette: one representing the virtue of Faith and the other Fortitude. The extended memorial was unveiled by Edward, Prince of Wales (later Edward VIII) in 1922.

=== Damage during World War II ===
The memorial suffered bomb damage in the Second World War. Early on 27 September 1940, a bomb fell in Old Palace Yard, blowing a hole in the window above the memorial, originally designed by Augustus Pugin. Masonry from the window's tracery fell on the memorial, knocking off the cupola, breaking off the angel's feet, and dislodging several panels of names. There were plans to extend the memorial to include the fallen of the Second World War, but eventually it was decided that a new stained glass window would become the memorial to members and staff of both Houses who died in that War. The new window was designed by Sir Ninian Comper and includes the service badges and armorial bearings or initials of 22 MPs, 34 Peers, and 5 members of staff (including two police officers). After structural repairs to St Stephen's Porch were completed, the restoration was undertaken from 1951. The cupola was left out of the final design, to prevent it obstructing the view of the new window. The bronze statue of St Andrew from the cupola is now in the Parliamentary Art Collection, but the statues of St George, St Patrick and St David have disappeared.

In 2018 former MP Gerald Arbuthnot, who was killed during the Battle of the Somme was added to the memorial, after it was noted he had been accidentally omitted for 96 years.

== Related memorials ==
Further war memorials in the Houses of Parliament include books of remembrance for both Houses of Parliament, a memorial for other members of staff in Chancellors Court, a memorial for Parliamentary journalists in the Press Gallery, and 42 heraldic shields in the House of Commons, one for each MP killed on active service during the World Wars. Shields above the north and south entrances of the Commons Chamber honour Airey Neave and three other MPs who were killed by the Irish Republican Army and Irish National Liberation Army.

== See also ==
- List of British parliamentarians who died in the First World War
