= FitzClarence =

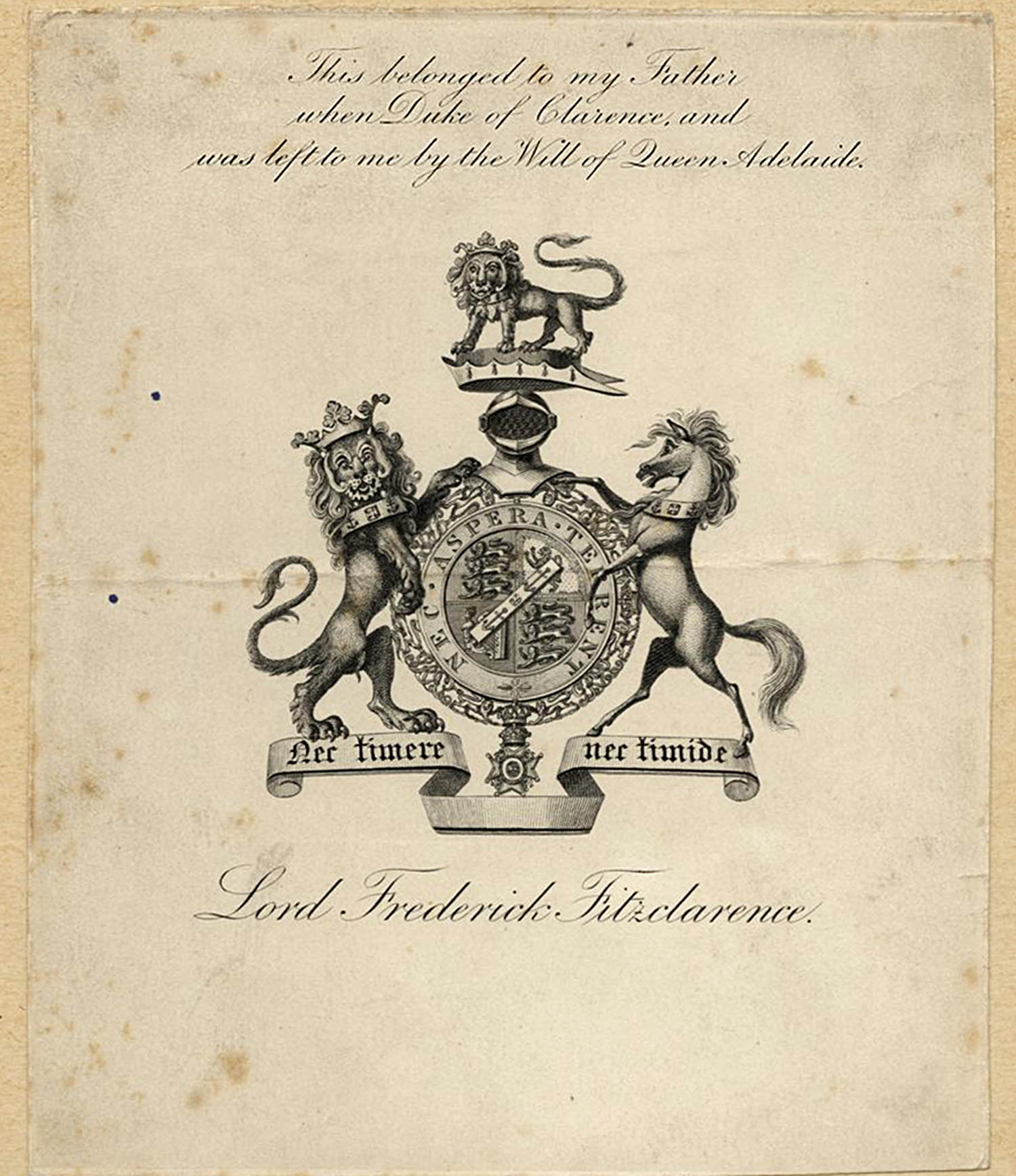
Bookplate showing the arms granted to the Fitzclarences

The FitzClarence family was an illegitimate branch of the House of Hanover. Prince William, Duke of Clarence and St Andrews, who later became King William IV of the United Kingdom, had at least ten children with his mistress Dorothea Jordan, all of whom took the surname FitzClarence. All of them were also granted by their father the rank of a marquess' younger sons or daughters.

The Duke of Clarence's eldest surviving illegitimate child, George FitzClarence (1794–1842), was created Earl of Munster in 1831 and his male-line was continued until the death of the 7th Earl of Munster in 2000. Two of Lord Munster's brothers, Frederick and Augustus (a clergyman), had issue that were also part of the family. Five daughters of William IV and Dorothy Jordan were married to nobles or prominent military figures, including the 18th Earl of Erroll, the 10th Viscount Falkland, and Admiral Lord John Hallyburton. Only one, Mary, had no children.

- The ten children of Prince William, Duke of Clarence and St Andrews, future King of the United Kingdom, and his mistress, Dorothea Jordan, and their descendants:
  - George FitzClarence (1794–1842) and his grandson:
    - Charles FitzClarence (1865–1914)
  - Henry FitzClarence (1795–1817)
  - Sophia FitzClarence (1796–1837)
  - Mary FitzClarence (1798–1864)
  - Frederick FitzClarence (1799–1854)
  - Elizabeth FitzClarence (1801–1856)
  - Adolphus FitzClarence (rear admiral) (1802–1856) (no issue)
  - Augusta FitzClarence (1803–1865)
  - Augustus FitzClarence (1805–1854)
  - Amelia FitzClarence (1807–1858)
- William FitzClarence, 2nd Earl of Munster (1824–1901)
- Geoffrey FitzClarence, 3rd Earl of Munster (1859–1902)
- Aubrey FitzClarence, 4th Earl of Munster (1862–1928)
- Geoffrey FitzClarence, 5th Earl of Munster (1906–1975)
- Edward FitzClarence, 6th Earl of Munster (1899–1983)
- Anthony FitzClarence, 7th Earl of Munster (1926–2000)
