= John Kennedy-Erskine =

The Honourable John Kennedy-Erskine of Dun
- Born: John Kennedy; 4 June 1802
- Died: 3 June 1831 (aged 29); Pisa, Grand Duchy of Tuscany
- Spouse: Lady Augusta FitzClarence (m. 1827; died 1831)
- Children: William Henry Kennedy-Erskine; Wilhelmina FitzClarence, Countess of Munster; Millicent Erskine-Wemyss
- Parent(s): Archibald Kennedy, 1st Marquess of Ailsa; Margaret Erskine of Dun
- Relatives: Violet Jacob (granddaughter); Geoffrey FitzClarence, 3rd Earl of Munster (grandson); Aubrey FitzClarence, 4th Earl of Munster (grandson); Randolph Wemyss (grandson); Rosslyn Wemyss, 1st Baron Wester Wemyss (grandson)

The Honourable John Kennedy-Erskine of Dun (né Kennedy; 4 June 1802 – 6 March 1831) was an English landowner who married a daughter of King William IV.

== Early life ==
Kennedy-Erskine was born on 4 June 1802. He was the son of Archibald Kennedy, 1st Marquess of Ailsa and Margaret Erskine of Dun. Among his siblings were Archibald Kennedy, Earl of Cassillis, Lady Anne Kennedy (wife of Sir David Baird, 2nd Baronet), Lady Mary Kennedy (wife of Richard Oswald), Lady Margaret Kennedy (wife of Thomas Radclyffe-Livingstone-Eyre), and Lady Alicia Jane Kennedy (wife of Jonathan Peel, Secretary of State for War).

His paternal grandparents were Archibald Kennedy, 11th Earl of Cassillis, and, his second wife, Anne Watts (a daughter of Scottish-American businessman John Watts). His grandfather was previously married to Katherine Schuyler (only child and heiress of Col. Peter Schuyler of King George's War). Through his elder brother, he was uncle to Archibald Kennedy, who later succeeded Kennedy-Erskine's father as the 2nd Marquess of Ailsa in 1846. His maternal grandparents were John Erskine and Mary Baird of Newbyth (eldest daughter of the late William Baird, Esq.).

== Career ==
Kennedy-Erskine served as a captain with the 16th Lancers, and was made an equerry to his father-in-law, King William IV, in 1830.

In 1824, after inheriting the Dun estate in Angus, Scotland from his unmarried aunt, he assumed the additional name of Erskine and who matriculated Arms at the Lyon Office in 1828. The manor house, known as the House of Dun, was designed by William Adam and was finished in 1743. His wife was responsible for some internal re-modeling of the House. The House remained in the family until 1980 when their descendant, Millicent Lovett, the last Laird of Dun, who bequeathed it to the National Trust for Scotland upon her death.

== Personal life ==
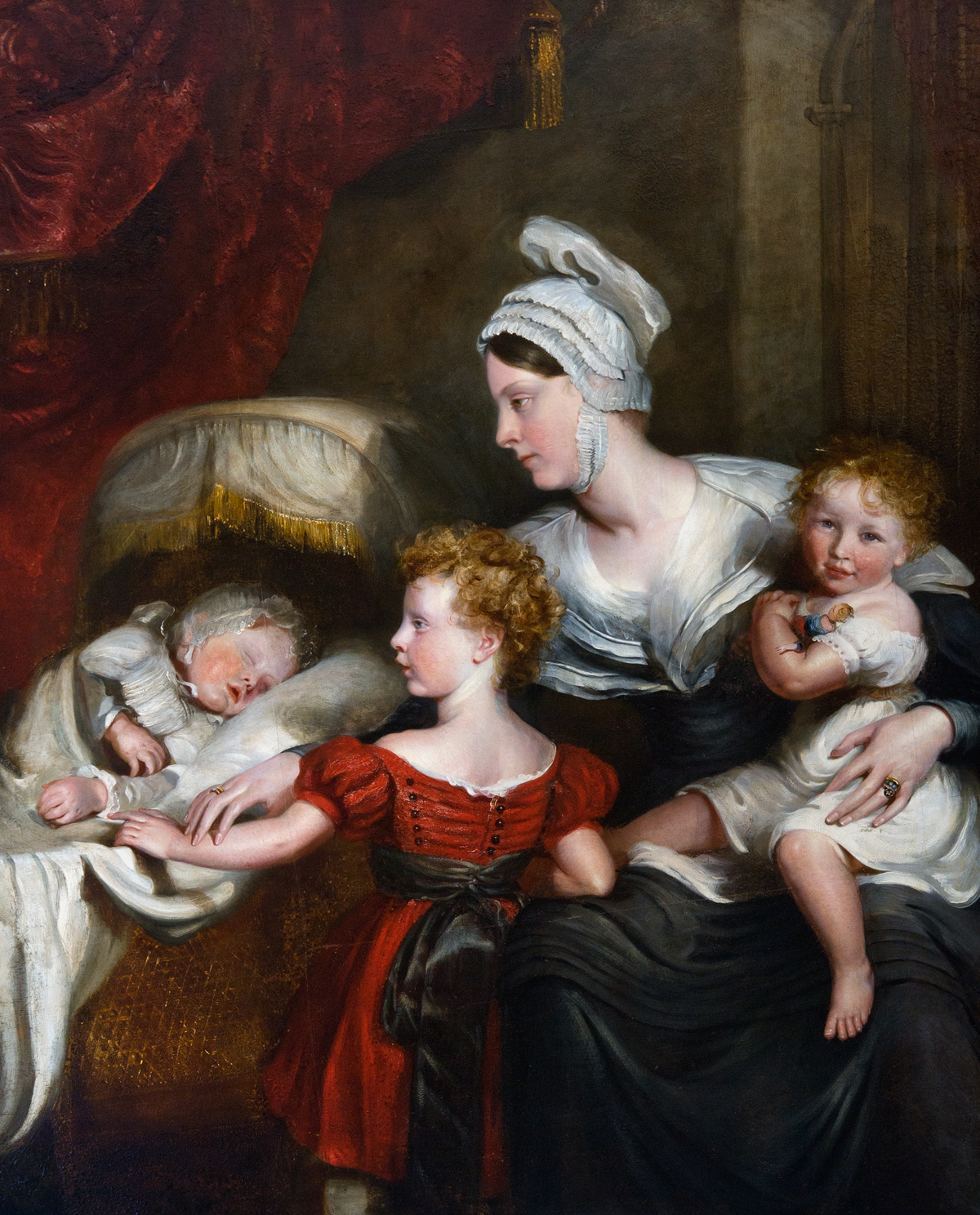
Portrait of his wife, Lady Augusta with their three children, by John Hayter, c. 1830

On 5 July 1827, Kennedy-Erskine married Lady Augusta FitzClarence (1803–1865). The fourth illegitimate daughter of King William IV and Dorothea Jordan, Augusta grew up at their Bushy House residence in Teddington and had four sisters and five brothers all surnamed FitzClarence. Soon after their father became monarch in June 1830, the FitzClarence children were raised to the ranks of younger children of a marquess. Together, they were the parents of:

- William Henry Kennedy-Erskine (1828–1870), a Captain in the 17th Lancers; he married Catherine Jones, daughter of William Jones of Henllys, Carmarthenshire, in 1862.
- Wilhelmina "Mina" Kennedy-Erskine (1830–1906), who married his first cousin, William FitzClarence, 2nd Earl of Munster, son of George FitzClarence, 1st Earl of Munster and Mary Wyndham (an illegitimate daughter of the 3rd Earl of Egremont), in 1855.
- Augusta Anne "Millicent" Mary Kennedy-Erskine (1831–1895), who married James Hay Erskine-Wemyss, son of Rear-Admiral James Erskine Wemyss and Lady Emma Hay (a daughter of the 17th Earl of Erroll), in 1855.

Kennedy-Erskine died at Pisa in the Grand Duchy of Tuscany on 6 March 1831 at just 28 years old. After his death, his widow married Lord Frederick Gordon-Hallyburton, the third son of George Gordon, 9th Marquess of Huntly.

=== Descendants ===
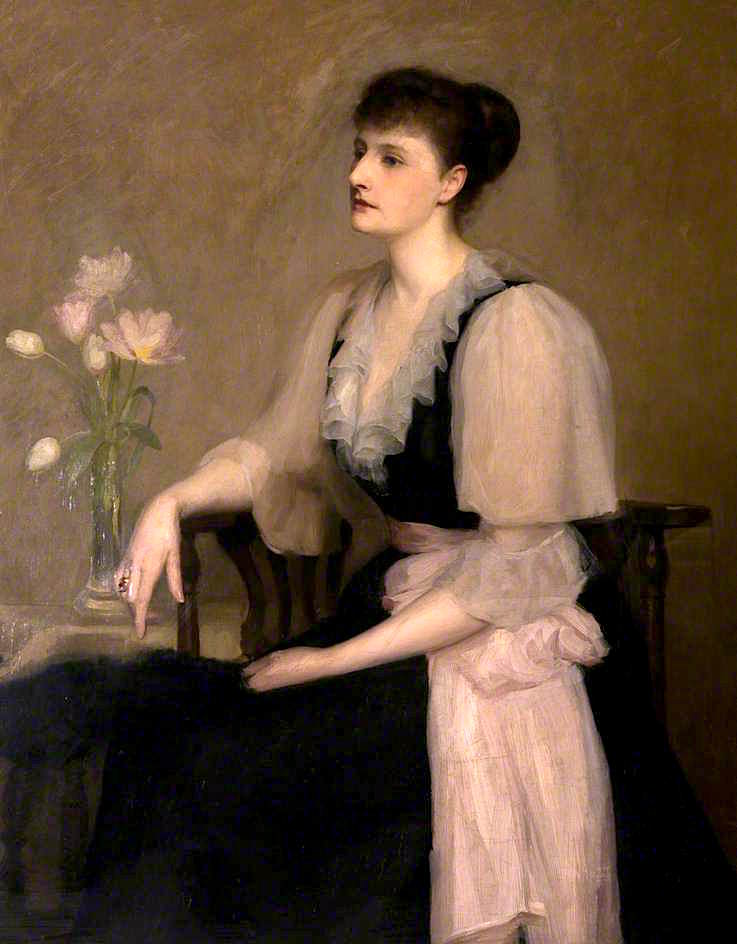
Portrait of his granddaughter Violet Jacob, by Henry Harris Brown

Through his son William, he was posthumously a grandfather of the writer and poet Violet Augusta Mary Frederica Kennedy-Erskine (1863–1946), a writer who married Arthur Otway Jacob, an Irish major in the British Army.

Through his eldest daughter Mina, he was posthumously a grandfather of Major Geoffrey FitzClarence, 3rd Earl of Munster, Aubrey FitzClarence, 4th Earl of Munster, and Hon. Harold Edward FitzClarence (father of Geoffrey FitzClarence, 5th Earl of Munster).

Through his youngest daughter Millicent, he was posthumously a grandfather of Mary Frances Erskine Wemyss (who married Cecil Stratford Paget, a son of Gen. Lord George Paget), Dora Mina Erskine Wemyss (who married Lord Henry Grosvenor, third son of the 1st Duke of Westminster), Randolph Gordon Erskine Wemyss (who inherited Wemyss Castle), Hugo Erskine Wemyss (Comptroller of the Grand Duchess of Mecklenburg's household in Britain), and Rosslyn Wemyss, 1st Baron Wester Wemyss.
