= Lord Frederick Gordon-Hallyburton =

Scottish Royal Navy Admiral and Member of Parliament (1799–1878)

Admiral Lord John Frederick Gordon Hallyburton, GCH (15 August 1799 – 29 September 1878) was a Scottish naval officer and Member of Parliament.

== Life and career ==
He was born the Honourable John Frederick Gordon, third son of George Gordon, 5th Earl of Aboyne by his wife Catherine Anne, daughter of Sir Charles Cope, 2nd Baronet. On 28 May 1836 his father succeeded as 9th Marquess of Huntly. He reached the rank of Captain in the Royal Navy on 4 August 1836.

On 24 August 1836 Gordon was married to Lady Augusta Kennedy-Erskine (17 June 1803 – 8 December 1865), widow since 6 April 1831 of the Hon. John Kennedy Erskine of Dun, second son of Archibald Kennedy, 1st Marquess of Ailsa. She was born Augusta FitzClarence, the fourth daughter of King William IV by the actress Dorothea Jordan, and had been raised to the rank of a Marquess's daughter on 24 May 1831. By this marriage he gained three step-children:

- William Henry Kennedy Erskine (1 July 1828 – 5 September 1870), who inherited the House of Dun in Forfarshire and served as a captain in the 17th Lancers. He married Catherine Jones on 18 November 1862 and had issue, including the writer Violet Jacob.
- Wilhelmina Kennedy Erskine (26 June 1830 – 9 October 1906), who married William George FitzClarence, 2nd Earl of Munster on 17 April 1855 and had issue.
- Augusta Millicent Anne Mary Kennedy Erskine (11 May 1831 – 11 February 1895), who married James Hay Wemyss on 17 April 1855 and had issue.

They had no children of their own. Gordon was made a Knight Grand Cross in the civil division of the Royal Guelphic Order on 22 August 1836 and a Lord of the Bedchamber to the King on 26 October that year.

In the general election of 1841 Gordon was elected to Parliament for Forfarshire, succeeding his uncle Lord Douglas Gordon-Hallyburton. He also inherited his uncle's estates, and assumed the additional surname of Hallyburton in 1843. He was made a Deputy Lieutenant for Forfarshire on 5 June 1847 and re-elected for the county in the general election of that year. He remained in Parliament until the 1852 election, when he was replaced by Lauderdale Maule.

Gordon-Hallyburton was promoted to Rear-Admiral on the Reserve Half Pay List on 12 May 1857, and promoted in the same list to Vice-Admiral on 4 November 1863 and full Admiral on 8 April 1868.

He lived at Hallyburton House near Coupar Angus.

== See also ==
- O'Byrne, William Richard (1849). "Hallyburton, John Frederick Gordon" . A Naval Biographical Dictionary . John Murray – via Wikisource.

Parliament of the United Kingdom
Preceded by Lord Douglas Gordon-Hallyburton	Member of Parliament for Forfarshire; 1841 – 1852	Succeeded by Lauderdale Maule
