= Aubrey FitzClarence, 4th Earl of Munster =

English aristocrat (1862–1928)

The Right Honourable The Earl of Munster
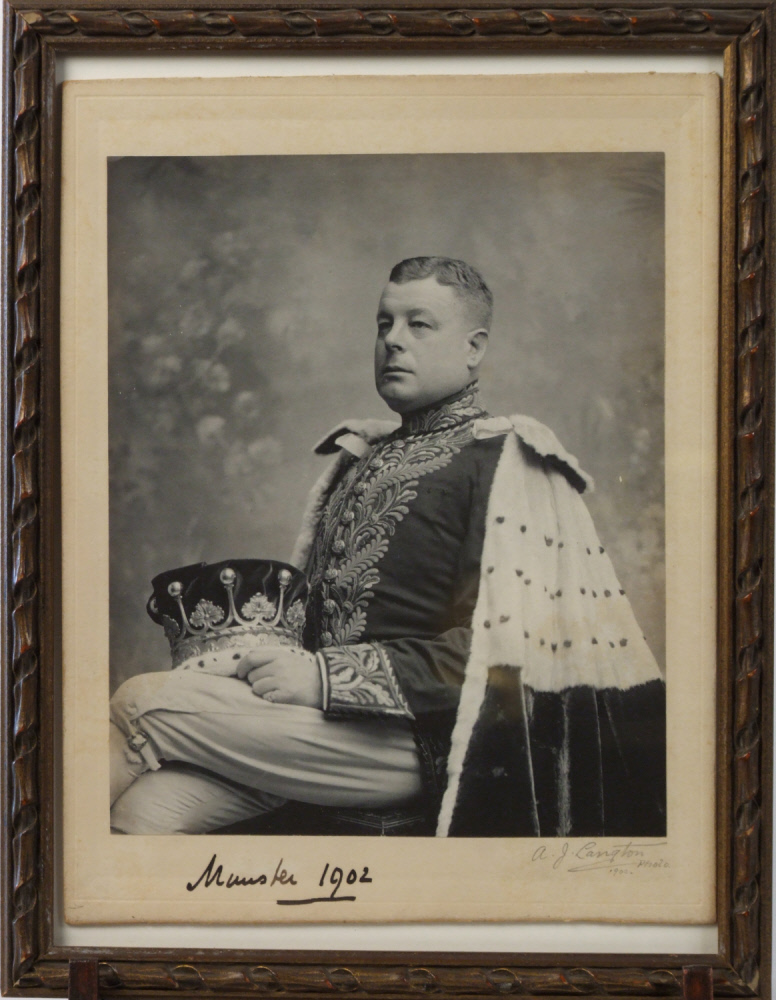
- Born: Aubrey FitzClarence; 7 June 1862; Kensington, London, England
- Died: 1 January 1928 (aged 65); Kettering, Northamptonshire, England
- Father: William FitzClarence, 2nd Earl of Munster
- Mother: Wilhelmina Kennedy-Erskine

Aubrey FitzClarence, 4th Earl of Munster (7 June 1862 – 1 January 1928) was an English aristocrat and a great-grandson of King William IV by his mistress Dorothea Jordan.

== Early life ==
Aubrey FitzClarence was born in Kensington, London, a son of William FitzClarence, 2nd Earl of Munster (1824–1901) and Wilhelmina Kennedy-Erskine (1830–1906). His parents were first cousins, thus making Aubrey a great-grandson of William IV twice over.

His paternal grandparents were George FitzClarence, 1st Earl of Munster and Mary Wyndham (an illegitimate daughter of the 3rd Earl of Egremont). His maternal grandparents were Lady Augusta FitzClarence and, her first husband, the Hon. John Kennedy-Erskine (a son of the Marquess of Ailsa). His paternal grandfather and his maternal grandmother were brother and sister.

== Peerage ==
When their father died in 1901, Aubrey's elder brother, Geoffrey FitzClarence, 3rd Earl of Munster, inherited the Munster earldom and the subsidiary titles of Viscount FitzClarence and Lord Tewkesbury. However, Geoffrey was serving in the British Army in South Africa at the time and he died nine months later without ever having returned to England.

When the 3rd Earl died childless in 1902, the earldom and other titles were inherited by Aubrey. Aubrey had held the office of Gentleman Usher-in-Ordinary to Queen Victoria from 1885 to 1901 and to King Edward VII from 23 July 1901 until 7 February 1902, shortly after inheriting the earldom. At that time, Aubrey resigned the office.

== Personal life ==
Aubrey died unmarried at the age of 65, at which point his nephew, Geoffrey FitzClarence, became the 5th Earl of Munster.

Peerage of the United Kingdom
Preceded by Geoffrey FitzClarence	Earl of Munster; 1902–1928	Succeeded by Geoffrey FitzClarence
