= Wilhelmina FitzClarence, Countess of Munster =

British peeress and novelist (1830–1906)

The Right Honourable The Countess of Munster
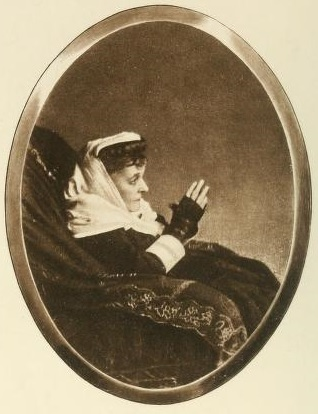
- The Countess of Munster as portrayed on the frontispiece of her autobiography (published 1904)
- Born: Wilhelmina Kennedy-Erskine; 27 June 1830; Dun House, Montrose, Scotland
- Died: 9 October 1906 (aged 76)
- Noble family: FitzClarence
- Spouse: William FitzClarence, 2nd Earl of Munster (m. 1855; died 1901)
- Issue: Edward, Viscount FitzClarence; Hon. Lionel Frederick Archibald; Geoffrey FitzClarence, 3rd Earl of Munster; Hon. Arthur Falkland Manners; Aubrey FitzClarence, 4th Earl of Munster; Hon. William George; Hon. Harold Edward; Lady Lillian Boyd; Lady Dorothea Lee-Warner
- Father: Hon. John Kennedy-Erskine
- Mother: Lady Augusta FitzClarence
- Occupation: Peeress, novelist

Wilhelmina FitzClarence, Countess of Munster (née Kennedy-Erskine; 27 June 1830 – 9 October 1906) was a British peeress and novelist. Her mother, Lady Augusta FitzClarence, was an illegitimate daughter of King William IV; Wilhelmina, also known as Mina, was born the day after William's succession as monarch. She travelled as a young girl throughout Europe, visiting the courts of France and Hanover. In 1855, Mina married her first cousin William FitzClarence, 2nd Earl of Munster; they had nine children, including the 3rd and 4th Earls of Munster.

The Earl and Countess of Munster lived at Palmeira Square in Brighton. Later in life, Lady Munster became a novelist and short story writer. In 1889, she released her first novel, Dorinda; a second, A Scotch Earl, followed two years later. The year 1896 saw the publication of Ghostly Tales, a collection of tales on the supernatural which have largely been forgotten today. Lady Munster also produced an autobiography entitled My Memories and Miscellanies, which was released in 1904. She died two years later.

== Family and early life ==
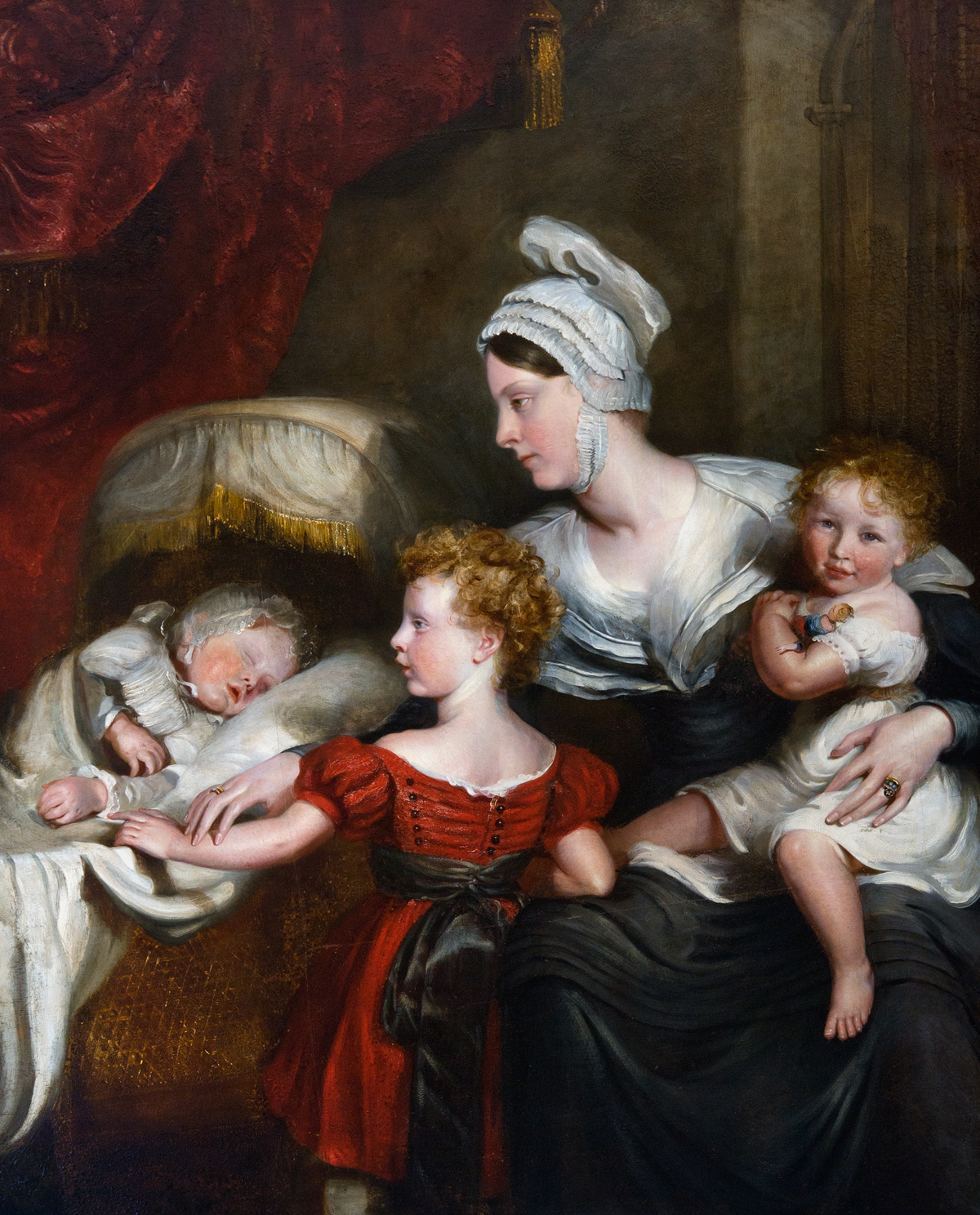
Wilhelmina (right) with her mother Lady Augusta and two siblings. Painted by John Hayter, c. 1831

Wilhelmina "Mina" Kennedy-Erskine was born on 27 June 1830 in the House of Dun, Montrose, Scotland. She was the second child of the Hon. John Kennedy-Erskine and his wife Lady Augusta FitzClarence, an illegitimate daughter of King William IV (who became monarch the day before Mina's birth). Her father, the second son of the 13th Earl of Cassilis, was a captain with the 16th Lancers and an equerry to King William before dying in 1831 at the age of 28. Her paternal grandmother, Anne Watts, was a descendant of the Schuyler family, the Van Cortlandt family (including Stephanus Van Cortlandt), and the Delancey family of British North America.

Mina lived with her widowed mother and two siblings in a "charming brick house" on the River Thames called Railshead, which was next door to a house owned by her paternal grandparents. King William visited the family often and was quite fond of Mina; on one occasion, he visited to comfort his daughter when three- or four-year-old Mina nearly died of a "very dangerous brain fever". The Kennedy-Erskines also often visited Windsor Castle during the king's reign.

Five years after Kennedy-Erskine's death, Lady Augusta married Lord Frederick Gordon-Hallyburton, a decision that displeased her first husband's parents. The decision led to Lady Augusta's departure from Railshead. In 1837 she became State Housekeeper at Kensington Palace after the death of her sister, Lady De L'Isle. Mina lived there until she married. She and her sister Millicent enjoyed music and had a particular love for the Italian soprano Marietta Alboni. The sisters' Italian singing-master secretly arranged for a meeting with Alboni, but the encounter did not go well; the singer discovered that they were the daughters of the "housekeeper", and, assuming that they were not ladies, departed soon after.

In the late 1840s, Mina travelled through Europe with her family so that they might "learn languages and finish [their] education". The trip started in 1847, when Mina journeyed to Dresden due to her mother's desire for her daughters to learn German. From 1847 to 1849, she and her family lived in Paris near the Arc de Triomphe, and were kindly received by the French Royal Family headed by Louis Philippe I and Queen Marie Amelie. They left soon after the king and queen's fall from power, as the city had suddenly become unsafe for those of their rank. In 1850, they visited the court of Hanover and were received by Ernest Augustus, King of Hanover and his family; later that year, they returned to Kensington Palace and Mina and Millicent came out in society.

== Marriage ==
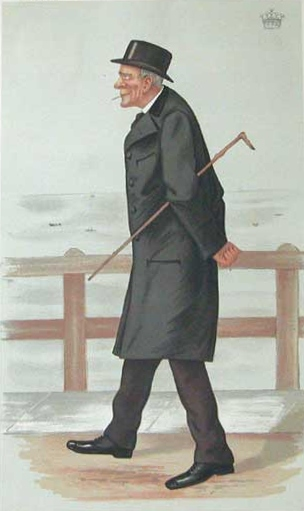
The Earl of Munster as caricatured by Spy (Leslie Ward) in Vanity Fair, February 1882

Mina married her first cousin William FitzClarence, 2nd Earl of Munster at Wemyss Castle on 17 April 1855 in a double wedding in which her sister Millicent married James Hay Erskine Wemyss. Like Mina, FitzClarence was a grandchild of William IV; at a young age, he had succeeded his father the 1st Earl, who served as a governor of Windsor Castle and constable of the Round Tower until his suicide in 1842. The FitzClarences travelled to Hamburg immediately after the wedding, visiting local schlosses and the family of Prince Christian of Schleswig-Holstein (who later married The Princess Helena). Their first child, Edward, was born within a year. The couple would have nine children, four of whom outlived their mother:

- Edward, Viscount FitzClarence (29 March 1856 – 1870)
- Hon. Lionel Frederick Archibald (24 July 1857 – 24 March 1863)
- Geoffrey FitzClarence, 3rd Earl of Munster (18 July 1859 – 2 February 1902); died without issue
- Hon. Arthur Falkland Manners (18 October 1860 – 1861)
- Aubrey FitzClarence, 4th Earl of Munster (7 June 1862 – 1 January 1928); died without issue
- Hon. William George (17 September 1864 – 4 October 1899); married Charlotte Elizabeth Williams
- Hon. Harold Edward (15 November 1870 – 28 August 1926); married Frances Isabel Eleanor Keppel; their son was the 5th Earl of Munster
- Lady Lillian Adelaide Katherine Mary (10 December 1873 – 15 July 1948); married Captain William Arthur Boyd
- Lady Dorothea Augusta (5 May 1876 – 1942); married Major Chandos Brydges Lee-Warner

The Earl and Countess of Munster lived at Palmeira Square in Brighton. According to an article in contemporary women's magazine The Lady's Realm, the Countess lived a very quiet life. In 1897, the magazine reported that she had lived in retirement in Brighton for the past thirty-five years. Her attachment to the city, the article suggested, was due to childhood memories of visiting there with King William. The article also stated that because Lord Munster's health was failing, the Countess was living in "comparative seclusion", though her lifestyle was also attributed to a love of a "quiet, literary, and artistic life". She died on 9 October 1906, having been widowed five years.

== Literary career ==
Later in life, Lady Munster became a novelist and short story writer, writing under the title the Countess of Munster. At the age of nearly sixty, she published two novels; her first, Dorinda, in 1889, and her second, A Scotch Earl, in 1891. The plot of Dorinda centred on a young woman who eventually kills herself after stealing works of art from her friends. Oscar Wilde noted Munster's skill in writing Dorinda; he compared the "exceedingly clever" novel's eponymous heroine to "a sort of well-born" Becky Sharp, and praised the author's ability "to draw ... in a few sentences the most lifelike portraits of social types and social exceptions". In 1888, an article by Munster about ballad singing appeared in The Woman's World, a Victorian women's magazine edited by Wilde. A Scotch Earl, which centred on a vulgar Scottish nobleman named Lord Invergordon, was less well received by contemporaries. The Spectator published a critical review soon after its publication which suggested that the novel's showering of "contempt upon the society of wealth and rank" was close to Republicanism or Socialism. The review criticised A Scotch Earl for lacking "any merits of construction or style", and added that Lady Munster was "not and never will be a capable novelist".

In 1896, Munster released Ghostly Tales, a collection of stories "written in a manner similar to accounts of true hauntings". Lady's Realm considered her stories to be based on fact. A positive review of Ghostly Tales was published in the Saturday Review in 1897, in which the stories were described as "entertaining and dramatic", but it was noted that not all were based on supernatural events. Hugh Lamb included the Countess's "surprisingly grim" story "The Tyburn Ghost" in his 1979 edited volume Tales from a Gas-Lit Graveyard. He wrote at the time that Lady Munster's works had been "completely overlooked by bibliophiles and anthologists since her death". Lamb deemed this regrettable, as he considered Ghostly Tales "possibly her best work" and one of the "truly representative collections of Victorian ghost stories". Lamb also included another of her stories, "The Page-Boy's Ghost", in a 1988 anthology. However, modern author and editor Douglas A. Anderson has called the Countess's stories "standard, melodramatic fare", which are "perfectly forgettable".

In 1904, Lady Munster produced an autobiography entitled My Memories and Miscellanies. In its foreword, she explained that "some valued friends" convinced her to write it, despite her reluctance, because her "long life" had witnessed "not a few interesting events". The book was called her "chief work" in The Manchester Guardian at the time of her death in 1906. The Countess wrote the entire book by memory, and expressed regret that she had given up her journal writing as a young girl after someone else improperly read it. The autobiography included several recounted sightings of the female ghost "Green Jean" at Wemyss Castle; Lady Munster claimed that several members of her family, including Millicent, saw the ghost while staying there.

== Ancestry ==
Ancestors of Wilhelmina FitzClarence, Countess of Munster

16. Archibald Kennedy
8. Archibald Kennedy, 11th Earl of Cassilis
4. Archibald Kennedy, 1st Marquess of Ailsa
18. John Watts
9. Anne Watts
19. Ann DeLancey
2. Hon. John Kennedy-Erskine
20. John Erskine of Dunard
10. John Erskine
5. Margaret Erskine
22. William Baird
11. Mary Baird
23. Alicia Johnston
1. Wilhelmina Kennedy-Erskine
24. Frederick, Prince of Wales
12. George III of the United Kingdom
25. Princess Augusta of Saxe-Gotha
6. William IV of the United Kingdom
26. Duke Charles Louis Frederick of Mecklenburg-Strelitz
13. Duchess Charlotte of Mecklenburg-Strelitz
27. Princess Elisabeth Albertine of Saxe-Hildburghausen
3. Lady Augusta FitzClarence
28. James Bland
14. Francis Bland
29. Lucy Brewster
7. Dorothea Bland
15. Grace Phillips
