= Geoffrey FitzClarence =

Geoffrey FitzClarence may refer to:

- Geoffrey FitzClarence, 3rd Earl of Munster, British peer
- Geoffrey FitzClarence, 5th Earl of Munster, British peer and politician
