= Anthony FitzClarence, 7th Earl of Munster =

British graphic designer

The Right Honourable The Earl of Munster FRSA

Member of the House of Lords
- Lord Temporal
- Hereditary peerage 15 November 1983 – 11 November 1999
- Preceded by: Edward FitzClarence, 6th Earl of Munster
- Succeeded by: Seat abolished (Note: Pursuant to the House of Lords Act 1999.)

Personal details
- Born: Anthony Charles FitzClarence; 21 March 1926 Guildford, Surrey, England
- Died: 30 December 2000 (aged 74)
- Spouses: Louise Margaret Diane Delvigne (m. 1949; div. 1966) Pamela Margaret Spooner (m. 1966; div. 1979) Dorothy Alexa Maxwell (m. 1979; died 1995) Halina Winska (m. 1997)
- Children: Lady Tara Heffler; Lady Finola Poynton; Charlotte Burt; Lady Georgina FitzClarence
- Parents: Edward FitzClarence, 6th Earl of Munster (father); Monica Grayson (mother)

Anthony Charles FitzClarence, 7th Earl of Munster, FRSA (21 March 1926 – 30 December 2000) was the last Earl of Munster, Viscount FitzClarence and Baron Tewkesbury. The Earl of Munster was the last of the male line of FitzClarences that began with King William IV (Duke of Clarence until his accession in 1830) and his mistress, the comic actress Dorothea Jordan (née Bland).

The King's eldest son by Mrs Jordan, George FitzClarence, was created Earl of Munster in 1831. He was granted arms at the same time, consisting of the royal arms of the United Kingdom surmounted by a baton sinister charged with anchors, as a mark of bastardy. The seventh earl made his way in the world without trading on his lineage, working variously as a publican, a graphic designer on newspapers, and latterly as an expert on medieval stained glass.

On 15 November 1983, he inherited the earldom on the death of his father Edward FitzClarence, 6th Earl of Munster. From then until the Government's expulsion of the hereditary peers in 1999, as part of the House of Lords Act 1999, he was a regular attender at the House of Lords. For a short time he sat on the cross benches, but soon moved to the Conservative side of the House. A shy man, he spoke rarely there.

== Early life, education and military service ==
Anthony Charles FitzClarence was born as the only son of Edward FitzClarence (1899–1983) and Monica Grayson (died 1958). He had a younger sister, Mary (1928–1971). His father succeeded as the 6th Earl of Munster in 1975 on the death of his second cousin, Geoffrey FitzClarence, the 5th Earl, formerly Paymaster-General in Neville Chamberlain's administration. Anthony's grandfather, Brigadier-General Charles FitzClarence, had won a VC serving with the Royal Fusiliers at Mafeking, and was married to Lady Violet Spencer-Churchill, which made Anthony's father a second cousin of Winston Churchill.

Anthony was sent to St Edward's School, Oxford, before further private education in Switzerland. He was intensely patriotic, and in 1942, aged 16, he volunteered for the Royal Navy, serving for the remainder of the war as a rating on the carrier HMS Illustrious. He was wounded in action, and went on Illustrious to the Mediterranean Sea and the Far East.

His fluent French was put to practical use in Ceylon when, with some French sailors, he negotiated for his shipmates a substantial exchange of "Pusser's rum" for claret. He left the Navy for reasons of ill health in 1947, but afterwards enjoyed sailing.

== Career ==
Requiring an income, FitzClarence began to look for work in which he could express his artistic talent and, after training at the Central School of Arts and Crafts in London, in 1950 he became a graphic designer. From 1957 until 1966 he worked for the Daily Mirror newspaper group, and then from 1966 until 1969 was in the publicity department of the old Sun newspaper, before its takeover by Rupert Murdoch.

After being made redundant in 1969, he continued to work as a freelance designer for another decade. He became Viscount FitzClarence in 1975 on the succession of his father to the earldom. In 1979, he briefly became the landlord of a pub in Haslemere, Surrey. He then joined the staff of the Burrell Collection in Glasgow as a stained glass conservator.

He had already developed an interest in heraldic glass engraving, and initially his job was to ensure that the medieval stained glass panels selected for exhibition were in good condition. But his skill at arranging displays meant that he was soon put in charge of designing the collection's entire display of stained glass, which contained both small panels and a group of larger pieces, including entire windows. These he integrated into the structure of the building, illuminating them with natural light.

He left the Burrell Collection soon after it had opened to the public in 1983, and from 1983 until 1989 worked at the Chapel Studio, a leading firm of stained glass designers and conservators. Latterly, he had begun to create a digital archive of thousands of photographs of examples of stained glass.

Lord Munster, as he had become in 1983, was well liked by his fellow peers at the House of Lords, where he took an interest in issues such as museum funding, defence matters and osteoporosis. For many years he was a member of the House of Lords Yacht Club, competing in matches against the House of Commons. He was a Fellow of the Royal Society of Arts.

== Marriages and issue ==
On 28 July 1949, FitzClarence married firstly Louise Margaret Diane Delvigne. They had two daughters before their divorce in 1966:

- Lady Tara Francesca FitzClarence (born 6 August 1952), former Director of Sotheby's, married Ross Jean Heffler in 1979. They had two children:
  - Alexandra Louise Heffler (born 1982), married James Henry Southall Bradley.
  - Leo Edward Michael Heffler (born 1985).
- Lady Finola Dominique FitzClarence (born 6 December 1953), married Jonathan Terence Poynton in 1981. They had two children:
  - Chloë Nona Poynton (born 1982).
  - Oliver Maximilian Christopher Poynton (born 1984).

On 18 June 1966 FitzClarence married secondly Pamela Margaret Spooner. They had two daughters before their divorce in 1979:

- Oonagh Sarah FitzClarence (born 1964), born before her parents' marriage and adopted by John and Rowena Lawrence Mills when they changed her name to Charlotte Catherine Lawrence Mills; married Raymond Burt in 1987.
- Lady Georgina FitzClarence (born 1966).

In 1979, Viscount FitzClarence, as he now was, married thirdly Dorothy Alexa Maxwell (d. 13 June 1995). They had no children.

On 3 May 1997, Lord Munster, as he had become in November 1983, married fourthly Halina Winska. They had no children.

With no male heirs, the titles became extinct on his death in December 2000.

== Notes ==
Peerage of the United Kingdom
Preceded by Edward FitzClarence	Earl of Munster; 1983–2000	Extinct
