= Countess of Munster Musical Trust =

The Countess of Munster Musical Trust is a charity based in Godalming, Surrey, England, that provides scholarships, prizes and loans to support young musicians in the United Kingdom.

== History ==
The trust was founded in 1958 by Hilary Wilson (9 March 1903 – 1979), a gifted pianist with a love of music. Her father was Kenneth Wilson, who inherited the prosperous Wilson Shipping Line, and she became Hilary FitzClarence, Countess of Munster, after her marriage to Geoffrey FitzClarence, 5th Earl of Munster (grandson of Wilhelmina FitzClarence, Countess of Munster) in 1928. Wilson performed in hospitals and schools, both before and after her marriage, and young musicians would gather at her home in Bletchingley, Surrey.

Wilson started the trust with a large endowment, which continued to grow until her death in 1979.

== Description ==
The trust, which is based in Godalming, Surrey, offers various awards, loans and sponsorships, including:

- Study awards, which are available for postgraduate studies for talented young instrumentalists, singers, conductors and composers, aged from 18 to 25 or 28 years old (it varies by category), and resident in the British Commonwealth.
- Instrument purchase loans
- Munster Trust Study Awards
- Recital scheme
- LSSO Munster Trust Scholars, whereby funding is provided to a number of gifted young musicians to attend various events and courses organised by the London Schools Symphony Orchestra

=== Stephen Oliver Award ===
Since 2006 the trust also administers the Stephen Oliver Award, to assist with the staging of a new piece of musical theatre by a young composer. The biennial award, worth £5,000 in 2021, was created after the capital funds of the estate of Stephen Oliver (1950–1992) had been incorporated into the Countess of Munster Musical Trust in 2006. It retains the primary aims of the Stephen Oliver Trust, which were "to encourage the creation, promotion and performance of contemporary opera, and to encourage young people working in contemporary opera".

The Stephen Oliver Trust had previously awarded two Stephen Oliver Prizes, in 1994 and 1996.

=== Neil Black Award ===
The Neil Black Award, named in honour of oboist Neil Black, was established based on a donation given to the trust after Black's death in 2016. Awarded annually to a young woodwind player, winners include oboists Manou Rolland (2018) and Hannah Condliffe (2019), and bassoonist Olivia Palmer-Baker (2020).
