= William FitzClarence, 2nd Earl of Munster =

British peer (1824–1901)

The Right Honourable The Earl of Munster
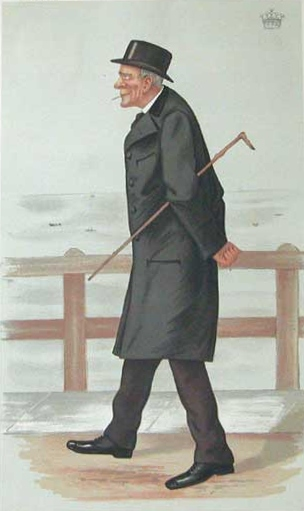
- The Earl of Munster as caricatured by Spy (Leslie Ward) in Vanity Fair, February 1882
- Born: 19 May 1824; Dun House, Montrose, Scotland
- Died: 30 April 1901 (aged 76)
- Noble family: FitzClarence
- Spouse: Wilhelmina Kennedy-Erskine (m. 1855)
- Issue: Edward, Viscount FitzClarence; Hon. Lionel Frederick Archibald; Geoffrey FitzClarence, 3rd Earl of Munster; Hon. Arthur Falkland Manners; Aubrey FitzClarence, 4th Earl of Munster; Hon. William George; Hon. Harold Edward; Lady Lillian Boyd; Lady Dorothea Lee-Warner
- Father: George FitzClarence, 1st Earl of Munster
- Mother: Mary Wyndham

William FitzClarence, 2nd Earl of Munster, (19 May 1824 – 30 April 1901), styled Viscount FitzClarence from 1831 to 1842, was a British peer. He was named after his grandfather, King William IV.

== Biography ==
Arms of FitzClarence, Earl of Munster: The royal arms of King William IV (without the escutcheon of the Arch Treasurer of the Holy Roman Empire and without the Crown of Hanover) debruised by a baton sinister azure charged with three anchors or

FitzClarence's father, George FitzClarence, 1st Earl of Munster, was an illegitimate son of King William IV by his long-time mistress Dorothea Jordan. Therefore, the second Earl of Munster was the great-grandson of King George III and first cousin once removed of Queen Victoria. His mother was Mary Wyndham (d. 3 December 1842), the illegitimate daughter of George Wyndham, 3rd Earl of Egremont.

FitzClarence succeeded as the 2nd Earl of Munster on the suicide of his father, on 20 March 1842. For the most part, FitzClarence led a typical Victorian upper-class life of hunting parties and balls.

He purchased a commission as ensign and lieutenant in the Scots Fusilier Guards on 1 July 1842. On 7 April 1843, he purchased a cornetcy and sub-lieutenancy in the Grenadier Guards. He purchased a lieutenancy on 1 May 1846 and a captaincy on 16 March 1849. Munster retired from the Army in April 1851.

== Marriage and children ==
FitzClarence married his first cousin Wilhelmina Kennedy-Erskine (27 June 1830 – 9 October 1906), eldest daughter of Hon. John Kennedy-Erskine and Lady Augusta FitzClarence on 17 April 1855. Her mother, Augusta FitzClarence, was the sister of his father, George Augustus FitzClarence. In later life, she became a novelist. They had nine children:

- Edward FitzClarence, Viscount FitzClarence (29 March 1856 – 1870)
- Hon Lionel Frederick Archibald FitzClarence (24 July 1857 – 24 March 1863)
- Major Geoffrey George Gordon FitzClarence, 3rd Earl of Munster (18 July 1859 – 2 February 1902); died without issue
- Hon Arthur Falkland Manners FitzClarence (18 October 1860 – 20 April 1861)
- Aubrey FitzClarence, 4th Earl of Munster (7 June 1862 – 1 January 1928); died without issue
- Hon William George FitzClarence (17 September 1864 – 4 October 1899), married Charlotte Elizabeth Williams
- Hon Harold Edward FitzClarence (15 November 1870 – 28 August 1926); father of Geoffrey FitzClarence, 5th Earl of Munster
- Lady Lillian Adelaide Katherine Mary FitzClarence (10 December 1873 – 15 July 1948), married Captain William Arthur Edward Boyd
- Lady Dorothea Augusta FitzClarence (5 May 1876 – 28 January 1942), married Major Chandos Brydges Lee-Warner

== Death ==
Lord Munster died in 1901, at 23 Palmeira Square, Hove, at the age of 77, when his second cousin Edward VII was on the throne of the United Kingdom. He was buried at Cuckfield, Sussex. He was succeeded in the earldom and other titles by his third eldest son, Geoffrey.

== Notes ==
Peerage of the United Kingdom
Preceded by George FitzClarence	Earl of Munster; 1842–1901	Succeeded by Geoffrey FitzClarence
