= Lord Augustus FitzClarence =

British royal bastard (1805–1854)

The Reverend Lord Augustus FitzClarence
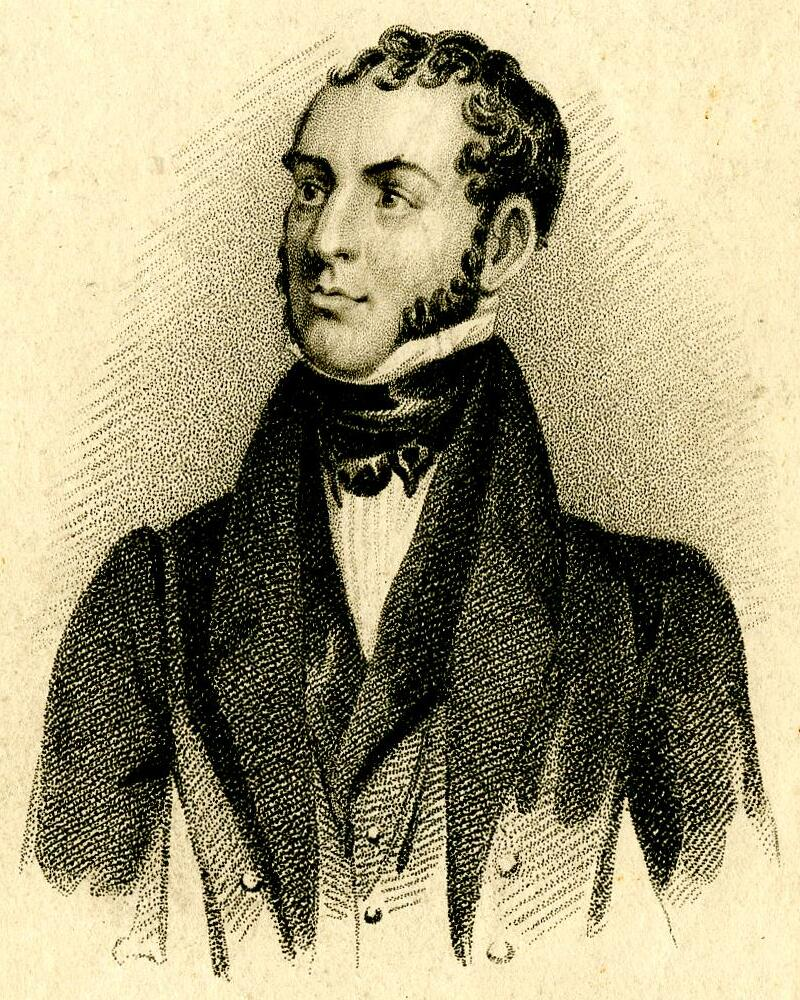
- Born: 1 March 1805
- Died: 14 June 1854 (aged 49)
- Buried: St Margaret's Church, Mapledurham, Oxfordshire
- Noble family: FitzClarence
- Spouse: Sarah Gordon (m. 1845)
- Issue: Dorothea FitzClarence; Eva FitzClarence; Beatrice FitzClarence; Augustus FitzClarence; Henry Edward FitzClarence; Mary FitzClarence
- Father: William IV
- Mother: Dorothea Jordan
- Occupation: Chaplain

Lord Augustus FitzClarence (1 March 1805 – 14 June 1854), was the youngest illegitimate son of William IV of the United Kingdom and his long-time mistress Dorothea Jordan. Like his siblings, he had little contact with his mother after his parents separated in 1811.

== Career ==
In 1829 Augustus was appointed a Chaplain of his father (then Duke of Clarence and St Andrews) and later that year he was presented with the vicarage of Mapledurham in Oxfordshire, succeeding John Sumner (later Bishop of Chester and Archbishop of Canterbury). King William IV was a lavish benefactor of the church and the parish and, among his gifts was the clock in the tower which bears his initials, ″W R.″; he also made generous contributions to extend the vicarage and to enclose its adjacent grounds with substantial provisions for the foundation of a new school in the village. The marvellous collection of silver gilt communion plate presented to the church by Lord Augustus shortly after his appointment was probably in turn a gift from his father.

In 1830 he was appointed Chaplain in ordinary to his father (now King William IV), and on 24 May 1831 was granted the rank of a marquess' younger son, being appointed Chaplain to Queen Adelaide after his father's accession to the throne in 1832. Following his studies at Trinity College, Cambridge, he received the degrees of LL.B. (2 June 1832) and LL.D. (6 July 1835).

== Marriage and issue ==
On 2 January 1845 he married Sarah Elizabeth Catharine Gordon, a daughter of Maj. Lord Henry Gordon (a younger brother of Charles Gordon, 10th Marquess of Huntly and a relative of the husband of his sister Lady Augusta Gordon) by his wife Louisa Payne. By his wife he had six children:

- Dorothea FitzClarence (1845–1870), who married Thomas William Goff, MP for County Roscommon, and had issue, including Clarence Goff.
- Eva FitzClarence (1847–1918).
- Beatrice FitzClarence (1847–1909), a twin with Eva.
- Augustus FitzClarence (1849–1861), who died young.
- Henry Edward FitzClarence (1853–1930), who married Mary Isabel Templer Parsons and had issue.
- Mary FitzClarence (1854–1858), who was born after Lord Augustus' death and who died in infancy.

== Death ==
FitzClarence died on 14 June 1854. He was buried at St Margaret's Church, Mapledurham. His widow lived until 23 March 1901.

== Ancestry ==
Ancestors of Lord Augustus FitzClarence

16. George II of Great Britain
8. Frederick, Prince of Wales
17. Caroline of Brandenburg-Ansbach
4. George III of the United Kingdom
18. Frederick II, Duke of Saxe-Gotha-Altenburg
9. Princess Augusta of Saxe-Gotha
19. Magdalena Augusta of Anhalt-Zerbst
2. William IV of the United Kingdom
20. Adolf Frederick II, Duke of Mecklenburg-Strelitz
10. Duke Charles Louis Frederick of Mecklenburg
21. Princess Christiane Emilie of Schwarzburg-Sondershausen
5. Charlotte of Mecklenburg-Strelitz
22. Ernest Frederick I, Duke of Saxe-Hildburghausen
11. Princess Elisabeth Albertine of Saxe-Hildburghausen
23. Countess Sophia Albertine of Erbach-Erbach
1. Lord Augustus FitzClarence
24. James Bland
12. Nathaniel Bland
25. Lucy Brewster
6. Francis Bland
26. Francis Heaton
13. Elizabeth Heaton
27. Elizabeth Curtis
3. Dorothy Jordan
7. Grace Phillips
