= Violet Jacob =

Scottish writer (1863–1946)

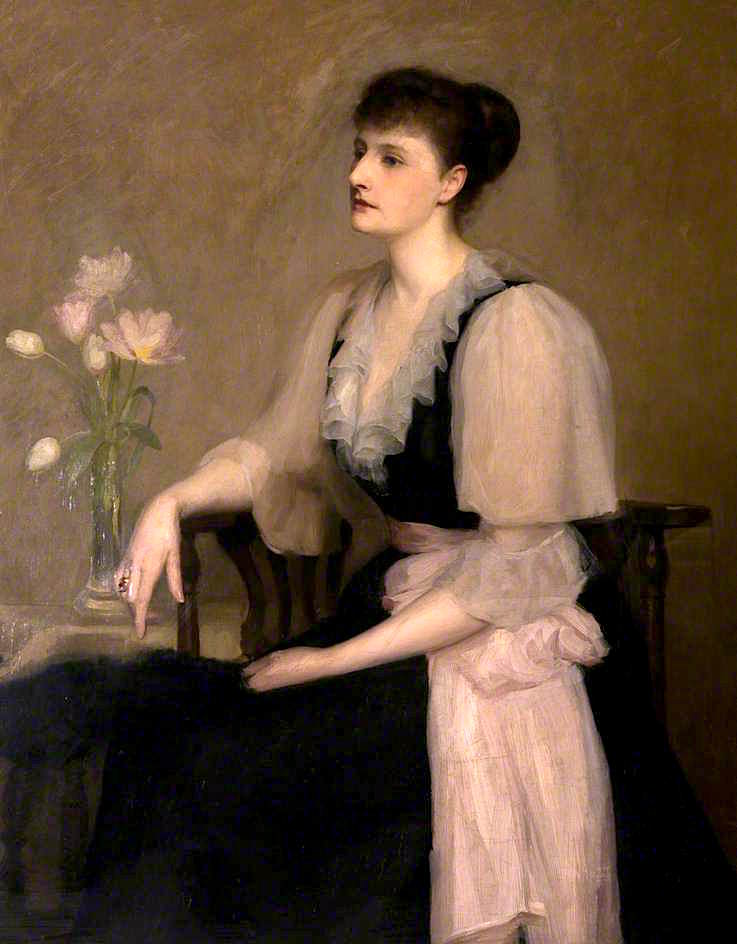
- Violet Jacob, by Henry Harris Brown
- Born: Violet Augusta Mary Frederica Kennedy-Erskine; 1 September 1863; House of Dun, near Montrose in Angus
- Died: 9 September 1946 (aged 83); Marywell House, near Kirriemuir
- Resting place: Dun kirkyard
- Known for: Poetry in Scots
- Spouse: Arthur Otway Jacob (m. 1894–1936)
- Children: 1 Arthur Henry Augustus Jacob Royal Fusiliers d. 16/7 1916

Violet Jacob (1 September 1863 – 9 September 1946) was a Scottish writer known especially for her historical novel Flemington and for her poetry, mainly in Scots. She was described by a fellow Scottish poet Hugh MacDiarmid as "the most considerable of contemporary vernacular poets".

== Early life ==
Jacob was born Violet Augusta Mary Frederica Kennedy-Erskine, at the House of Dun, the daughter of William Henry Kennedy-Erskine (1 July 1828 – 15 September 1870) of Dun, Forfarshire, a captain in the 17th Lancers and Catherine Jones (died 13 February 1914), the only daughter of William Jones of Henllys, Carmarthenshire. Her father was the son of John Kennedy-Erskine (1802–1831) of Dun and Augusta FitzClarence (1803–1865), the illegitimate daughter of King William IV and Dorothy Jordan. She was a great-granddaughter of Archibald Kennedy, 1st Marquess of Ailsa.

The area of Montrose where her family seat of Dun was situated was the setting for much of her fiction. She married, at St John's Episcopal Church, Princes Street, Edinburgh, on 27 October 1894, Arthur Otway Jacob (1867–1936), an Irish major in the British Army, and accompanied him to India where he was serving. Her book Diaries and letters from India 1895–1900 is about their stay in the Central Indian town of Mhow. The couple had one son, Harry, born in 1895, who died as a soldier at the Battle of the Somme in 1916. Arthur died in 1936, and Violet returned to live at Kirriemuir, in Angus. She died of heart disease on 9 September 1946 and was buried beside her husband at the graveyard at Dun.

== Scots poetry ==
Violet Jacob was described by Hugh MacDiarmid as "by far the most considerable of contemporary vernacular poets", a view he did not rescind over a fifty-year period. She was particularly known for her poems in the Angus dialect. Her poetry was associated with that of Scots revivalists like Marion Angus, Alexander Gray and Lewis Spence, who drew their inspiration from early Scots poets such as Robert Henryson and William Dunbar, rather than from Robert Burns.

Jacob is commemorated in Makars' Court, outside the Writers' Museum, Lawnmarket, Edinburgh. Selections for Makars' Court are made by the Writers' Museum, The Saltire Society and The Scottish Poetry Library. In 1936 she was awarded an honorary LLD degree by Edinburgh University.

Oh, tell me what was on yer road, ye roarin' norlan wind
As ye cam' blawin' frae the land that's niver frae my mind?
My feet they trayvel England, but I'm deein' for the north –
My man, I heard the siller tides rin up the Firth o' Forth.

— from "The Wild Geese", Songs of Angus (1915)

The Wild Geese, a conversation between the author and the North Wind, is a melancholic poem on the theme of homesickness. It was set to music as Norlan' Wind and popularised by Angus singer and songmaker Jim Reid, who also set to music other poems by Jacob and those other Angus poets such as Marion Angus and Helen Cruikshank. Another version, sung by Cilla Fisher and Artie Trezise, appeared on their 1979 Topic Records album Cilla and Artie. Traditional folk band Malinky are among many other artists who have released versions of Norland Wind.

== Prose ==
Apart from her collections of poetry and short stories, Violet Jacob published an Erskine family history (Lairds of Dun, 1931) and five novels, the best known of which is the tragic Flemington (1911; reissued in 1994), set in the aftermath of the Jacobite rising of 1745. Flemington was described by John Buchan as "the best Scots romance since The Master of Ballantrae".

== Works ==
- The Sheep-stealers (1902), novel
- The Infant Moralist (1903), poems
- The Interloper (1904), novel
- The Golden Heart & other fairy stories (1904), stories
- Verses (1905)
- Irresolute Catherine (1908), novella
- The History of Aythan Waring (1908), novel
- Stories Told by the Miller (1909)
- The Fortune-hunters and Other Stories (1910)
- Flemington (1911), novel
- Songs of Angus (1915), poems
- More songs of Angus and others (1918), poems
- Bonnie Joann and other poems (1921)
- Tales of my own country (1922), short stories
- Two new poems (1924), poems
- The Northern Lights and other poems (1927), poems
- The good child's year book (1928)
- The Lairds of Dun (1931), family history
- The Scottish poems of Violet Jacob (1944), poems
- The Lum hat and other stories: Last tales of Violet Jacob (1982), short stories
- Diaries and letters from India 1895–1900 (1990)

== Reviews ==
Isobel Murray (1983), "The Forgotten Violet Jacob", reviewing The Lum Hat and Other Stories", in Sheila G. Hearn, ed., Cencrastus No. 13, Summer 1983, p. 54
