= House of Dun =

Historic building in Scotland

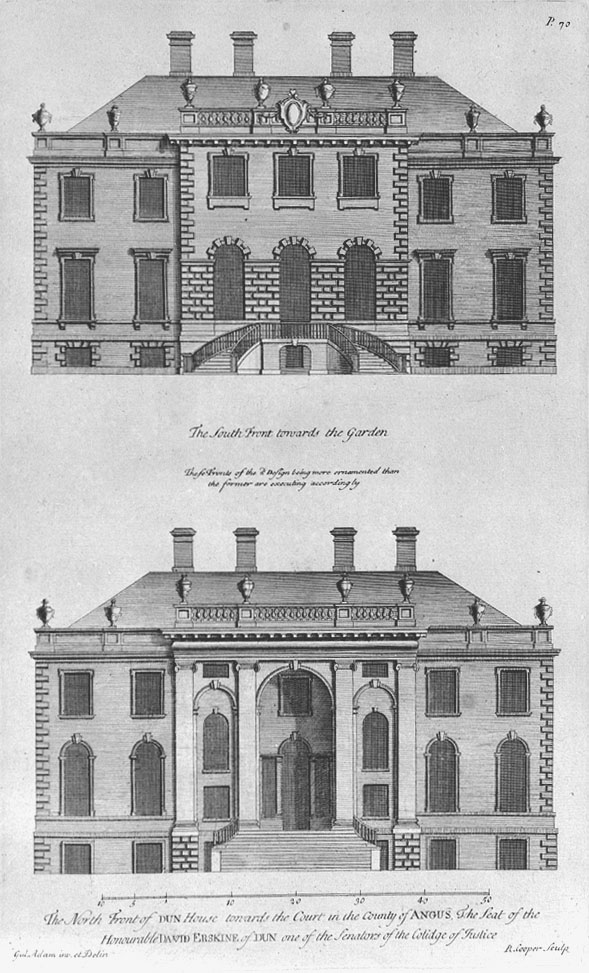
- The south front (top) and north front of the House of Dun, as illustrated in William Adam's Vitruvius Scoticus.

- Location within Scotland

General information
- Location: Angus, Scotland
- Coordinates: 56°43′45″N 2°32′25″W

Design and construction
- Architect: William Adam

Website
- https://www.nts.org.uk/visit/places/house-of-dun

Inventory of Gardens and Designed Landscapes in Scotland
- Official name: House of Dun
- Designated: 30 June 1987
- Reference no.: GDL00213

The House of Dun is a National Trust for Scotland property in the parish of Dun, lying close to the edge of Montrose Basin and situated approximately halfway between the towns of Montrose and Brechin, in Angus, Scotland.

== History ==
The Dun Estate was home to the Erskine (Kennedy-Erskine from 1824) family from 1375 until 1980. John Erskine of Dun was a key figure in the Scottish Reformation. The current house was designed by William Adam and was finished in 1743. (Work had commenced in 1732.) There is elaborate plaster-work by Joseph Enzer, principally and most elaborately in the saloon. The house replaced the original 14th-century tower house to the west when David Erskine, Lord Dun, the 13th Laird of Dun, an Edinburgh lawyer appointed Lord of Justiciary in 1710, wanted a more comfortable and prestigious home. He opposed the union.

It continued as the home to the Erskines for a further 250 years, undergoing some internal re-modeling when Lady Augusta Fitzclarence, natural daughter to William IV (previously the Duke of Clarence) and his long term mistress, Dora Jordan, married the Honourable John Kennedy Erskine, heir to the property through his mother Margaret Erskine of Dun. When they married they moved to the property and Augusta set about making several alterations, modernizing the property. The writer and poet Violet Jacob (1863–1946), author of Flemington and Tales of Angus, was a member of the Kennedy-Erskine family and was born in the house.

The last Laird of Dun was Millicent Lovett. She moved out of the house to an estate house "temporarily" in 1948, moving all the furnishings and artifacts up into the attic. The rest of the house was leased to a local farming family who ran it as a bed and breakfast establishment for many years. Millicent never returned to the house and on her death in 1980 it was bequeathed by her to the National Trust for Scotland. The Trust discovered all the original furnishings in the attic and spent nine years returning the house to the state it had been in at the time of Augusta. In 1989, the house opened to the public, the Queen Mother presiding to mark the tercentenary of William Adam's death.

The adjacent Montrose Basin nature reserve, part of the estuary of the South Esk, is also a National Trust for Scotland property.

== Archaeology ==
The proximate area evinces archaeological evidence of early man dating back 9,000 years. Besides finds at the House of Dun property itself, there is a large standing stone a few miles to the north known as the Stone of Morphie.

== Notable people ==
- John Erskine of Dun (1509–1591), Laird of Dun, Scottish religious reformer
- David Erskine, Lord Dun (1670–1758), 13th Laird of Dun, Scottish advocate, judge and commissioner to the Scottish parliament, who commissioned William Adam to build House of Dun
- Margaret Erskine of Dun (1772–1848), wife of Archibald Kennedy, 1st Marquess of Ailsa
- Hon. John Kennedy-Erskine (1802–1831), second son of the 1st Marquess of Ailsa and Margaret Erskine; adopted the additional surname of Erskine upon inheriting the Dun estate
- Lady Augusta Gordon (née FitzClarence; 1803–1865), fourth illegitimate daughter of William IV, wife of Hon. John Kennedy-Erskine and mother of Wilhelmina FitzClarence, Countess of Munster
- Wilhelmina FitzClarence, Countess of Munster (née Kennedy-Erskine; 1830–1906), novelist
- Violet Jacob (1863–1946), Scottish writera and poet, known especially for her historical novel Flemington

== See also ==
- Clan Erskine
- Dun, Angus
