= Geoffrey FitzClarence, 3rd Earl of Munster =

British army officer and peer (1859–1902)

The Right Honourable The Earl of Munster DSO
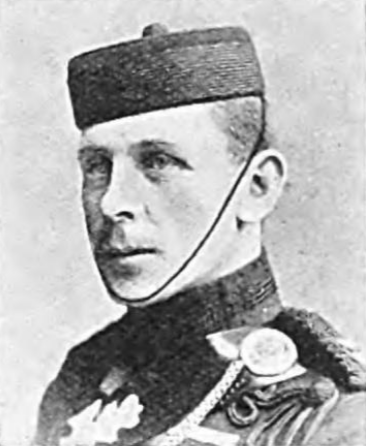
- Born: Geoffrey George Gordon FitzClarence; 18 July 1859
- Died: 2 February 1902 (aged 42); Orange Free State
- Father: William FitzClarence, 2nd Earl of Munster
- Mother: Wilhelmina Kennedy-Erskine

Geoffrey George Gordon FitzClarence, 3rd Earl of Munster, DSO (18 July 1859 – 2 February 1902), known as Lord Tewkesbury 1870–1901, was a British peer, and the great-grandson of King William IV by his mistress Dorothea Jordan.

== Family ==
Born Geoffrey George Gordon FitzClarence, he was the son of William FitzClarence, 2nd Earl of Munster (19 May 1824 – 30 April 1901) and Wilhelmina Kennedy-Erskine (27 June 1830 – 9 October 1906). His parents were first cousins, thus making Geoffrey a great-grandson of William IV twice over. His grandfather on his paternal side was George Augustus FitzClarence and his grandmother on his maternal side was Lady Augusta FitzClarence, who were brother and sister.

Geoffrey was the third son of nine children. His elder brothers, Edward and Lionel, both died before reaching their majority. Edward died at the age of 14, Lionel as a young child.

== Military career ==
Lord Tewkesbury was commissioned into the British Army as a subaltern of the 2nd Battalion King's Royal Rifle Corps (then the 60th Rifles). He served in the Second Anglo-Afghan War in 1879–1880 at the age of 19, was present at the engagement at Ahmed Kheyl, and Uraco, near Ghaznee, and accompanied Lord Roberts in the march to Kandahar, and was present at the battle of that name. He also saw some service with the third battalion of his regiment in the First Boer War in 1881. He became captain in 1888 and resigned his commission in the Regular Forces in 1895.

After his retirement he joined the part-time 3rd (Militia) Battalion, Royal Scots (Lothian Regiment) as a captain on 25 March 1896, and after some years' service in command of a company was promoted to the honorary rank of major. The battalion was embodied in December 1899 to serve in the Second Boer War, and in early March 1900 left Queenstown on the SS Oriental for South Africa. Lord Tewkesbury was mentioned in dispatches and received the Distinguished Service Order (DSO) for his service.

== Peerage ==
It was during his last military engagement in South Africa that Lord Tewkesbury received notice of his father's death and his own succession to the Munster earldom and other titles. He never returned to the United Kingdom, dying in South Africa at the age of 42 from an accident at Lace Mines, just nine months after becoming 3rd Earl of Munster.

The 3rd Earl was unmarried and had no children. The earldom and other titles therefore passed to his next brother Aubrey.

== Titles ==
- Hon Geoffrey FitzClarence (1859-1870)
- Lord Tewkesbury (1870-1901)
- The Rt Hon the 3rd Earl of Munster (1901-1902)

Peerage of the United Kingdom
Preceded by William FitzClarence	Earl of Munster; 1901–1902	Succeeded by Aubrey FitzClarence
