= Neil Black =

English oboist

Neil Cathcart Black OBE (28 May 1932 – 14 August 2016) was an English oboist. He held the post of principal oboe in four London orchestras, and taught at the Royal Academy of Music and the Guildhall School of Music and Drama.

== Early life and education ==
Black was born in Birmingham on 28 May 1932. He starting playing the oboe at the age of 11, and played in the National Youth Orchestra between 1948 and 1951.

He attended Exeter College, Oxford between 1952 and 1956, and took a degree in history. In 1956–57 Black studied the oboe with Terence MacDonagh.

== Career ==
From 1958 to 1960 he was principal oboist of the London Philharmonic Orchestra. Later in his career, he was the principal oboist of the Academy of St Martin in the Fields, the English Chamber Orchestra and the London Mozart Players. He is described by The Oxford Dictionary of Music as a "frequent soloist with chamber orchestras" and a "specialist in Baroque and pre‐classical repertoire".

From 1960 to 1970 Black was a professor at the Royal Academy of Music, London. He later taught at the Guildhall School of Music and Drama.

== Recognition ==
Black was appointed OBE in 1989.

== Later life, death and legacy ==
In his later years he musical director of the Kirckman Concert Society, which was formed in 1963 to promote young artists of exceptional talent. He also became advisor to the Tunnell Trust, encouraging young musicians in this role as well.

He died at Sutton Coldfield on 14 August 2016.

The Neil Black Award was created in honour of Black, based on a donation given to the Countess of Munster Musical Trust after his death in 2016. It is awarded annually to a young woodwind player.

== Discography ==
- For a Girls' Night In'. Decca/Universal Classics (476 104). (Features Black in Vivaldi's Oboe Concerto in F)
- Mozart and Beethoven: Quintets for Piano and Winds. Sony Classics/SME (SK 42099)
- Mozart: Clarinet Quintet, Horn Quintet, Oboe Quartet. (ASIN B00000411T) (Features Black in Mozart's Oboe Quartet in F)
- Mozart, Strauss, Weber: Wind Concertos. Sony Clasics/SME (ASIN B0000029S9) (Features Black in Richard Strauss's Oboe Concerto in D major)
- Vaughan Williams: Concerto For Oboe; Concerto For Tuba; The Lark Ascending. Deutsche Grammophon/Universal Clasics (B0017IAUOK)
