= Edward FitzClarence, 6th Earl of Munster =

British peer (1899–1983)

The Right Honourable The Earl of Munster

Member of the House of Lords
- Lord Temporal
- Hereditary peerage 26 August 1975 – 15 November 1983
- Preceded by: Geoffrey FitzClarence, 5th Earl of Munster
- Succeeded by: Anthony FitzClarence, 7th Earl of Munster

Personal details
- Born: Edward Charles FitzClarence; 3 October 1899 Kensington, London, England
- Died: 15 November 1983 (aged 84) Surrey, England
- Spouse(s): Monica Grayson; Vivian Scholfield
- Children: Anthony FitzClarence, 7th Earl of Munster; Lady Jill Mary FitzClarence
- Parents: Charles FitzClarence (father); Violet Spencer-Churchill (mother)

Edward Charles FitzClarence, 6th Earl of Munster (3 October 1899 – 1983) was a British peer. He became Earl of Munster in 1975 on the death of his cousin.

== Life ==
He was the son of Brigadier-General Charles FitzClarence from his marriage to Violet Spencer-Churchill. He attended Eton College and the Royal Military College and then served as a captain in the Irish Guards. On 26 August 1975 he succeeded his childless second cousin, Geoffrey FitzClarence, 5th Earl of Munster, as 6th Earl of Munster and sat in the House of Lords.

== Marriages and offspring ==
On 30 July 1925, he married Monica Grayson, daughter of Lieutenant-Colonel Sir Henry Grayson, 1st Baronet. They divorced in 1930. They had two children:

- Anthony FitzClarence, 7th Earl of Munster (1926–2000)
- Lady Jill Mary FitzClarence (b. 1928)

On 28 September 1939, he married his second wife, Vivian Scholfield. They had no children.

Peerage of the United Kingdom
Preceded by Geoffrey FitzClarence	Earl of Munster; 1975–1983	Succeeded by Anthony FitzClarence
