= Earl of Munster =

Extinct earldom in the Peerage of the United Kingdom

Earldom of Munster
- Arms of FitzClarence, Earl of Munster: The royal arms of King William IV (without the escutcheon of the Arch Treasurer of the Holy Roman Empire and without the Crown of Hanover) debruised by a baton sinister azure charged with three anchors or
- Creation date: 4 June 1831
- Created by: King William IV
- Peerage: Peerage of the United Kingdom
- First holder: George FitzClarence, 1st Earl of Munster
- Last holder: Anthony FitzClarence, 7th Earl of Munster
- Remainder to: the 1st Earl's heirs male whatsoever
- Subsidiary titles: Viscount Fitzclarence, Baron Tewkesbury
- Status: Extinct
- Extinction date: 30 December 2000
- Motto: Nec Temere Nec Timide (Neither rashly nor fearfully)

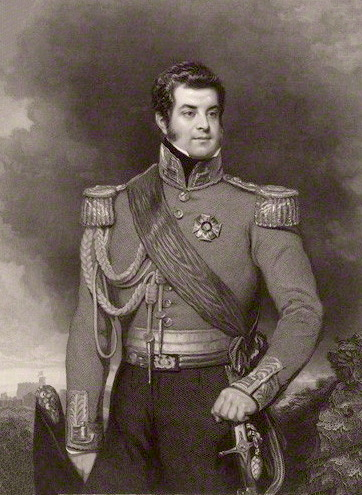
George FitzClarence, 1st Earl of Munster.

Earl of Munster was a title that was created twice, once in the Peerage of Ireland and once in the Peerage of the United Kingdom. The first creation came in 1789 in favour of Prince William, the third son of King George III. He was made Duke of Clarence and St Andrews at the same time. When William succeeded to the throne as King William IV in 1830 the titles merged with the crown.

The second creation came in the Peerage of the United Kingdom on 12 May 1831 for George Augustus Frederick FitzClarence, the eldest illegitimate son of William IV. He was made Viscount FitzClarence and Baron Tewkesbury at the same time. The viscountcy was used as a courtesy title by the heir apparent to the earldom. The titles were created with remainder to the heirs male of his body lawfully begotten.

Lord Munster's great-grandson, the fifth earl (who succeeded his uncle), was a prominent Conservative politician and held ministerial office under five prime ministers. He was succeeded by his second cousin, the sixth earl. He was the son of Brigadier General Charles FitzClarence, VC (8 May 1865 – 12 November 1914), son of Captain the Hon. George FitzClarence, third son of the first earl. On the death of his son, the seventh earl, in 2000, the titles became extinct.

== Earls of Munster; first creation (1789) ==
- see Duke of Clarence and St Andrews

== Earls of Munster; second creation (1831) ==
- George Augustus Frederick FitzClarence, 1st Earl of Munster (1794–1842)
- William George FitzClarence, 2nd Earl of Munster (1824–1901)
  - Edward Fitz-Clarence, Viscount FitzClarence (1856–1870)
- Geoffrey George Gordon FitzClarence, 3rd Earl of Munster (1859–1902)
- Aubrey FitzClarence, 4th Earl of Munster (1862–1928)
- Geoffrey William Richard Hugh FitzClarence, 5th Earl of Munster (1906–1975)
- Edward Charles FitzClarence, 6th Earl of Munster (1899–1983)
- Anthony Charles FitzClarence, 7th Earl of Munster (1926–2000)

=== Male line family tree ===
Family of Earl of Munster

George FitzClarence; 1st Earl; 1794–1842
William FitzClarence; 2nd Earl; 1824–1901	Hon. Frederick FitzClarence; 1826–1878	Hon. Capt. George FitzClarence; 1836–1894	Hon. Lt. Edward FitzClarence; 1837–1855
Edward; Viscount FitzClarence; 1856–1870	Hon. Lionel FitzClarence; 1857–1863	Geoffrey FitzClarence; 3rd Earl; 1859–1902	Hon. Arthur FitzClarence; 1860–1861	Aubrey FitzClarence; 4th Earl; 1862–1928	Hon. William FitzClarence; 1864–1899	Hon. Harold FitzClarence; 1870–1926	Capt. Edward FitzClarence; 1865–1897	Brig.gen. Charles FitzClarence; 1865–1914	Capt. William FitzClarence; 1868–1921	Lionel FitzClarence; 1870–1936
Geoffrey FitzClarence; 5th Earl; 1906–1975	Edward FitzClarence; 6th Earl; 1899–1983
Anthony FitzClarence; 7th Earl; 1926–2000

== Arms ==
Coat of arms of the Earl of Munster
Crest On a Chapeau Gules turned up Ermine a Lion statant guardant crowned with a Ducal Coronet Or and gorged with a Collar Azure charged with three Anchors Gold. Escutcheon The Royal Arms of King William IV (without the Escutcheon of the Arch Treasurer of the Holy Roman Empire, and without the Crown of Hanover) debruised by a Baton Sinister Azure charged with three Anchors Or. Supporters On the dexter side a Lion guardant ducally crowned Or, and on the sinister side a Horse Argent, each gorged with a Collar Azure charged with three Anchors Gold. Motto Nec Temere Nec Timide (Neither rashly nor fearfully)

== See also ==
- Duchess of Munster
