= Baron Tewkesbury =

The title Baron Tewkesbury has been created twice, once in the Peerage of Great Britain, and once in the Peerage of the United Kingdom.

- in 1706 as a subsidiary title of the Duke of Cambridge
- in 1831 as a subsidiary title of the Earl of Munster
