= Lady Augusta Gordon =

British noblewoman

- Hon. Mrs. John Kennedy-Erskine; Lady Frederick Gordon-Hallyburton
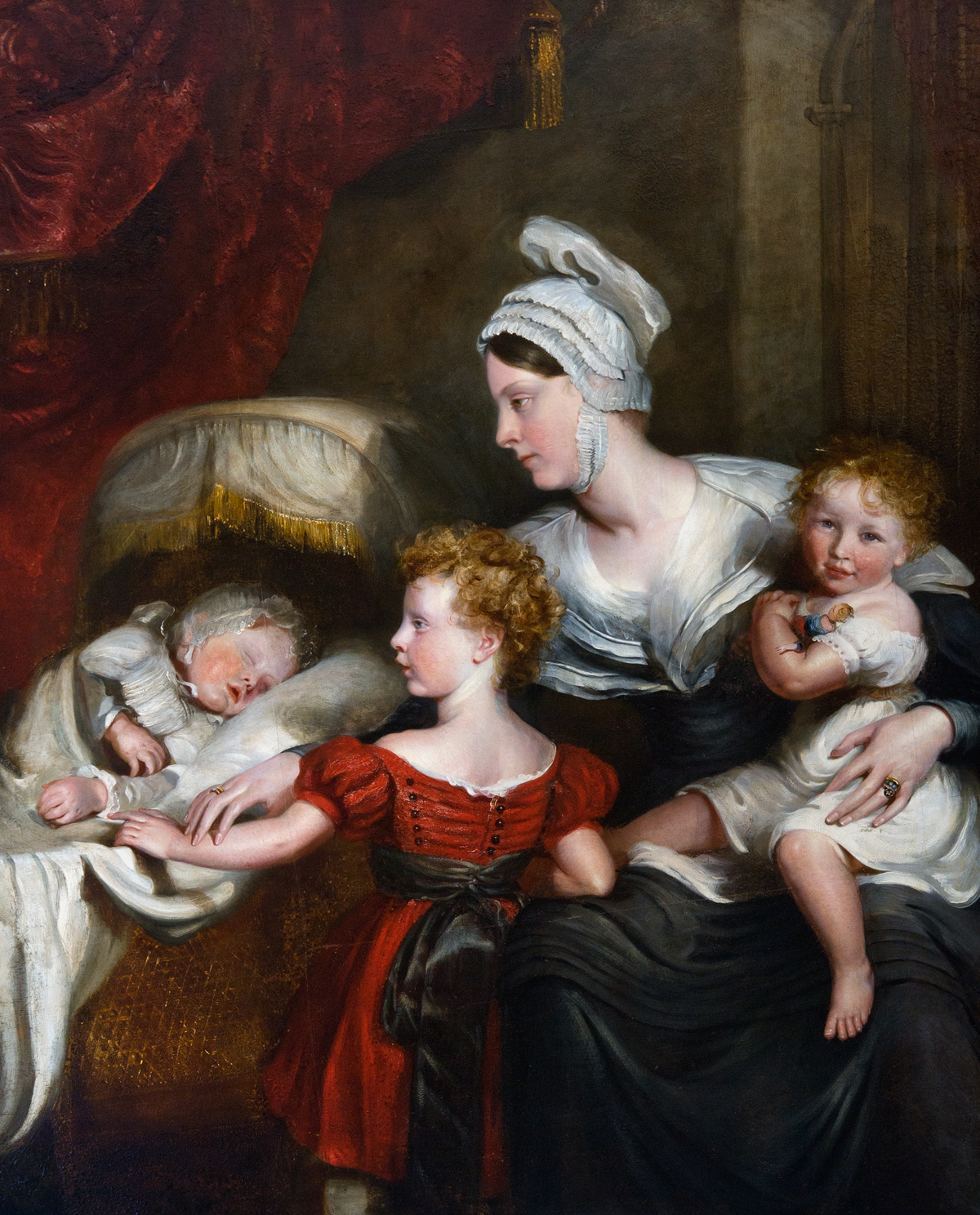
- Lady Augusta with her three children
- Born: 17 November 1803; Bushy House, Teddington
- Died: 8 December 1865 (aged 62)
- Noble family: FitzClarence
- Spouses: Hon. John Kennedy-Erskine (m. 1827; died 1831) Lord Frederick Gordon-Hallyburton (m. 1836)
- Issue: William Henry Kennedy-Erskine; Wilhelmina FitzClarence, Countess of Munster; Millicent Wemyss
- Father: William IV
- Mother: Dorothea Jordan

Lady Augusta Gordon (née FitzClarence; 17 November 1803 – 8 December 1865) was a British noblewoman. Born the fourth illegitimate daughter of William IV of the United Kingdom (then Duke of Clarence and St Andrews) and Dorothea Jordan, she grew up at their Bushy House residence in Teddington. Augusta had four sisters and five brothers all surnamed FitzClarence. Soon after their father became monarch, the FitzClarence children were raised to the ranks of younger children of a marquess.

In 1827, Augusta married the Hon. John Kennedy-Erskine, son of the 13th Earl of Cassilis. They had three children before he died in 1831. Five years later, she married Lord Frederick Gordon, the third son of the 9th Marquess of Huntly. After the death of her sister Sophia in 1837, Augusta was appointed State Housekeeper of Kensington Palace by her father. She was the mother of the novelist Wilhelmina FitzClarence, Countess of Munster.

== Family and early life ==
Augusta FitzClarence was born at Bushy House, Teddington on 17 November 1803 as the fourth daughter of Prince William, Duke of Clarence and St Andrews by his long-time mistress, the famous comic actress Dorothea Jordan. Dorothea was the most successful actress of her day and continued to act on the stage during their relationship. Augusta had nine siblings from the relationship, four sisters and five brothers all surnamed FitzClarence. While circumstances prevented the couple from ever marrying, for twenty years William and Dorothea enjoyed domestic stability and were devoted to their children. In 1797, they moved from Clarence Lodge to Bushy House, residing at the Teddington residence until 1807. Augusta was born there.

Augusta's daughter Wilhelmina would later write that Bushy was "a happy and beloved home" until it "came to end" upon Prince William's marriage to Princess Adelaide of Saxe-Meiningen in 1818. He and Dorothea had parted ways in December 1811 under a deed of separation, the debt-ridden duke desiring to secure a rich wife. Dorothea was granted £4,400 and the task of caring for their daughters; William was permitted to visit them until they turned thirteen. She left Bushy in January 1812. The money was not enough to cover her debts, however. Dorothea continued to act on the stage after his leaving. In 1815, she moved from London to Boulogne, France to evade her creditors. On 5 July 1816, she died there alone. She had suffered from ill health and possessed little money, having squandered the bulk of it on her eldest daughter Frances (fathered by another man).

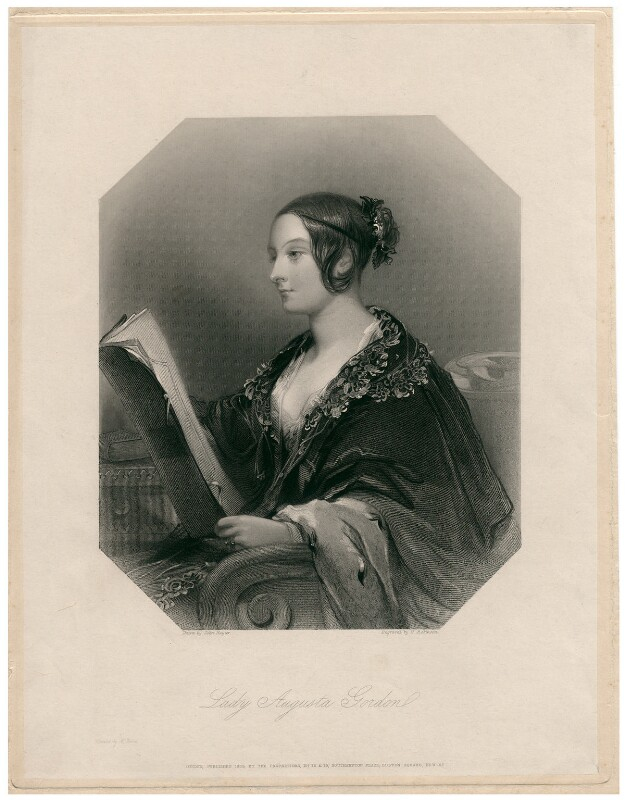
Lady Augusta Fitzclarence

Augusta's stepmother, Adelaide, was gentle and loving to the FitzClarence children. In 1818, Augusta and her siblings were granted a pension of £500, and Augusta was given her own version of the Royal Arms featuring a "baton sinister azure charged with an anchor between two roses or". In 1819, Baron Franz Ludwig von Bibra, a German man with knowledge of the classics and English, was engaged to tutor the two youngest FitzClarence daughters. He left in 1822 upon the completion of their education. In June 1830, the Duke of Clarence succeeded his brother George IV as King William IV. The following year, he made his eldest son George Earl of Munster, and had his issue by Jordan raised to the ranks of younger children of a marquess. With their father now monarch, the FitzClarences frequently attended court but their presence angered the Duchess of Kent, who felt that the FitzClarences would be a corrupting influence on her daughter Princess Victoria. King William loved his children and was aggrieved at their treatment at the hands of the Duchess, who would leave the room whenever they entered.

== Marriage to Kennedy-Erskine ==
On 5 July 1827, Augusta married the Hon. John Kennedy-Erskine, a younger son of the 13th Earl of Cassilis. Kennedy-Erskine served as a captain with the 16th Lancers, and was made an equerry to King William in 1830. They had three children:

- William Henry Kennedy-Erskine (1 July 1828 – 5 September 1870); married Catherine Jones in 1862 and had issue including the Scottish writer Violet Jacob
- Wilhelmina "Mina" Kennedy-Erskine (27 June 1830 – 9 October 1906); married William FitzClarence, 2nd Earl of Munster in 1855 and had issue
- Augusta Anne Millicent Kennedy-Erskine (11 May 1831 – 11 February 1895); married James Hay Erskine Wemyss in 1855 and had issue, including Randolph Wemyss and Rosslyn Wemyss, 1st Baron Wester Wemyss. They were also grandparents of William Grosvenor, 3rd Duke of Westminster.

Augusta enjoyed botany and needlework. John inherited his maternal grandfather's estate of Dun in Forfarshire, and as its châtelaine, Augusta was featured in Hugh Massingberd's Great Houses of Scotland. John died on 6 March 1831. Her youngest daughter Millicent was born posthumously, as John died several months before her birth. In an act considered scandalous, King William, still early in his reign, publicly mourned the death of his son-in-law.

Now widowed, Lady Augusta and her children lived in a "charming brickhouse" at Railshead on the River Thames. King William often visited his daughter and grandchildren there, at one point coming to comfort Augusta when her young daughter Wilhelmina fell ill with a fever. They would often visit the king at Windsor Castle as well. They also had a house in Brighton.

== Marriage to Gordon ==
On 24 August 1836, Lady Augusta married Lord Frederick Gordon, the third son of George Gordon, 9th Marquess of Huntly. Gordon was a professional sailor, and would become Admiral of the Navy in 1868. He and Augusta had no surviving children together.

Their Railshead residence had been situated next to a house owned by John's parents, who were angered by Augusta's second marriage and forced Augusta and Frederick to leave. Augusta turned to her father for help, and he granted her apartments in Kensington Palace and the position of State Housekeeper (replacing her recently deceased sister Sophia). They lived there for many years. In 1847, they embarked on a three-year trip to the continent, visiting Germany, France, and Italy. In 1850, they returned to Kensington Palace and Augusta's daughters came out in society. Both daughters married in 1855 in a double wedding, Wilhelmina to the 2nd Earl of Munster and Millicent to James Hay Erskine Wemyss.

Augusta died in 1865. Her husband survived Augusta by twelve years.

== Ancestry ==
Ancestors of Lady Augusta Gordon

16. George II of Great Britain
8. Frederick, Prince of Wales
17. Caroline of Brandenburg-Ansbach
4. George III of the United Kingdom
18. Frederick II, Duke of Saxe-Gotha-Altenburg
9. Princess Augusta of Saxe-Gotha
19. Magdalena Augusta of Anhalt-Zerbst
2. William IV of the United Kingdom
20. Adolf Frederick II, Duke of Mecklenburg-Strelitz
10. Duke Charles Louis Frederick of Mecklenburg
21. Princess Christiane Emilie of Schwarzburg-Sondershausen
5. Charlotte of Mecklenburg-Strelitz
22. Ernest Frederick I, Duke of Saxe-Hildburghausen
11. Princess Elisabeth Albertine of Saxe-Hildburghausen
23. Countess Sophia Albertine of Erbach-Erbach
1. Lady Augusta Gordon
24. James Bland
12. Nathaniel Bland
25. Lucy Brewster
6. Francis Bland
26. Francis Heaton
13. Elizabeth Heaton
27. Elizabeth Curtis
3. Dorothy Jordan
7. Grace Phillips
