= Geoffrey FitzClarence, 5th Earl of Munster =

British peer and politician

The Right Honourable The Earl of Munster KBE PC

Lord Lieutenant of Surrey
- In office 1957–1973
- Preceded by: Sir Robert Haining
- Succeeded by: The Lord Hamilton of Dalzell
Ministerial offices 1938-57
Minister without Portfolio
In office 1954–1957
Prime Minister	Anthony Eden; Winston Churchill
Preceded by	Arthur Greenwood
Succeeded by	The Lord Bancroft
Under-Secretary of State for the Colonies
In office 1951–1954
Prime Minister	Winston Churchill
Preceded by	Thomas Fotheringham-Cook
Succeeded by	The Lord Lloyd
Under-Secretary of State for the Home Department
In office 1944–1945
Prime Minister	Winston Churchill
Preceded by	Osbert Peake
Succeeded by	George Oliver
Parliamentary Secretary for India and Burma
In office 1943–1944
Prime Minister	Winston Churchill
Preceded by	The Duke of Devonshire
Succeeded by	The Earl of Listowel
Under-Secretary of State for War
In office January 1939 – September 1939
Prime Minister	Neville Chamberlain
Preceded by	The Lord Strathcona and Mount Royal
Succeeded by	The Viscount Cobham
Paymaster General
In office 1938–1939
Prime Minister	Neville Chamberlain
Preceded by	The Lord Hutchison of Montrose
Succeeded by	The Earl Winterton

Member of the House of Lords Lord Temporal
- In office 1928 – 1975; Hereditary Peerage
- Preceded by: Aubrey FitzClarence, 4th Earl of Munster
- Succeeded by: Edward FitzClarence, 6th Earl of Munster

Personal details
- Born: Geoffrey William Richard Hugh FitzClarence; 17 February 1906
- Died: 26 August 1975 (aged 69)
- Party: Conservative
- Spouse: Hilary Wilson (m. 1928)
- Parent(s): The Hon. Harold FitzClarence; Frances Keppel
- Education: Charterhouse School

Geoffrey William Richard Hugh FitzClarence, 5th Earl of Munster, KBE, PC (17 February 1906 – 26 August 1975) was a British peer and Conservative politician.

== Background ==
Munster was the son of Major the Honourable Harold Edward FitzClarence (seventh son of William FitzClarence, 2nd Earl of Munster and Wilhelmina FitzClarence, Countess of Munster) and his wife, Frances Isabel Eleanor (née Keppel) (1874–1951). Through the line of his paternal grandfather, he was a great-great-grandson of William IV, King of the United Kingdom and Hanover. His mother's paternal grandfather, Rev. William Arnold Walpole Keppel, was a male-line great-grandson of Willem van Keppel, 2nd Earl of Albemarle.

Geoffrey Munster was educated at Charterhouse School.

== Political career ==
Munster succeeded his uncle as fifth Earl of Munster in 1928 and took his seat on the Conservative benches in the House of Lords. In 1934, he was appointed a Lord-in-waiting (government whip in the House of Lords) in the National Government of Ramsay MacDonald, a post he held until 1938, the last three years under the premiership firstly of Stanley Baldwin and secondly of Neville Chamberlain. In June 1938, Chamberlain appointed Munster Paymaster General, an office he held until February 1939, when he was made Under-Secretary of State for War. He remained in this position until September 1939.

Munster returned to the government in January 1943 when Winston Churchill appointed him Parliamentary Secretary for India and Burma, a post he held until October 1944, and then served as Under-Secretary of State for the Home Department until July 1945 when Labour came to power. When Churchill became Prime Minister for a second time in 1951, Munster was appointed Under-Secretary of State for the Colonies, an office he retained until 1954, and was then Minister without Portfolio between 1954 and 1957. In 1954, he was admitted to the Privy Council.

== Honours ==
Apart from his political career, Lord Munster was also Lord Lieutenant of Surrey from 1957 to 1973. In the 1957 Birthday Honours he was made a Knight Commander of the Order of the British Empire (KBE)

== Personal life ==
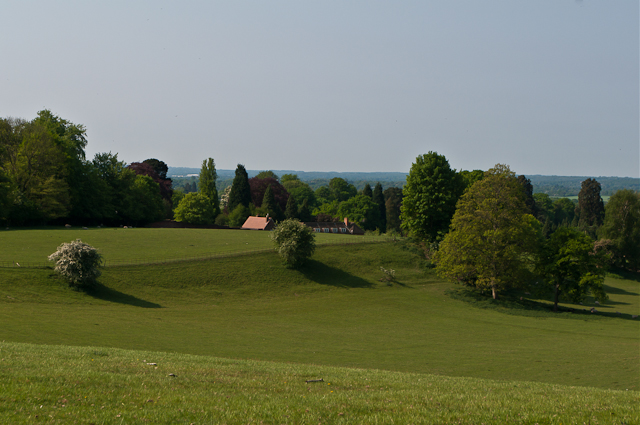
The family's estate in the Greensand Ridge in the parish of Bletchingley in Surrey

Lord Munster married Hilary Wilson in 1928. Lord Munster died in August 1975, aged 69, and was succeeded in his titles by his second cousin, Edward Charles FitzClarence, 6th Earl of Munster.

Hilary FitzClarence, Countess of Munster, was an accomplished musician who founded the Countess of Munster Musical Trust in 1958. She died in 1979 at Sandhills, Bletchingley. Her estate was sworn for probate as £799,392 (equivalent to £3,900,000 in 2025). The house which had at the time more than 10 acres was built in 1893 by Mervyn Macartney in free Tudor style and is protected under UK law with Grade II listing.

== Notes ==
Political offices
Preceded by The Lord Templemore	Lord-in-waiting; 1934–1938	Succeeded by The Earl of Birkenhead
Preceded by The Lord Hutchison of Montrose	Paymaster General; 1938–1939	Succeeded by The Earl Winterton
Preceded by The Lord Strathcona and Mount Royal	Under-Secretary of State for War; 1939	Succeeded by The Viscount Cobham
Preceded by The Duke of Devonshire	Parliamentary Secretary for India and Burma; 1943–1944	Succeeded by The Earl of Listowel
Preceded by Osbert Peake	Under-Secretary of State for the Home Department; 1944–1945	Succeeded by George Oliver
Preceded by Thomas Fotheringham-Cook	Under-Secretary of State for the Colonies; 1951–1954	Succeeded by The Lord Lloyd
Honorary titles
Preceded by Sir Robert Haining	Lord Lieutenant of Surrey; 1957–1973	Succeeded by The Lord Hamilton of Dalzell
Peerage of the United Kingdom
Preceded by Aubrey FitzClarence	Earl of Munster; 1928–1975	Succeeded by Edward FitzClarence
