= George FitzClarence, 1st Earl of Munster =

British Army general (1794–1842)

Major-General The Right Honourable The Earl of Munster GCH PC FRS FRAS
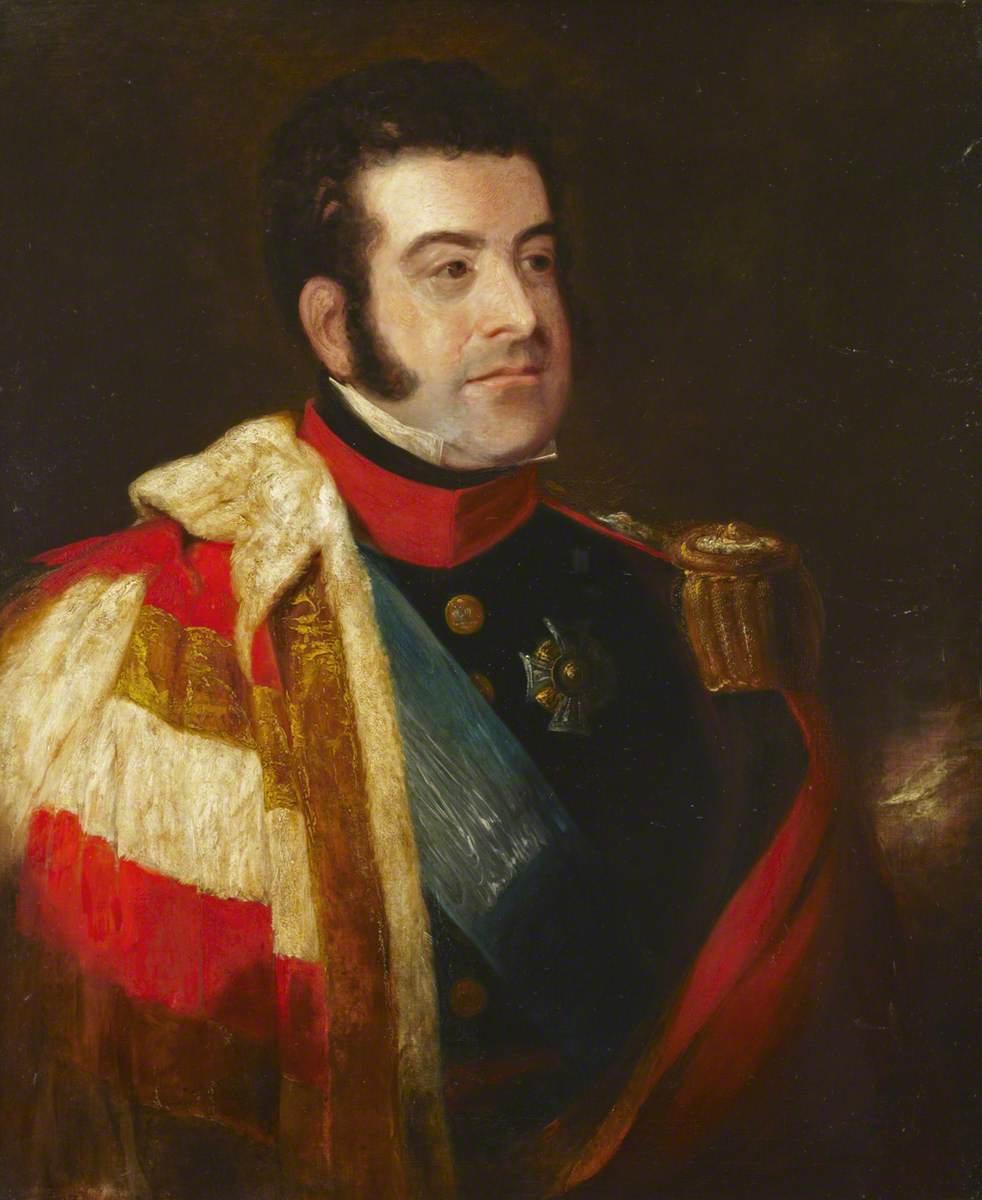
- Born: George Augustus Frederick FitzClarence; 29 January 1794
- Died: 20 March 1842 (aged 48); London, England
- Noble family: FitzClarence
- Spouse: Mary Wyndham (m. 1819)
- Issue: Lady Adelaide FitzClarence; Lady Augusta FitzClarence, Baroness Bonde; William FitzClarence, 2nd Earl of Munster; Hon. Frederick FitzClarence; Lady Mary FitzClarence; Hon. George FitzClarence; Hon. Edward FitzClarence
- Father: William IV
- Mother: Dorothea Jordan
- Occupation: Peer, soldier

George Augustus Frederick FitzClarence, 1st Earl of Munster, GCH, PC, FRS, FRAS (29 January 1794 – 20 March 1842), was an English peer and soldier.

== Biography ==
Arms of FitzClarence, Earl of Munster: The royal arms of King William IV (without the escutcheon of the Arch Treasurer of the Holy Roman Empire and without the Crown of Hanover) debruised by a baton sinister azure charged with three anchors or

The eldest illegitimate son of Prince William, Duke of Clarence and St Andrews (later King William IV; his surname was derived from his father's dukedom) and his long-time mistress Dorothea Jordan, he was well-educated, although his written English was poor (as was that of several of his royal uncles). Like his siblings, he had little contact with his mother after his parents separated in 1811, preferring to rely on his expectations from his father. He served as an army officer during the Peninsular War and subsequently in India. His father, though proud of his military record, was deeply concerned about his drinking and gambling, vices to which many of William's brothers were prone.

His father acceded to the throne in 1830 on the death of King George IV. He was created Earl of Munster, Viscount FitzClarence and Baron Tewkesbury on 4 June 1831, and made a Privy Counsellor in 1833. "Earl of Munster" had been a title held by his father before his accession. George, like his siblings, was dissatisfied with the provisions made for him and this, combined with his increasing mental instability, caused a series of quarrels with his father, which ended in a complete breach in relations between them. The estrangement caused the King great distress, but those close to him thought it better that there be as little contact as possible, since Munster's visits invariably upset his father. Even the death of Munster's sister Sophia, Lady De L'Isle, the King's favourite child, in April 1837, did not bring about a reconciliation.

He gained the rank of major-general in the British Army and held the office of aide-de-camp to his father King William IV between 1830 and 1837. He held the office of Lieutenant of the Tower of London between 1831 and 1833, was Constable and Governor of Windsor Castle between 1833 and 1842.

Munster was aide-de-camp to his first cousin Queen Victoria between 1837 and 1841. In June 1838, he attended her coronation. He was elected president of the Royal Asiatic Society in 1841.

== Marriage and children ==
FitzClarence married Mary Wyndham (29 August 1792 – 3 December 1842), daughter of George Wyndham, 3rd Earl of Egremont and his mistress Elizabeth Fox, on 18 October 1819. They had seven children:

- Lady Adelaide Georgiana FitzClarence (28 August 1820 – 11 October 1883); died unmarried.
- Lady Augusta Margaret FitzClarence (29 July 1822 – 5 September 1846); married Baron Knut Philip Bonde in Paris in 1844, died of childbed fever in Katrineholm, Sweden, one daughter (Ingeborg Augusta Sofia Bonde, 1846–1872).
- William George FitzClarence, 2nd Earl of Munster (19 May 1824 – 30 April 1901).
- Hon Frederick Charles George FitzClarence (1 February 1826 – 17 December 1878); married his first cousin Adelaide Augusta Wilhelmine Sidney, daughter of his father's younger sister Sophia FitzClarence; no issue.
- Lady Mary Gertrude FitzClarence (ca. 1832 – 1834); died in infancy.
- Captain Hon George FitzClarence (15 April 1836 – 24 March 1894); married Maria Henrietta Scott [retrieved 9 March 2024] (d. 1912), had issue, including Charles FitzClarence. Grandfather of the 6th Earl of Munster and great-grandfather of the 7th (and last) Earl.
- Lieutenant Hon Edward FitzClarence (8 July 1837 – 23 July 1855); unmarried, died of wounds during the Siege of Sevastopol in the Crimean War.

== Death ==
FitzClarence died by suicide at the age of 48 in London. He shot himself with a pistol presented to him by King George IV, then Prince of Wales. The first shot only wounded his hand; while his footman went for help, having been told there had been an accident, Lord Munster put the gun in his mouth with his left hand and shot himself in the head. His suicide came as no surprise to his family, who had long been concerned about his mental condition; his father's biographer attributes it to "a paranoiac sense of persecution." At his inquest, his doctor and a surgeon told the coroner that they believed he was going mad, and in recent years there has been speculation that he suffered from the probably hereditary malady of porphyria which may have afflicted his grandfather and several other members of the family.

He was succeeded in the earldom and other titles by his eldest son, William. An auction of 'the valuable and extensive library of a nobleman' was offered for sale by Edmund Hodgson on 22 March 1855 (and five following days) in London, and the copy of the catalogue at Cambridge University Library (shelfmark Munby.c.116(9)) has a pencilled attribution to the 'Earl of Munster'. Given the date of the sale, 13 years after the 1st Earl's death, is it hard to know if these were his books or those of his son, but it seems probable that it was the son selling his father's collection.

== Works ==
- Journal of a Route Across India, through Egypt, to England, in the latter end of the year 1817, and the beginning of 1818 (London, 1819).
- Memoirs of the Late War: Comprising the Personal Narrative of Capt. Cooke, the History of the Campaign of 1809 in Portugal, by the Earl of Munster, and a Narrative of the Campaign of 1814 in Holland (1831); An account of his experiences in the Peninsular War
- Fahrasat al-kutub allatī narghabu an nabtāʻahā wa-al-masāyil allatī tuwaḍḍiḥu jins al-kutub allatī narghabu al-ḥuṣūl ʻalayhā innamā najhalu asmāyihā wa-al-masāyil fī ʻilm al-ḥarb (فهرسة الكتب التي نرغب أن نبتاعها والمسايل التي توضح جنس الكتب التي نرغب الحصول عليها انما نجهل اسمايها والمسايل في علم الحرب) (1840); on the art of Islamic warfare, a catalogue list of library desiderata in Arabic, Persian, Turkish, and Hindustani, compiled by Aloys Sprenger and commissioned by FitzClarence.
- Meadows of gold and mines of gems (translation from the Arabic 'Murudj al-dhaha'; مروج الذهب), (London, 1841); by Aloys Sprenger; English translation of the historical encyclopedia by the tenth-century Abbasid scholar al-Masudi dedicated to FitzClarence Earl of Munster. In his preface the Austrian orientalist acknowledges the earl's assistance correcting and rendering the Arabic into the English idiom, and in the compilation of the notes.

Honorary titles
Preceded by William Loftus	Lieutenant of the Tower of London; 1831–1833	Succeeded by Lord Frederick FitzClarence
Preceded by The Marquess Conyngham	Constable of Windsor Castle; 1833–1842	Succeeded by Prince Augustus Frederick
Peerage of the United Kingdom
New creation	Earl of Munster; 1831–1842	Succeeded by William FitzClarence
