= Dorothea Jordan =

Anglo-Irish actress (1761–1816)

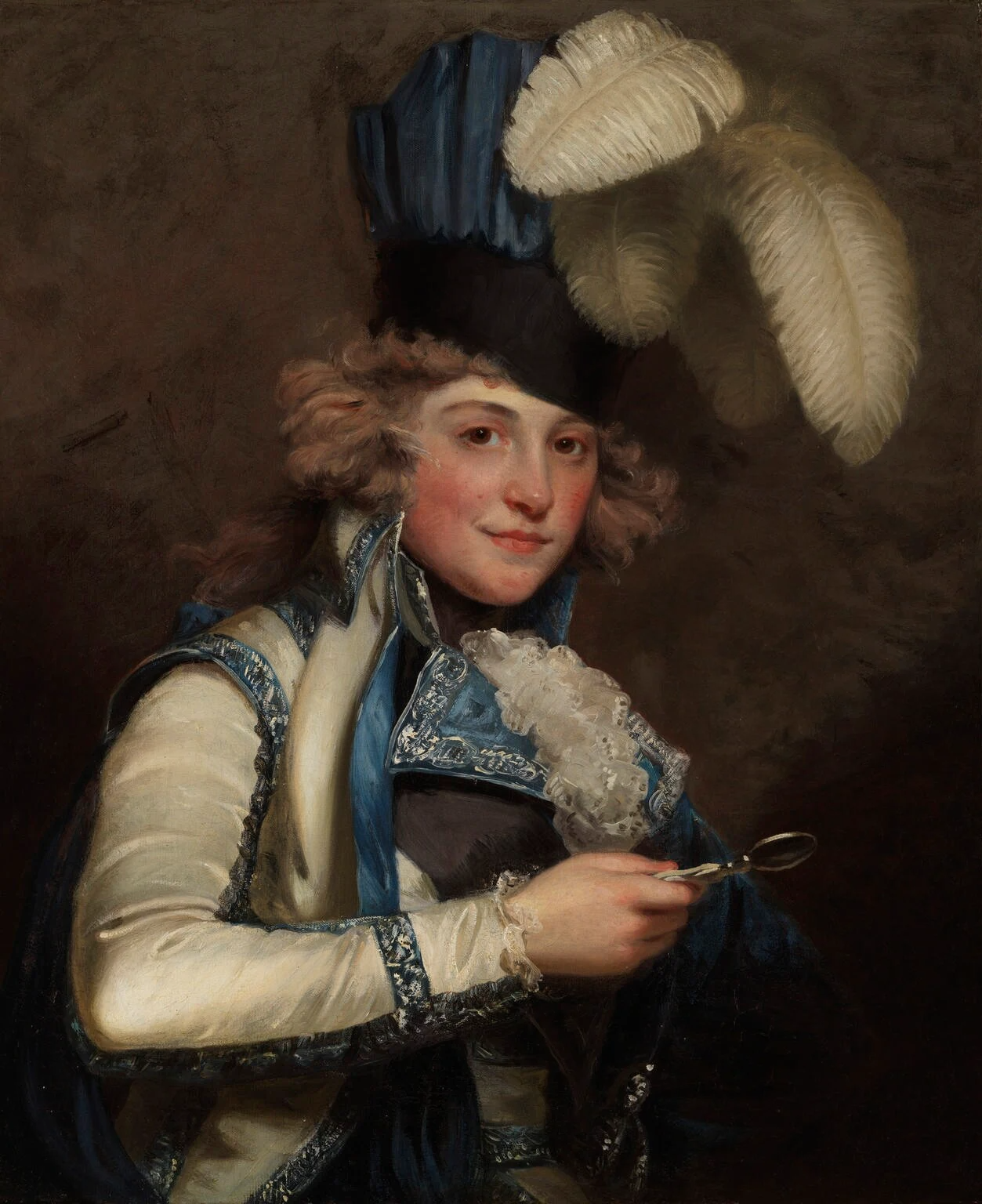
- Dorothea Jordan as Hippolyta, painting by John Hoppner, first exhibited 1791 (previously in the National Gallery and Tate collections, now on loan to the National Portrait Gallery)
- Born: Dorothea Bland; 22 November 1761; County Waterford, Ireland
- Died: 5 July 1816 (aged 54); Saint-Cloud, France
- Other names: Dorothea Phillips, Dora Jordan, Madame James, Mrs FitzClarence
- Occupation: Actress
- Partners: Richard Daly; Charles Doyne; Tate Wilkinson; George Inchbald; Richard Ford; The Duke of Clarence (later William IV)
- Children: with Richard Daly; Frances Alsop; with Richard Ford; Dorothea Maria March; Lady Lucy Hester Hawker; with William IV; George FitzClarence, 1st Earl of Munster; Henry FitzClarence; Sophia Sidney, Baroness De L'Isle and Dudley; Lady Mary Fox; Lord Frederick FitzClarence; Elizabeth Hay, Countess of Erroll; Lord Adolphus FitzClarence; Lady Augusta Hallyburton; Lord Augustus FitzClarence; Amelia Cary, Viscountess Falkland

Dorothea Jordan (née Bland; 22 November 1761 – 5 July 1816) was an Anglo-Irish actress. She was the long-time partner of Prince William, Duke of Clarence (later King William IV), and the mother of 10 illegitimate children by him, all of whom took the surname FitzClarence. She was known professionally as Dorothea Francis and Dorothea Jordan, was informally Dora Jordan, and she was commonly referred to as Mrs Jordan and Mrs FitzClarence.

== Early life ==
Dorothea Bland was born near Waterford City in Ireland on 22 November 1761, and was baptised at St Martin in the Fields, Middlesex, on 5 December of that year. She was the third of six children born to Francis Bland (1736 – 2 January 1778, in Dover) and his mistress, Grace Phillips (c. 1740 – 1789 in Edinburgh). Her siblings were:

- George Bland (c. 1758 – 1807 in Boston, Massachusetts; actor and singer)
- Hester Bland (baptised 2 March 1760 at St Anne Soho, Middlesex – buried at St David's, as of Trelethin, 8 March 1848)
- Lucy Bland (1763/64 – 1778 in Trelethin, St David's, 1778)
- Francis Bland (fl. 1813; a captain, unmarried and without issue)
- Nathaniel Phillips Bland (1766/67 – buried at St David's, Pembrokeshire, 3 June 1830).

Her paternal grandparents were Nathaniel Bland (1695/96, in Killarney, County Kerry – 1760), Vicar General of Ardfert and Aghadoe, and Judge of the Prerogative Court of Dublin, Ireland, and his second wife Lucy (née Heaton). The reports about Jordan's maternal ancestry are unproven; Grace Phillips has been described as the daughter of a Welsh clergyman, whose parish was at Trelethyn.

Before April 1774, when she was age 13, Jordan's father, who worked as a stagehand, abandoned the family to marry an Irish actress. However, he continued to support the family by sending them meagre sums of money. This allowance was on the condition that the children would not use his last name. Jordan then adopted her mother's maiden name, Phillips.

== Theatrical career ==
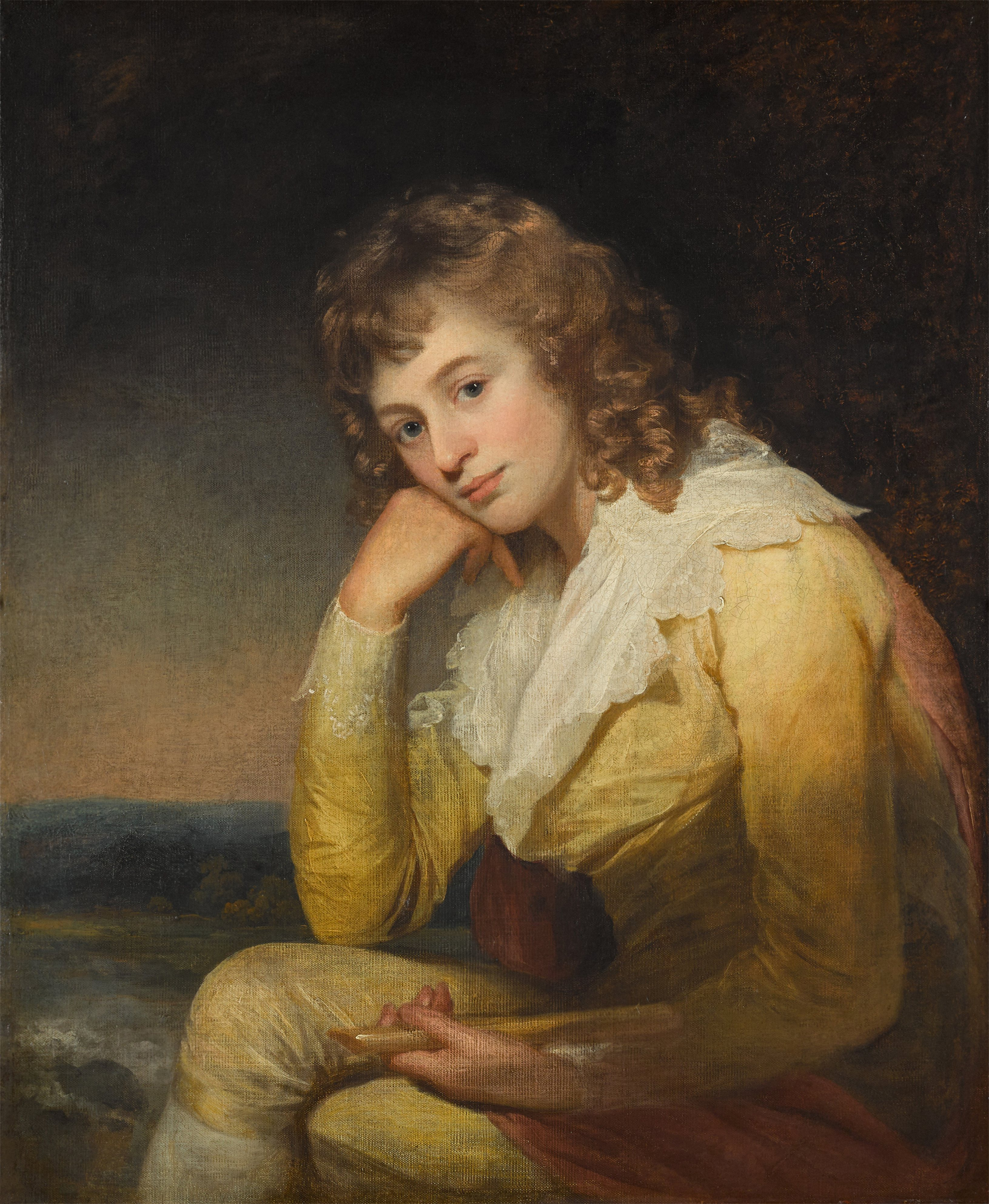
Dorothea Jordan as Rosalind by William Beechey, 1787

The historical record of Jordan's first stage appearance is not clear. Some sources claim that she made her debut in 1777 in Dublin as Phoebe in As You Like It, whilst others suggest she premiered as Lucy in the Interlude The Virgin Unmask'd, on 3 November 1779. The knowledge of Jordan's time and other roles performed in Ireland is fragmentary; however, she is known to have played Priscilla Tomboy in Bickerstaff's The Romp, Anne Neville in Richard III, and Adelaide in the tragedy The Count of Narbonne. At the Smock Alley Theatre, under the management of Richard Daly, Jordan began playing male roles in the company's "reversed" cast. Documentation shows her last appearance in Dublin came on 16 May 1782 when she spoke The Maid of Oaks' Prologue. At the time she was pregnant with the illegitimate child of Daly, who was married.

Rumours spread and she fled to England, specifically Leeds, where she was employed by Tate Wilkinson, manager of the York Company. It was during this move that she adopted the surname "Jordan," and like all the other women in the company (both unmarried and married), adopted the title "Mrs". Her first performance in England was the tragic role of Calista in The Fair Penitent on 11 July 1782, for which she had been tutored by the scholar Cornelious Swan. Wilkinson paid her 15 shillings a week, and she quickly won over the favour of her audiences, packing theatres. Despite her versatile acting talents, the critics were not pleased with her performing tragedy roles. Dora faced harsh criticism for these roles as she was not considered socially acceptable to play women of a higher standing. Swan wrote to Tate to express his amazement at Jordan's talents:

"For really Wilkinson," said he, "I have given the Jordan but three lessons, and she is so adroit at receiving my instructions, that I declare she repeats the character as well as Mrs. Cibber ever did."

Jordan performed in the Yorkshire Circuit with Wilkinson's company from 1782 to 1785. She was able to learn her lines quickly and seemed to have a natural talent, which made the other actresses in the company jealous. In her first few months, she was given the role of Fanny in The Clandestine Marriage, which only made her more unpopular with the women in the company.

During this first tour, while in Hull, Jordan gave birth to her first daughter Frances. After the delivery, while she cared for the baby, the actresses of the company "blackened her character among the people of Hull." When she returned to the stage on Boxing Day playing Calista in The Fair Penitent, she was met with strong disapproval. Audiences felt that the similarities between Jordan and Calista were too strong. However, Wilkinson came to Jordan's aid to dispel the gossip, painting Jordan as a mild-mannered victim. Through Wilkinson's support and Jordan's hard work and good nature, she was eventually able to win over the people before the company returned to York.

Some time later, while in York, Sarah Siddons came to visit Wilkinson and saw Dora Jordan perform in one of her popular breeches roles. Siddons, however, was not impressed with Jordan's performance and said that she should remain on the Yorkshire Circuit for she was "not up to London." This remark was soon discounted when William Smith came from London and offered Jordan a salary of £4 per week at Drury Lane. She took the offer and performed for Wilkinson's company for a final time on 9 September 1785 before departing to London with her mother, two-year-old daughter, and sister Hester.

Although no specific dates can be sourced, Dora is believed to have performed the role of Lady Teazle in Sheridan's The School for Scandal before she arrived in London. In 1785, she made her first London appearance at Drury Lane as Peggy in The Country Girl. The Morning Post the next day reported on her performance:

Nature has endowed her with talents sufficient to combat and excel her competitors in the same walk. Her person and manner are adapted for representing the peculiarities of youthful innocence and frivolity; and her tones of voice are audible and melodious.

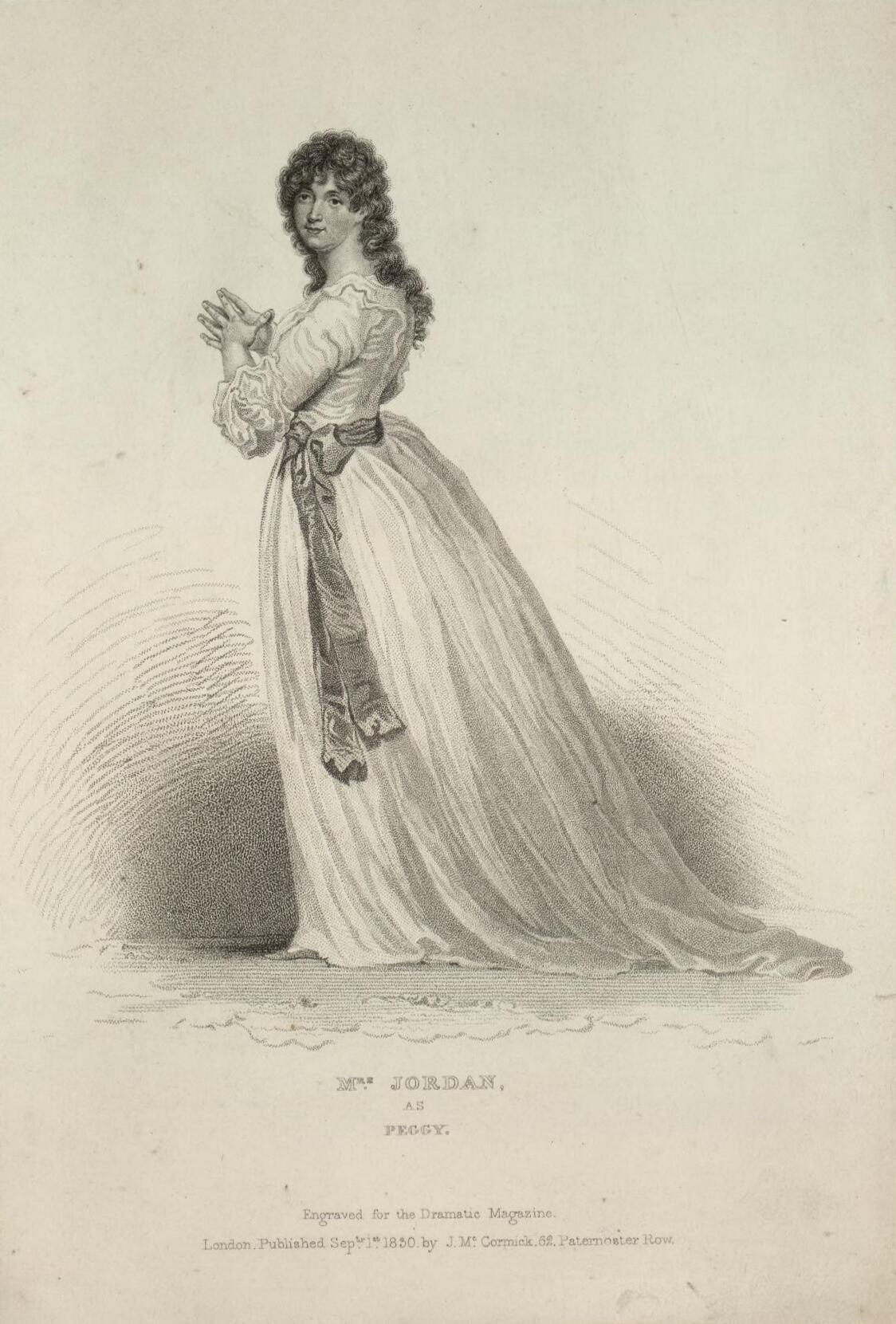
Mrs. Jordan in her role of Peggy in The Country Girl, David Garrick's tamer adaption of Wycherley's earlier, more scandalous play The Country Wife

Gradually, it came to be recognised that her talent lay in comedy. She was acclaimed for her "naturalness" on stage, and called a "child of nature", a slightly derogatory term for someone who is of illegitimate birth. Audiences also enjoyed her performances in such breeches roles as Viola in Twelfth Night, Sir Harry Wildair in The Constant Couple, and William in Rosina.

In addition to her being "the most admired comic actress of her time", Jordan was a competent Shakespearean and tragic actress, playing the roles of Ophelia, Imogen in Cymbeline, Emilia in Othello, and Zara in Aaron Hill's play of that name. When she first auditioned for Wilkinson, on being asked whether she preferred "tragedy, comedy, or opera?" she answered "All."

Play them "all" she did, but Jordan found less success in playing women of higher social standing with some individuals believing that she lacked the "artifice and incisiveness" of other actresses who commonly played such roles.

In addition to playing at Drury Lane and Covent Garden, Jordan continued to return to the provincial circuits. She returned to Wilkinson's Circuit in York several times, as well as Edinburgh, Margate, Liverpool, Bath, Bristol, and Manchester.

Her engagement at Drury Lane lasted until 1809, and she played a large variety of parts. During the rebuilding of Drury Lane she played at the Haymarket; she transferred her services in 1811 to Covent Garden. Here, in 1814, she made her last appearance on the London stage, and the following year, at Margate, retired altogether.

During her time on the stage, she wrote the popular song "The Bluebells of Scotland", published under her name around 1800.

In 1815, the renowned theatre critic, William Hazlitt, wrote:

Mrs Jordan's excellences were all natural to her. It was not as an actress, but as herself, that she charmed everyone. Nature had formed in her most prodigal humour; and when nature is in the humour to make a woman all that is delightful, she does it most effectually ... Mrs Jordan, the child of nature, whose voice was a cordial to the heart, because it came from it, rich, full, like the luscious juice of the rich grape.

== Relationships and children ==
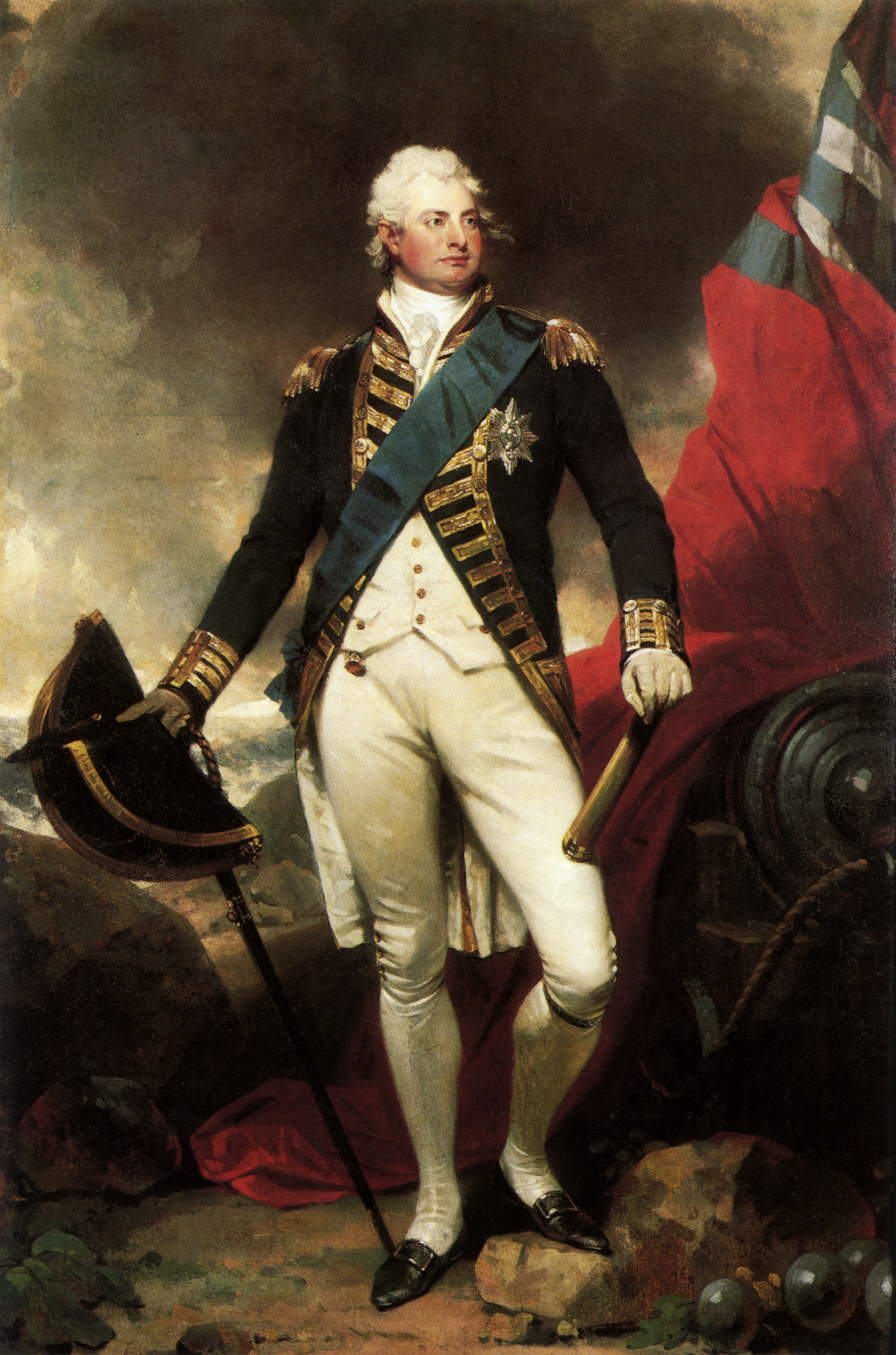
Portrait of the Duke of Clarence by Martin Archer Shee, 1800. Jordan was in a long-standing relationship with the third son of George III, who later inherited the throne as William IV.

=== Charles Doyne ===
While working as a milliner's assistant, she received her first proposal of marriage, from a man known to posterity only as Smith, whose father considered her much too young to marry. The next proposal came when she was acting in Waterford, where she spent a summer while the Dublin theatres were closed. There she met Charles Doyne, an army lieutenant. He "felt hopeful" of being accepted, but her mother regarded him as unsuitable, and Jordan returned to Dublin intent on success in the theatre.

=== Richard Daly ===
She had an affair with Richard Daly, who was manager of Dublin's Crow Street Theatre and then of Smock Alley. Daly was married, and she had an illegitimate child with him:

- Frances Daly (also called Fanny; born in September 1782; she later changed her name to Frances Bettesworth in 1806 and married Thomas Alsop in 1807; she died 2 June 1821).

Jordan's work with Richard Daly helped establish her as an actress in Dublin until the two separated and she left for England.

She then went to work for the theatre company operated by Tate Wilkinson. It was at this point she adopted the name Mrs. Jordan – a reference to her escape across the Irish Sea, likened to the River Jordan. The name "Mrs Jordan" was also reportedly given to her by Richard Daly for "motherly reasons", soon after she gave birth to their first illegitimate child. She appeared at Wilkinson's York Circuit theatres, including The Theatre, Leeds, where she complained of uncomfortable working conditions.

=== George Inchbald ===
Shortly after her affair with Daly was over, she began an affair with George Inchbald, the male lead in the Wilkinson company. According to biographer Claire Tomalin, Jordan had hopes of their marrying, but he was wary of committing himself; later he regretted this and proposed to her, but she turned him down.

=== Richard Ford ===
In late 1786, Jordan began an affair with Sir Richard Ford, then a police magistrate and lawyer. She moved in with him, believing he intended marriage. They had three illegitimate children:

- Dorothea Maria Ford (born August 1787, married in 1809 to Frederick Edward March, a natural son of Lord Henry FitzGerald).
- A son (who died at birth in October or November 1788).
- Lucy Hester Ford (born 1789, died 1850, married Samuel Hawker—later General and Sir—in 1810).

She left Ford when marriage was no longer possible. Jordan's children were placed under the care of her sister Hester, who moved with them to a house in Brompton. According to a settlement dated 4 November 1791, Jordan transferred all her savings to Ford and Hester for the maintenance and education of the children; in addition, she allowed them an annual payment and granted Hester an allowance for her services.

=== William IV ===
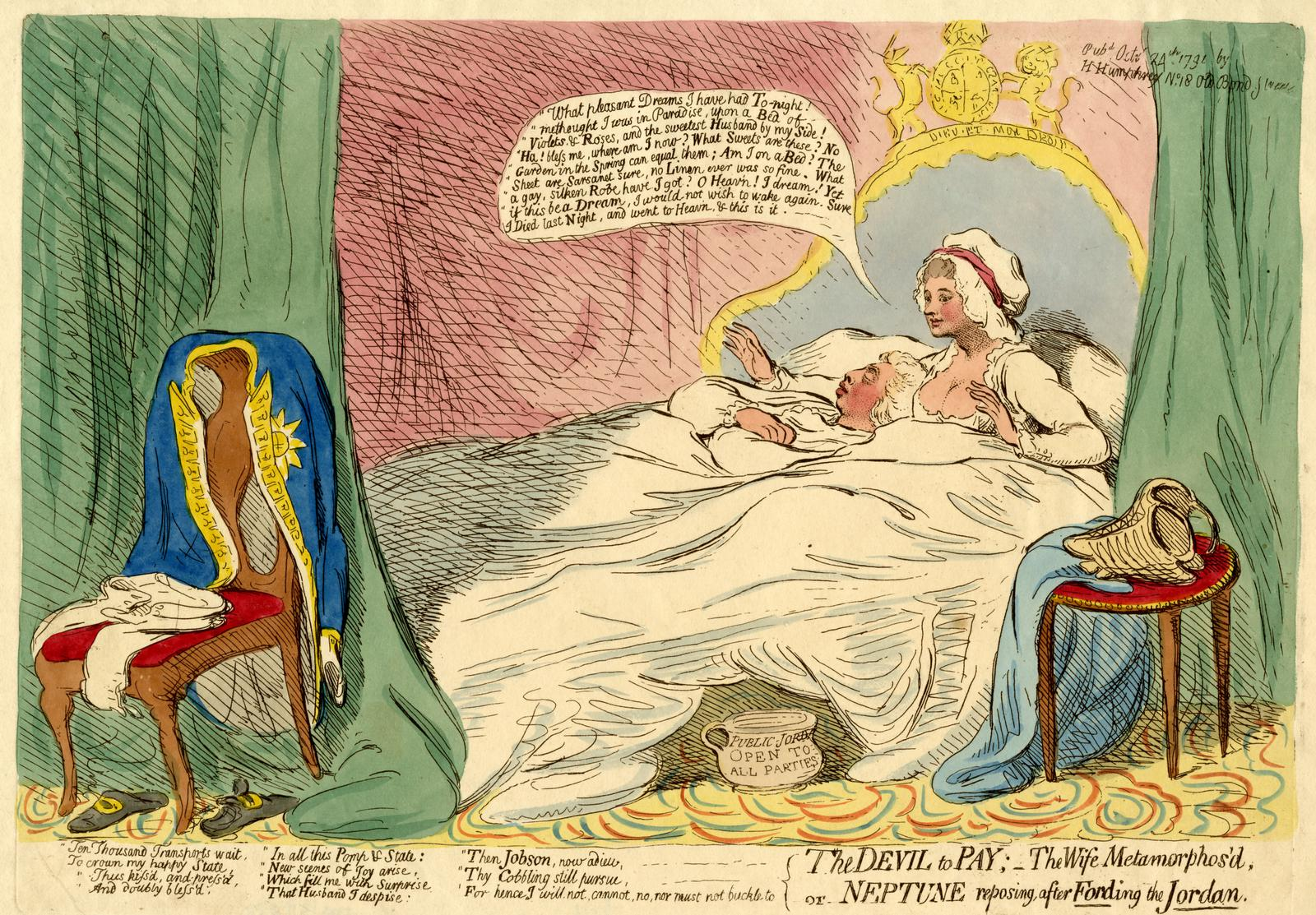
In this 1791 James Gillray cartoon, Jordan is depicted in bed with the Duke of Clarence.

In 1790, Jordan became the mistress of Prince William, Duke of Clarence, the third son of King George III. He had met her at Drury Lane. She began living with him first at Clarence Lodge and later, in 1797, at Bushy House. Together they had 10 illegitimate children, all of whom took the surname FitzClarence:

- George FitzClarence (29 January 1794 – 20 March 1842), created Earl of Munster in 1831. Married Mary Wyndham.
- Henry Edward FitzClarence (27 March 1795 – September 1817). Unmarried.
- Sophia FitzClarence (25 August 1796 – 10 April 1837), married Philip Sidney, 1st Baron De L'Isle and Dudley.
- Mary FitzClarence (19 December 1798 – 13 July 1864), married General Charles Richard Fox. No issue.
- Lieutenant General Lord Frederick FitzClarence GCH (9 December 1799 – 30 October 1854), officer in the British Army. Married Lady Augusta Boyle.
- Elizabeth FitzClarence (17 January 1801 – 16 January 1856), married William Hay, 18th Earl of Erroll.
- Rear-Admiral Lord Adolphus FitzClarence, Royal Guelphic Order, Aide-de-camp, Royal Navy (18 February 1802 – 17 May 1856). Unmarried.
- Augusta FitzClarence (17 November 1803 – 8 December 1865) married, firstly, Hon. John Kennedy-Erskine, 5 July 1827, married secondly, Admiral Lord Frederick Gordon-Hallyburton.
- Lord Augustus FitzClarence (1 March 1805 – 14 June 1854), rector at Mapledurham in Oxfordshire. Married Sarah Elizabeth Catharine Gordon.
- Amelia FitzClarence (21 March 1807 – 2 July 1858), married Lucius Bentinck Cary, 10th Viscount Falkland.

During this time, Jordan was granted a yearly stipend of £1,200 (equivalent to £160,000 in 2025), but she continued to perform at both Drury Lane and Covent Garden as well as on provincial tours until her 1811 separation from Prince William. In 1811, Jordan was given an annual stipend of £4,400 (equivalent to £310,000 in 2025) by Prince William and custody of their daughters while he retained custody of their sons. Half of her stipend was specifically earmarked for the care of the children with a stipulation stating that in order to continue receiving that money, and retain custody, Jordan must not return to the stage.

== Later life and death ==
In 1814, when her son-in-law, Thomas Alsop, became heavily in debt, Jordan returned to the stage to help pay off that debt. Prince William took legal action and removed their remaining daughters from her care and ended Jordan's yearly stipend. Jordan had written letters to British theatres and newspapers pleading with them to rehire her, acknowledging her previous affairs and business dealings with some of her past companions.

Jordan sold her home in 1815 and moved to Boulogne, France, assuming the alias Mrs. James or Madame James or Mrs. Johnson. Not having been summoned back to England, she moved to Versailles by the end of the year. Soon after, she moved to Saint-Cloud, near Paris. While in France, she was defrauded by her eldest daughter, Frances, and son-in-law, Thomas Alsop, after they accumulated large sums of debt in her name. During this time, both her mental and physical health declined, and she suffered from "bilious attacks, pains in her side, swollen ankles, shortness of breath and increasing general weakness". She wrote in a letter "it is not, believe me, the feelings of pride, avarice, or the absence of those comforts I have all my life been accustomed to, that is killing me by inches; it is the loss of my only remaining comfort, the hope I used to live on from time to time, of seeing my children".

She died alone on 5 July 1816 from a ruptured blood vessel caused by violent inflammation of the chest. She was buried in the town cemetery of Saint-Cloud.

== Sources ==
- A. Aspinall ed., Mrs Jordan and Her Family; Being the Unpublished Correspondence of Mrs. Jordan and the Duke of Clarence, Later William IV, Publisher: Arthur Barker, 1951.
- Brian Fothergill, Mrs Jordan: Portrait of an Actress, Publisher: Faber & Faber, 1965.
- Dennis Friedman, Ladies of the Bedchamber, Publisher: Peter Owen, 2003, ISBN 0-7206-1244-6.
- The Delectable Dora Jordan, In Otis Skinner (1928) Mad Folk of the Theatre, Publisher: Ayer Publishing, ISBN 978-0-8369-1851-9.
- Claire Tomalin, Mrs Jordan's Profession: The Story of a Great Actress and a Future King, Publisher: Viking, 17 October 1994, ISBN 0-670-84159-5; US edition. Mrs Jordan's Profession: The Actress and the Prince, Knopf, 1995.
