= 1787 in art =

Events from the year 1787 in art.

== Events ==
- 25 August – The Salon of 1787 opens at the Louvre in Paris
- Seventeen-year-old Thomas Lawrence arrives in London and takes lodgings near Sir Joshua Reynolds.

== Works ==
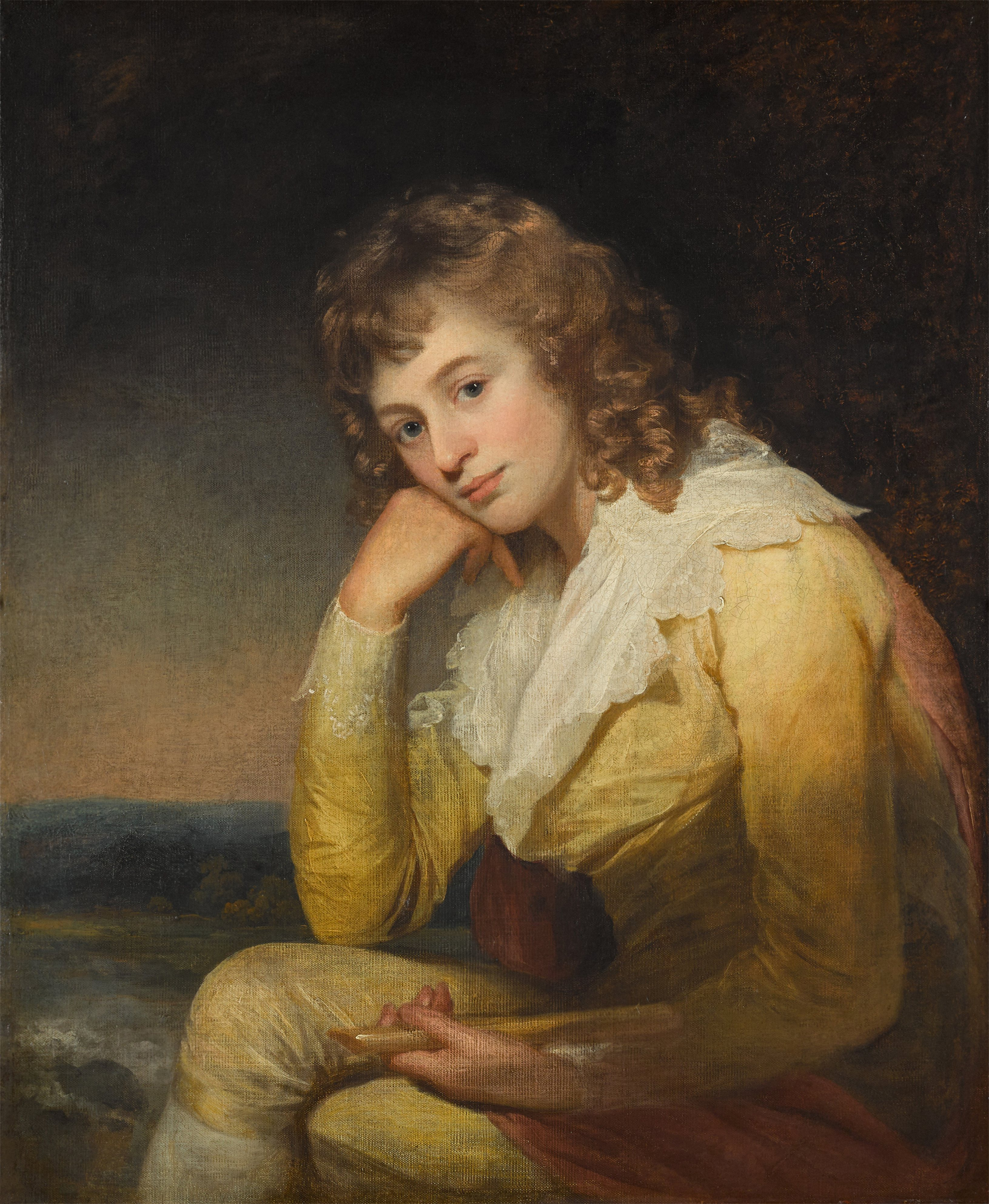
Dorothea Jordan as Rosalind by William Beechey

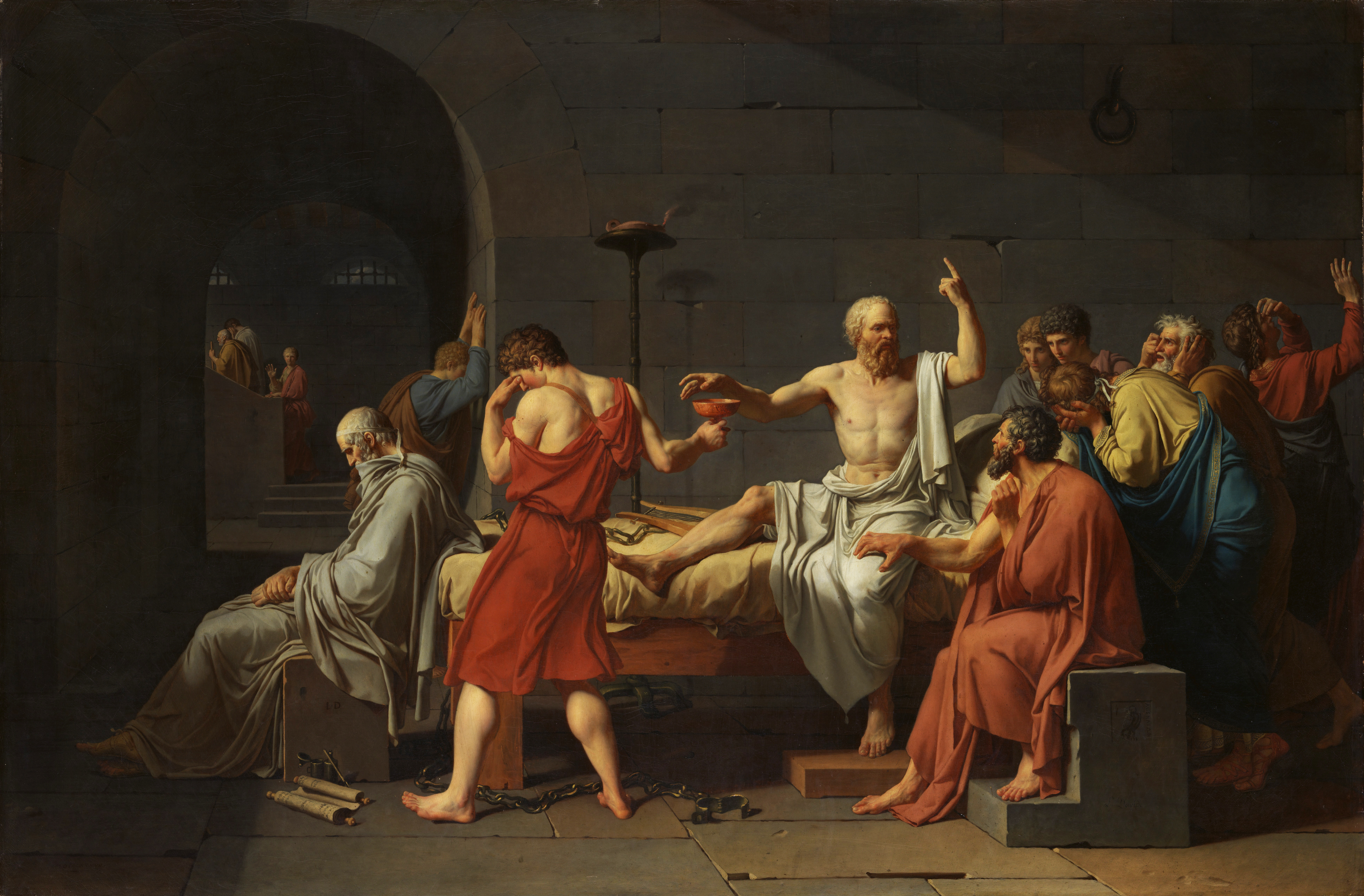
Jacques-Louis David – The Death of Socrates (Metropolitan Museum of Art, New York)

- William Beechey – Dorothea Jordan as Rosalind
- Antonio Canova – Tomb of Pope Clement XIV
- Jacques-Louis David – The Death of Socrates (completed)
- Thomas Gainsborough
  - Georgiana, Duchess of Devonshire
  - Mrs. Richard Brinsley Sheridan
- Francisco Goya
  - Highwaymen Attacking a Coach
  - The Snowstorm (Winter)
  - The Swing
- William Hodges – The Ghauts at Benares
- Louise Élisabeth Vigée Le Brun – Marie Antoinette and her Children (completed)
- Jacques-Antoine-Marie Lemoine – Portrait of a Woman with Her Son and Daughter in a Balcony Window
- Philip James de Loutherbourg – Snowdon from Capel Curig
- Nicolas-André Monsiau – Alexander Taming Bucephalus
- James Northcote – Jael and Sisera
- John Opie – The Murder of Rizzio
- George Romney – Mrs Jordan as Peggy
- Joseph-Benoît Suvée – Admiral Coligny Confronts His Assassins
- Jean-Joseph Taillasson – Virgil Reading the Aeneid to Augustus and Octavia
- Johann Heinrich Wilhelm Tischbein – Goethe in the Campagna
- Benjamin West – The Institution of the Order of the Garter

== Awards ==
- (unknown)

== Births ==
- January 7 – Patrick Nasmyth, Scottish landscape painter (died 1831)
- February 3 – Karl Joseph Brodtmann, Swiss artist, lithographer, printmaker, publisher and bookseller (died 1862)
- March 10 – William Etty, English painter, especially of nudes (died 1849)
- April 9 – William Finden, English line engraver (died 1852)
- August 17 – Maxim Vorobiev, Russian Romantic landscape painter (died 1855)
- August 20 – Jean-Pierre Cortot, French sculptor (died 1843)
- September 11 – Karl Wilhelm Wach, German painter (died 1845)
- September 18 – Johann David Passavant, German painter, curator and artist (died 1861)
- October 2 – Nicolas Gosse, French historical painter (died 1878)
- October 13 – William Brockedon, English painter (died 1854)
- November 18 – Louis Daguerre, French artist and chemist, recognized for his invention of the daguerreotype process of photography (died 1851)
- November 22 – Copley Fielding, English watercolour landscape painter (died 1855)
- December 16 – François Joseph Heim, French painter (died 1865)
- date unknown
  - Heinrich Adam, German painter (died 1862)
  - Giuseppe Bisi, Italian painter, mainly of landscapes (died 1869)
  - Johannes Flintoe, Danish-Norwegian painter of Norwegian landscapes (died 1870)
  - Harriet Gouldsmith, English landscape painter and etcher (died 1863)
  - François-Joseph Navez, Belgian neo-classical painter (died 1869)
  - Xavier Sigalon, French Romantic painter (died 1837)

== Deaths ==
- February 4 – Pompeo Batoni, Italian painter (born 1708)
- March 17 – Anton August Beck, German engraver (born 1713)
- June 23 – Pierre L'Enfant, French painter (born 1704)
- July 25 – Arthur Devis – English portrait painter, particularly known for his conversation pieces and other such small portraits (born 1712)
- September 5 – John Brown, Scottish portrait-draftsman and painter at Edinburgh (born 1749)
- November 10 – Cristoforo Dall'Acqua, Italian painter and engraver (born 1734)
- December 12 – Jean Valade, French painter (born 1710)
- date unknown
  - Mason Chamberlin, English portrait painter (born 1727)
  - John Cheere, English sculptor (born 1709)
  - Nicolas Desportes, French painter of hunting scenes (born 1718)
  - Erik Westzynthius the Younger, Finnish painter (born 1743)
  - Francesco Zugno, Italian Rococo painter (born c. 1708)
- probable - Thomas Engleheart, English sculptor and modeller in wax (date of birth unknown)
