= Royal Academy Exhibition of 1787 =

1787 art exhibition in London

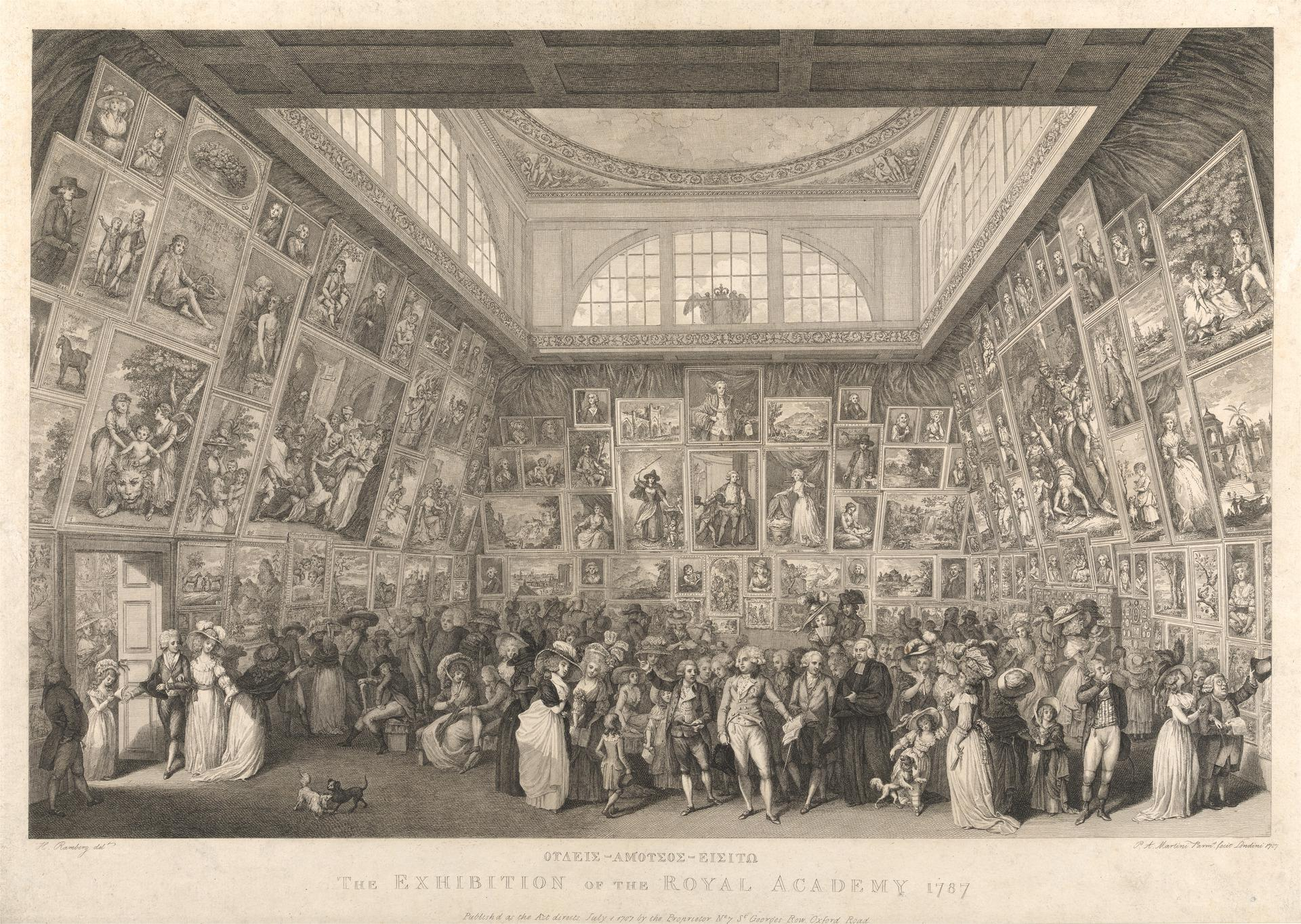
The Exhibition of the Royal Academy, 1787 by Pietro Antonio Martini

The Royal Academy of 1787 was the nineteenth annual Summer Exhibition of the British Royal Academy of Arts. It was held at Somerset House in London between 30 April and 19 June 1787.

With the absence of Thomas Gainsborough and George Romney, both of whom were boycotting the Academy, the President of the Royal Academy Sir Joshua Reynolds was preeminent in the field or portraiture. He sent in thirteen paintings that year. Notable amongst his works was a portrait of George, Prince of Wales the eldest son and heir of George III. At the time controversy was brewing over the secret marriage the prince had conducted, and Reynolds may have tactfully halted completion on his Portrait of Maria Fitzherbert in order to not have it ready in time to feature at the exhibition. Reynolds attracted praise for his Heads of Angels and Lady Smith and Her Children. In addition Reynolds displayed his Portrait of James Boswell, featuring the Scottish author and fellow member of The Club. Other portrait painters submitting works included William Beechey and Maria Cosway.

The eighteen year old Thomas Lawrence, a former child prodigy who has gained a growing reputation in Bath, Somerset, made his exhibition debut. In the fashionable spa town he produced portraits of society figures such as the Duchess of Devonshire. At the academy he displayed several portraits in pastels as well as The Mad Girl. Although his submissions that year attracted little attention, Lawrence would go on to be the leading portrait painter of the Regency era.

The American Benjamin West displayed an oil sketch for the history painting The Institution of the Order of the Garter, commissioned by the king for Windsor Castle as part of a series of paintings depicting the first Edwardian era, but did not show the finished work until the 1792 Exhibition. West also submitted a painting of the shipwrecked Saint Paul intended for the chapel at Greenwich Hospital. In the opinion of some critics that year's exhibition was saved by the display of two historical works The Murder of Rizzio by John Opie, featuring a scene from sixteenth century Scotland, and James Northcote's The Death of Wat Tyler set in London during the Peasant's Revolt.

William Hodges showed several landscapes inspired by his visit to India. The French-born Philip James de Loutherbourg displayed early Romantic scenes including Snowdon from Capel Curig. The animal painter George Stubbs submitted Bulls Fighting. The Salon of 1787 was held the same year at the Louvre in Paris.

== Gallery ==
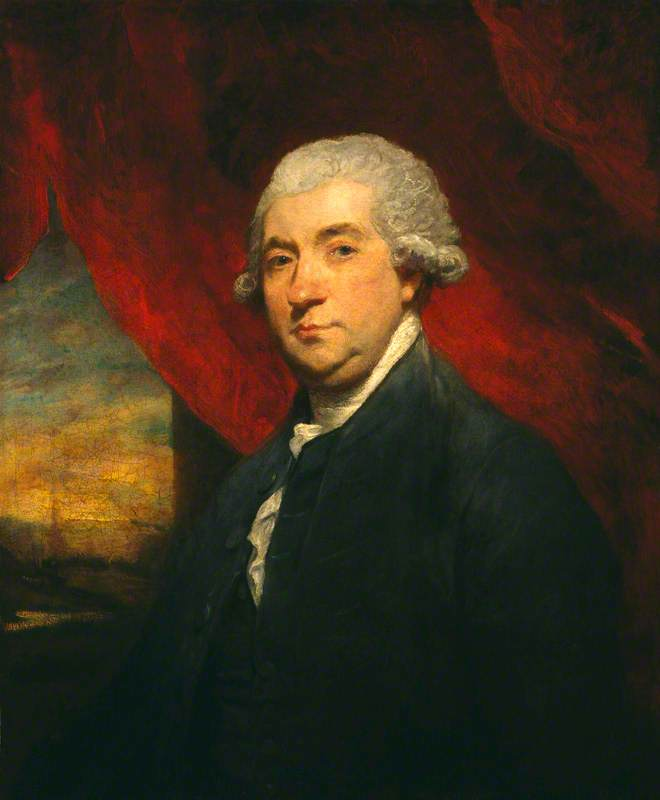
Portrait of James Boswell by Joshua Reynolds

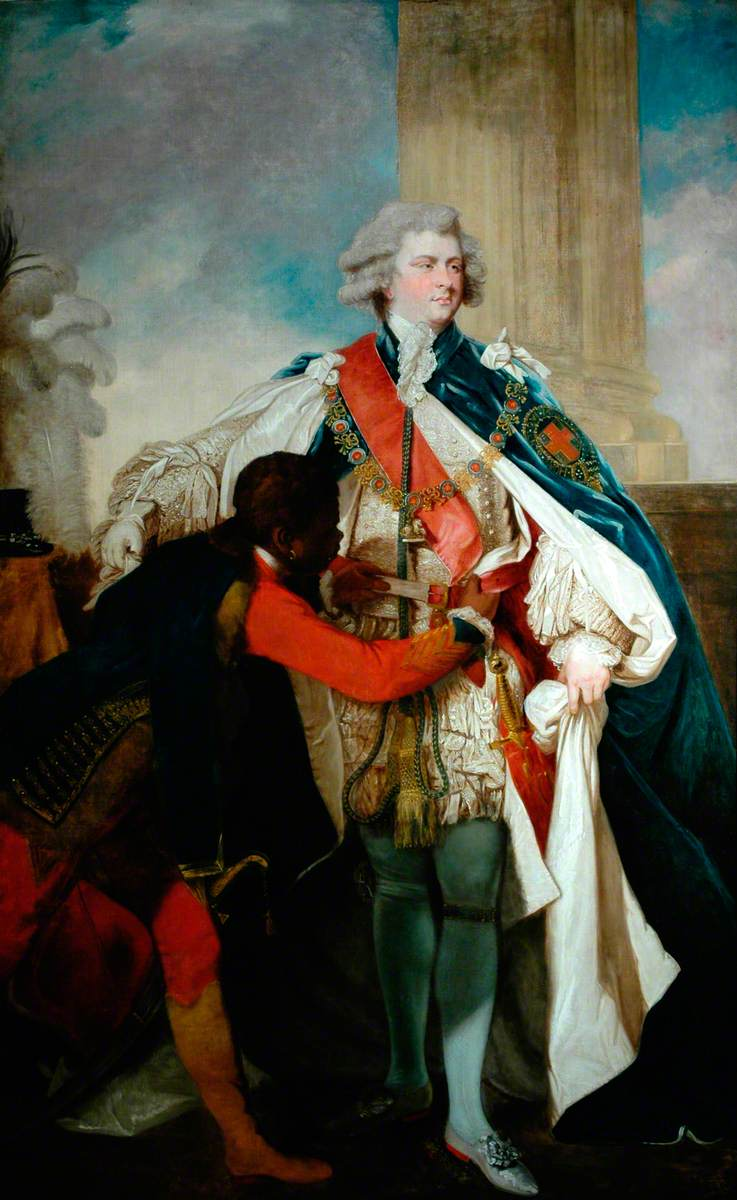
Portrait of George, Prince of Wales by Joshua Reynolds

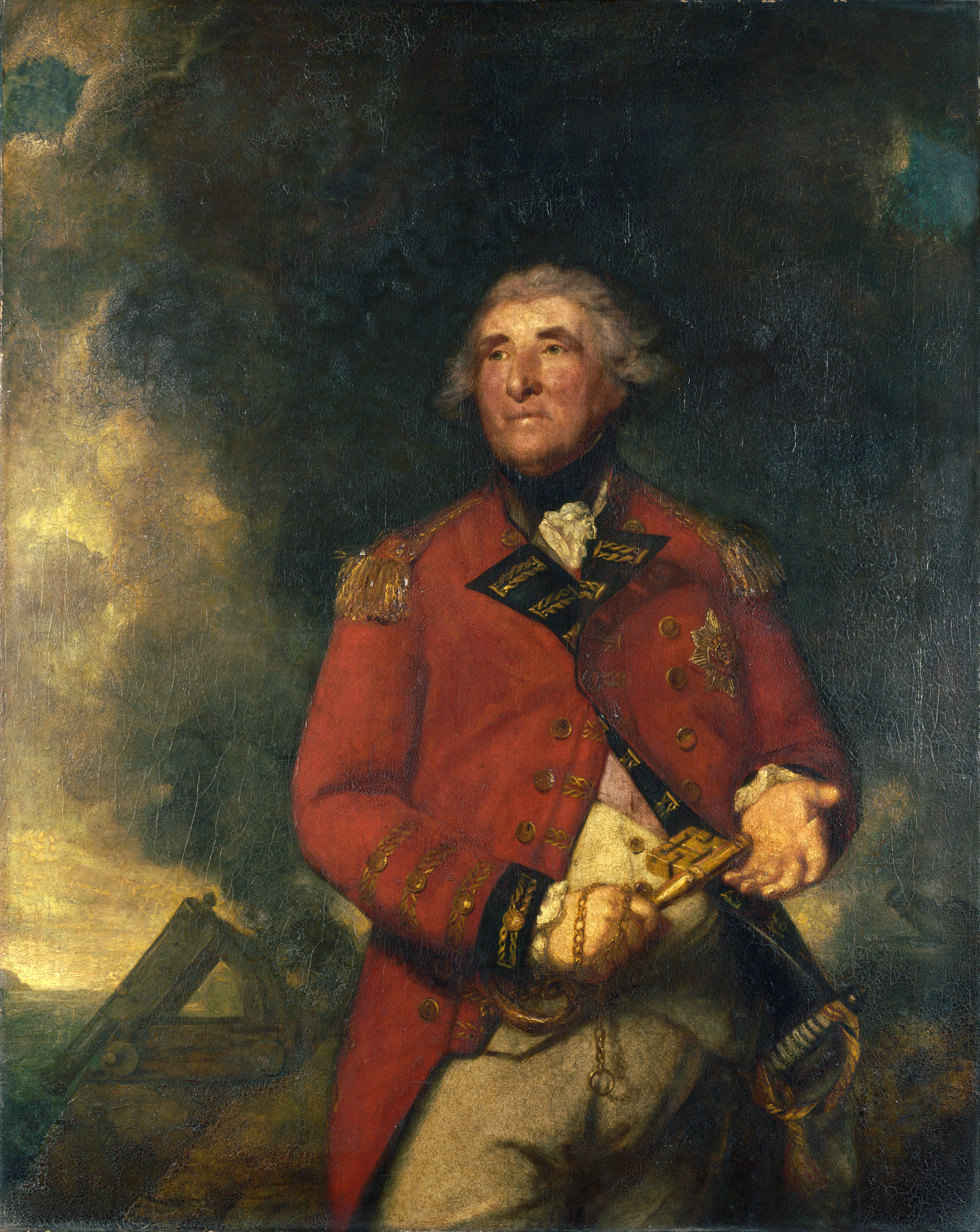
Portrait of Lord Heathfield by Joshua Reynolds

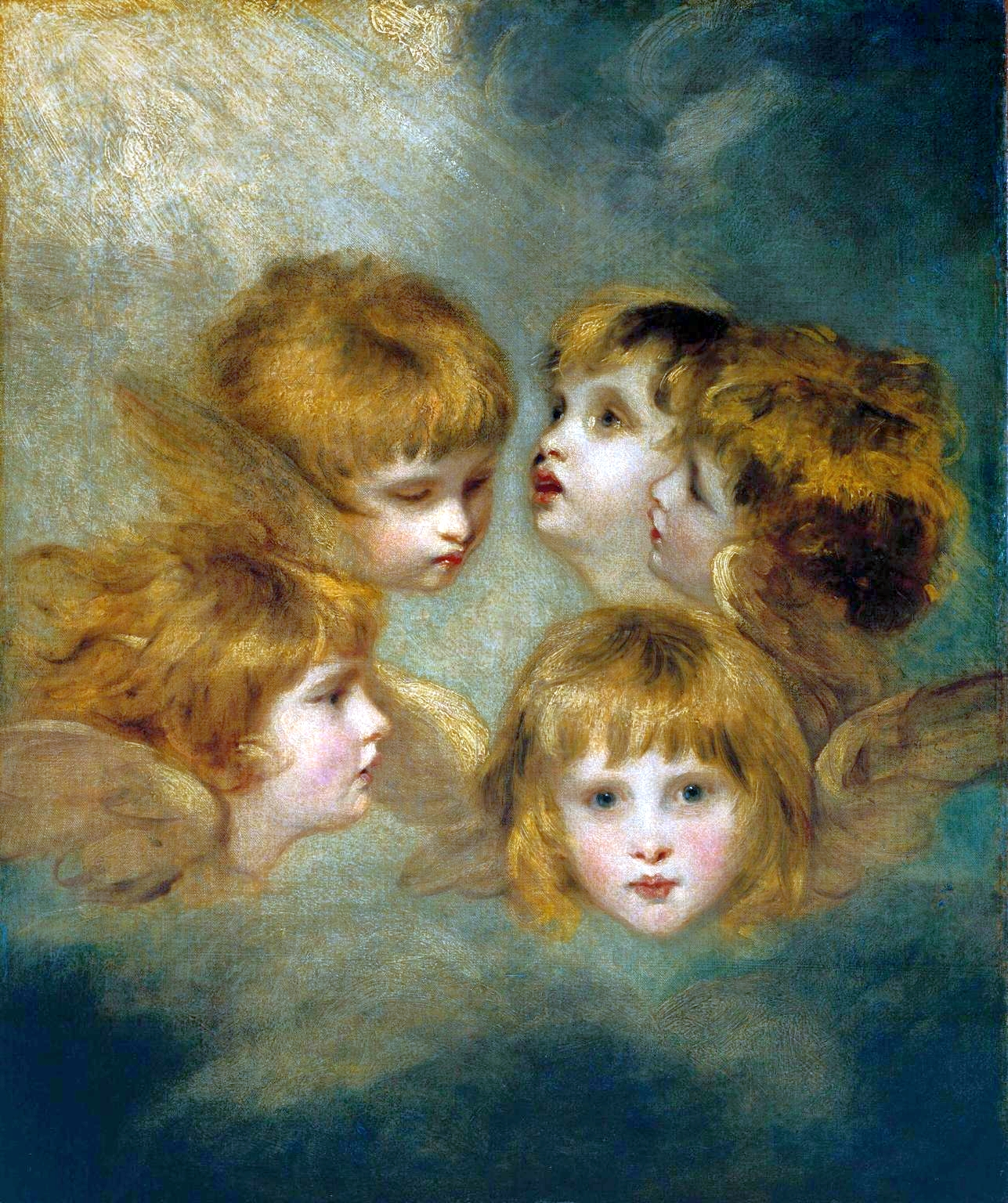
Heads of Angels by Joshua Reynolds

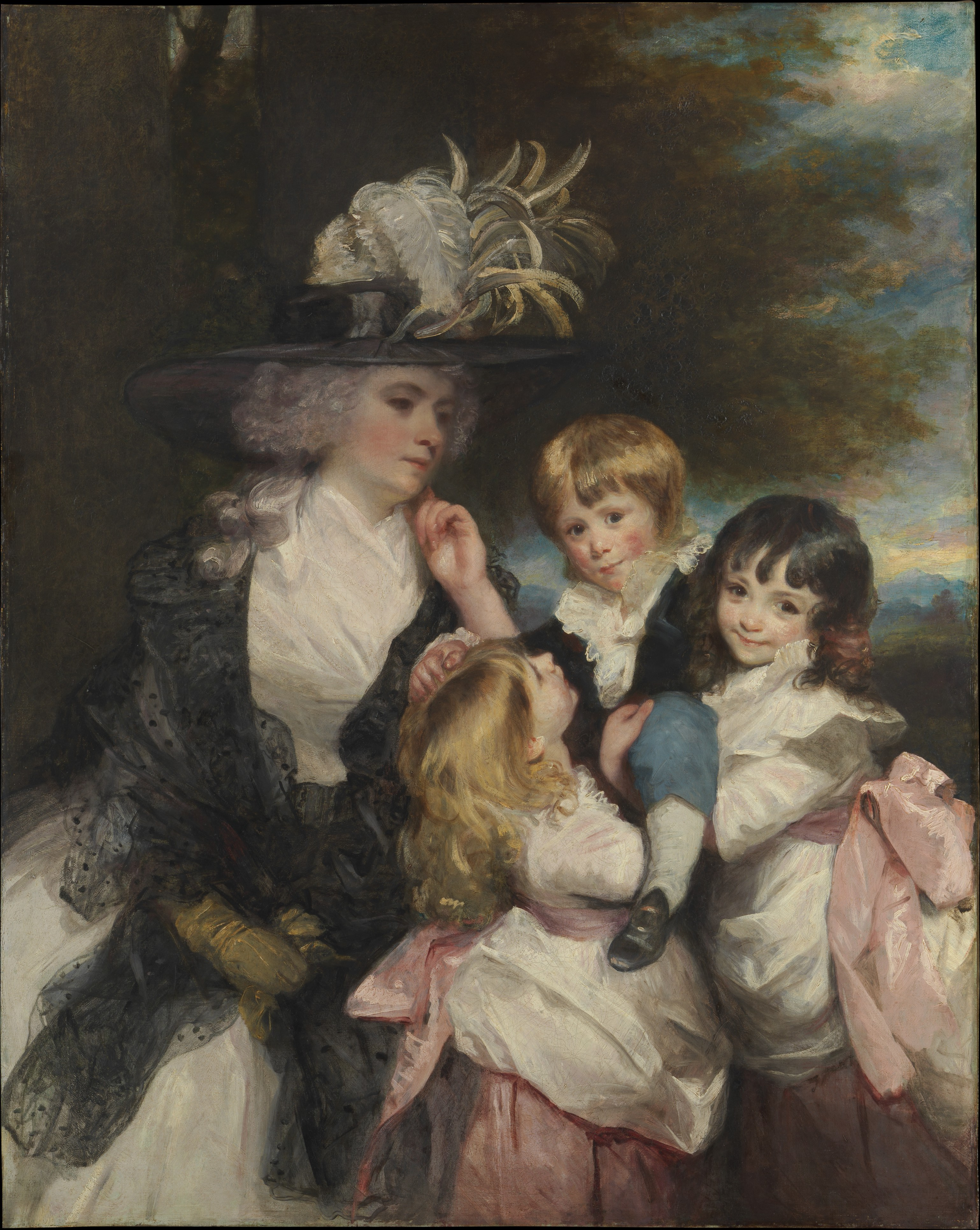
Lady Smith and Her Children by Joshua Reynolds

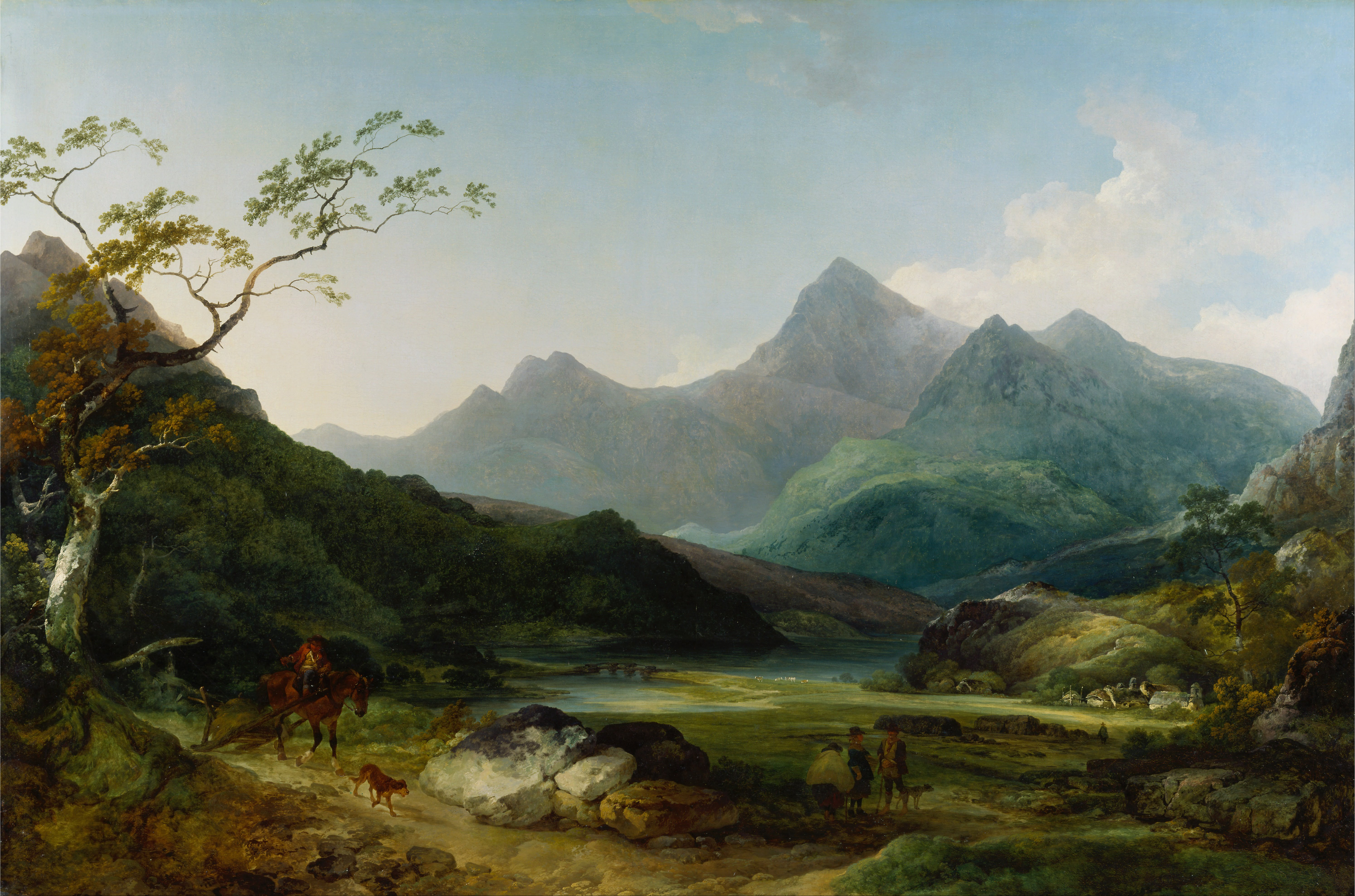
Snowdon from Capel Curig by Philip James de Loutherbourg

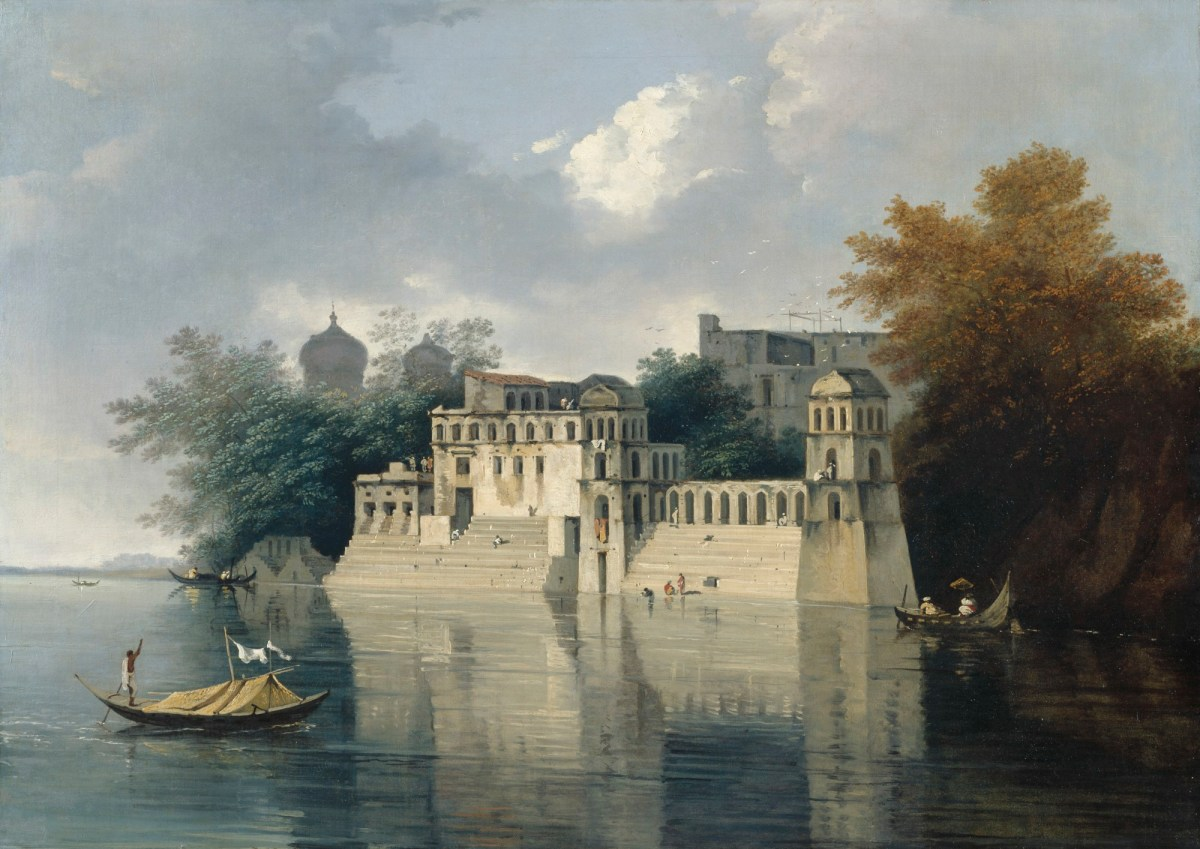
The Ghauts at Benares by William Hodges

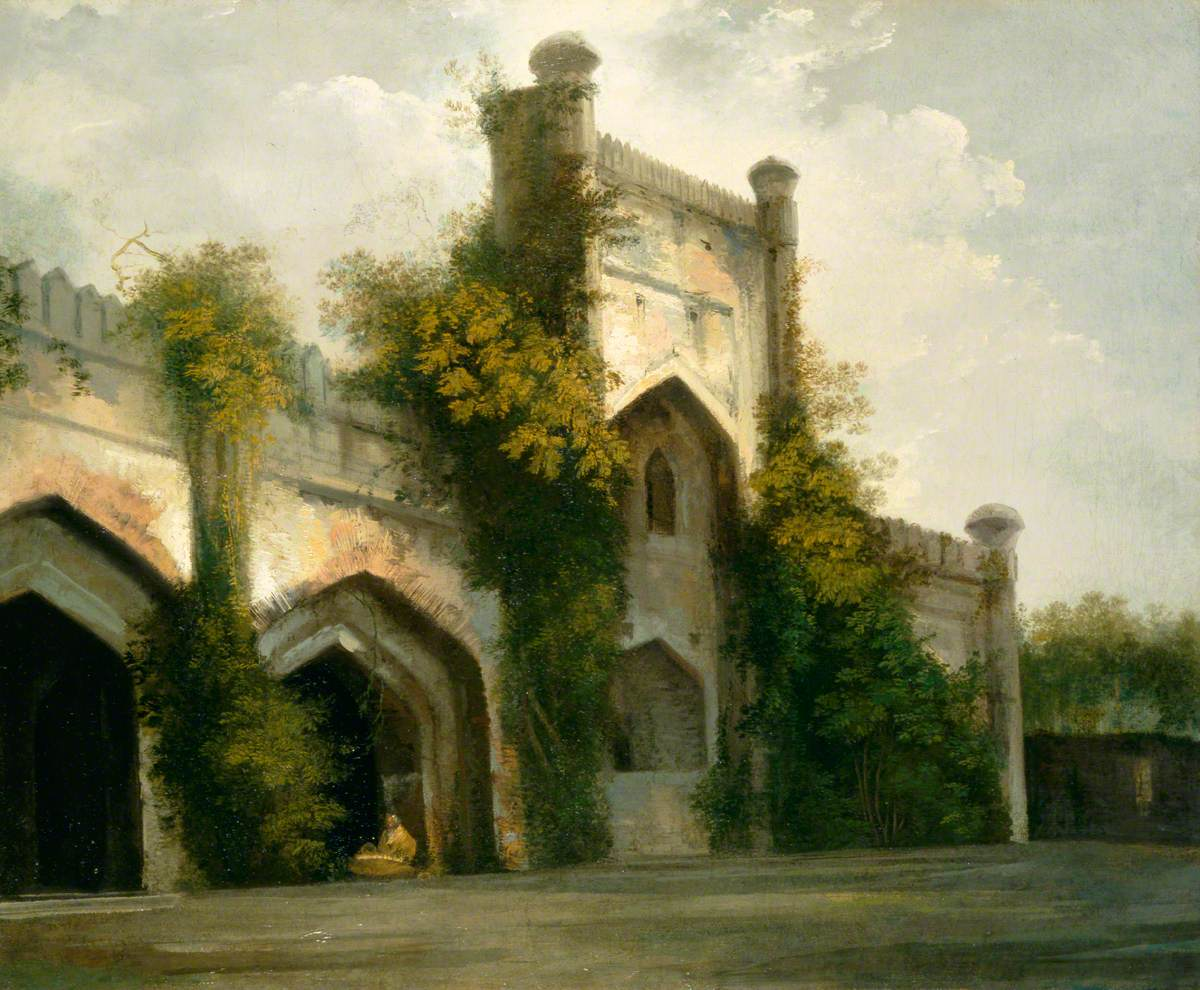
View of a Mosque at Raj Mahal by William Hodges

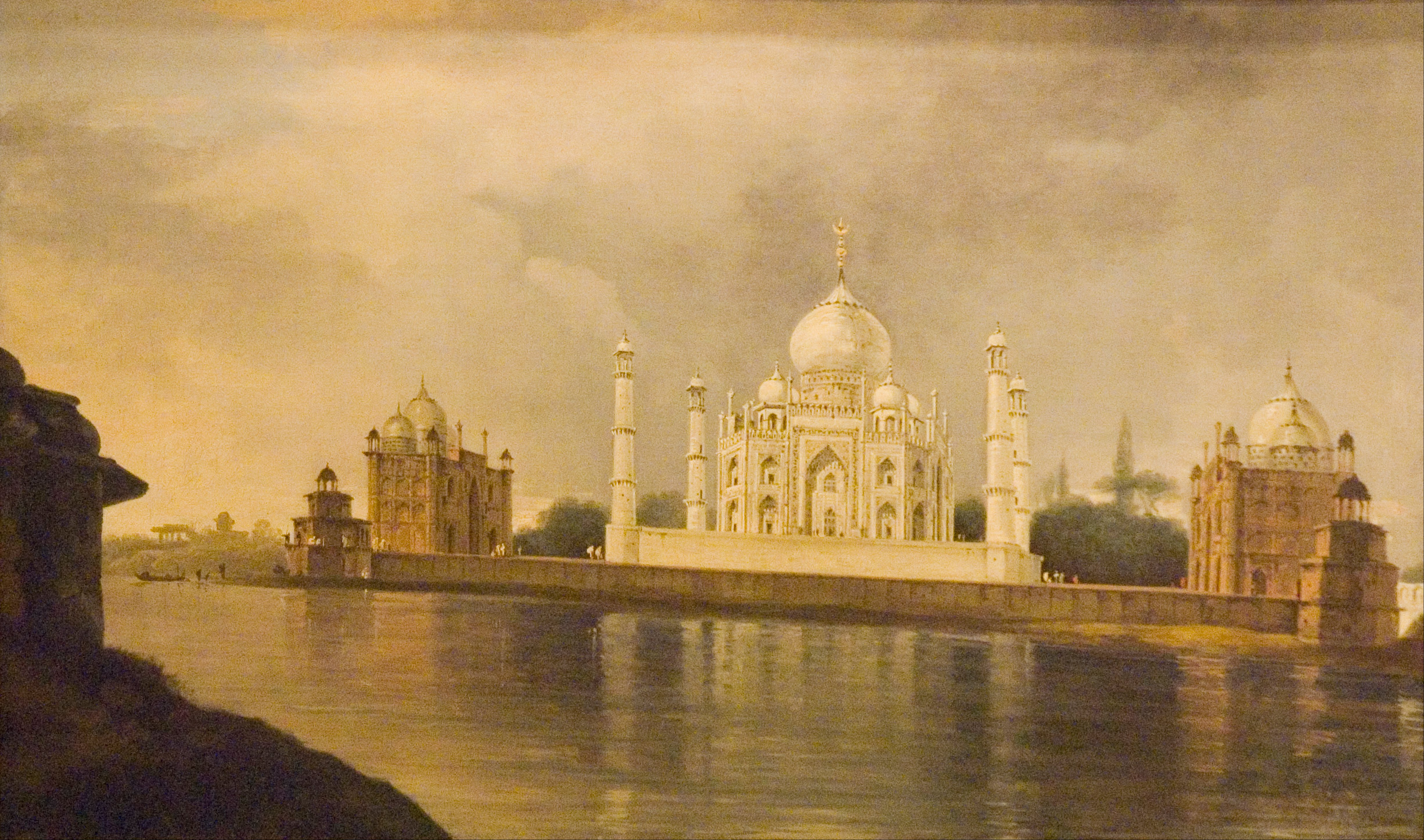
The Taj Mahal by William Hodges

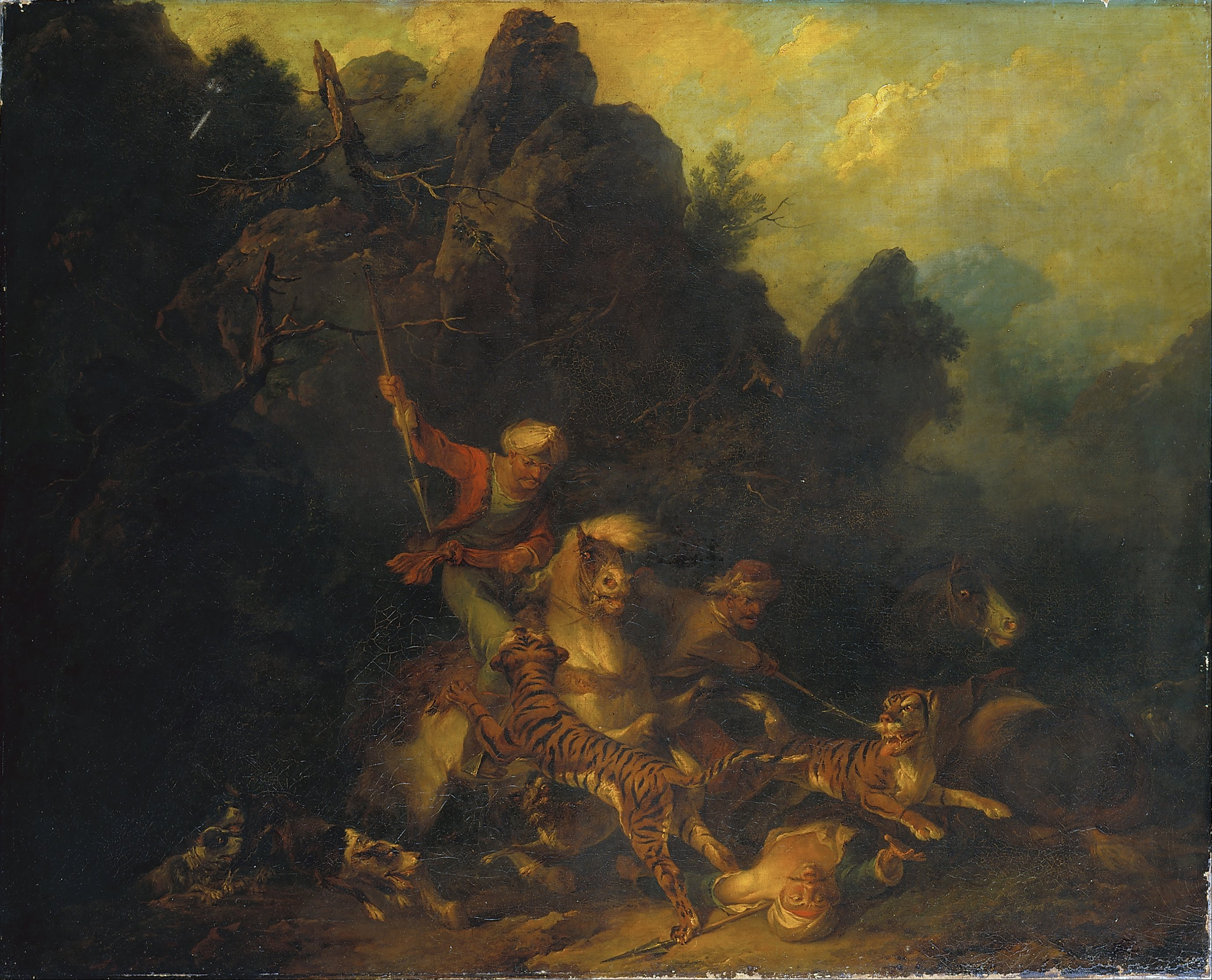
The Tiger Hunt by Francis Bourgeois

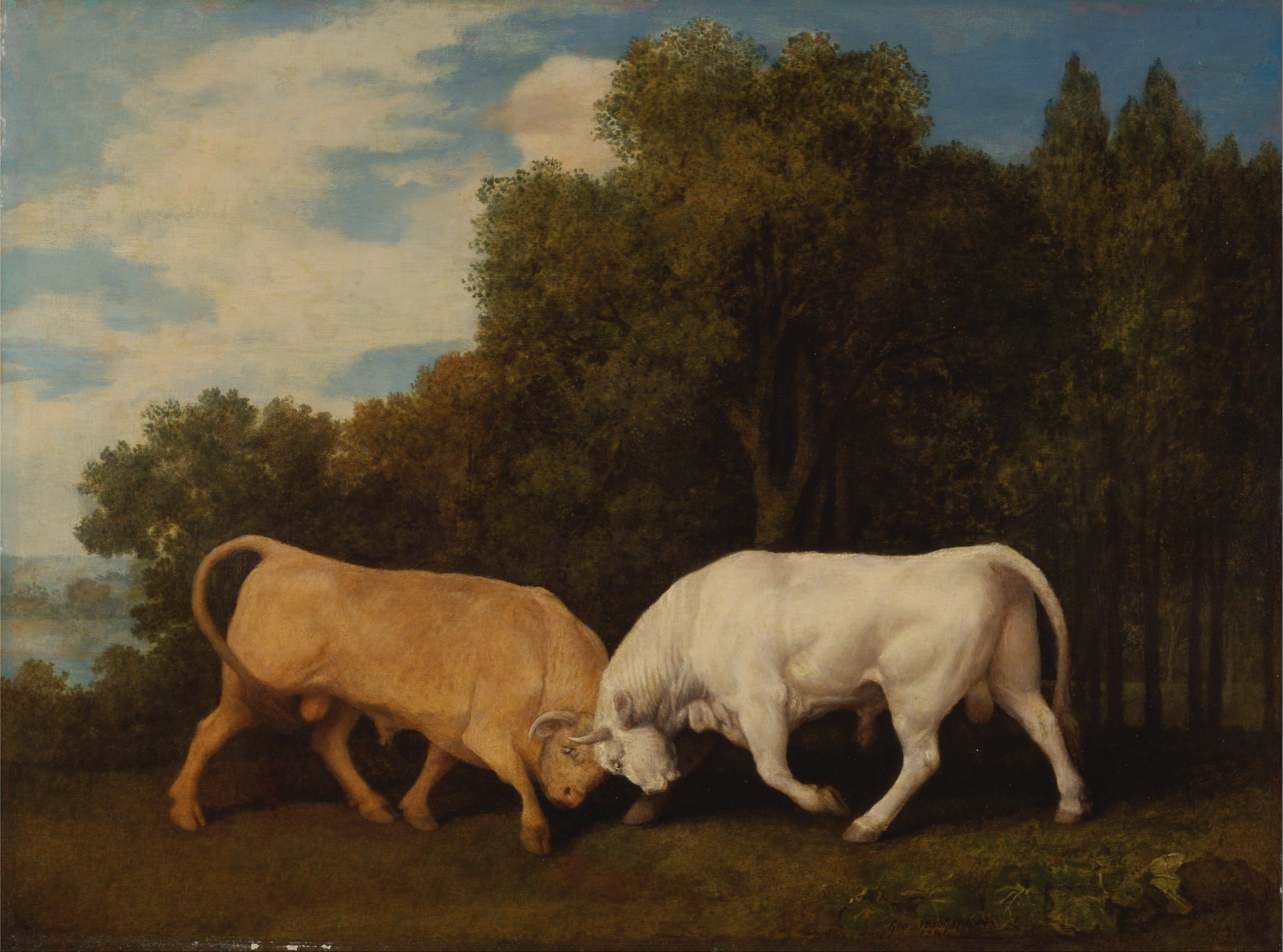
Bulls Fighting by George Stubbs

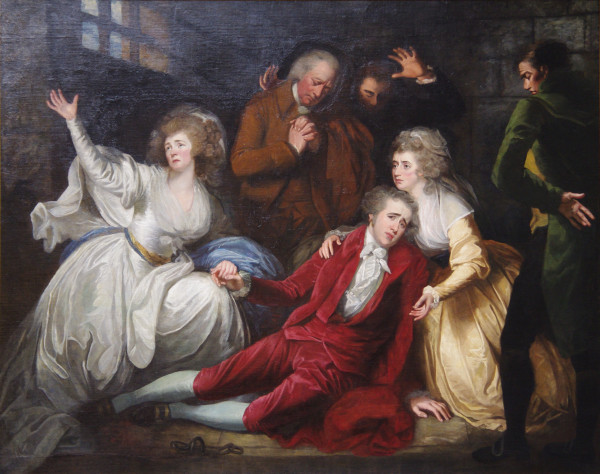
The Gamester by Mather Brown

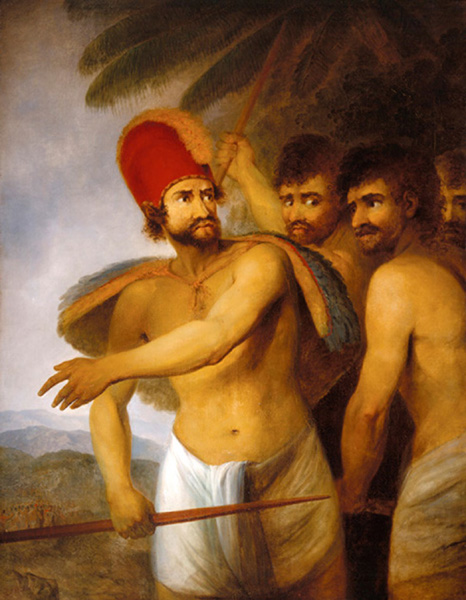
A Chief of the Sandwich Islands by John Webber

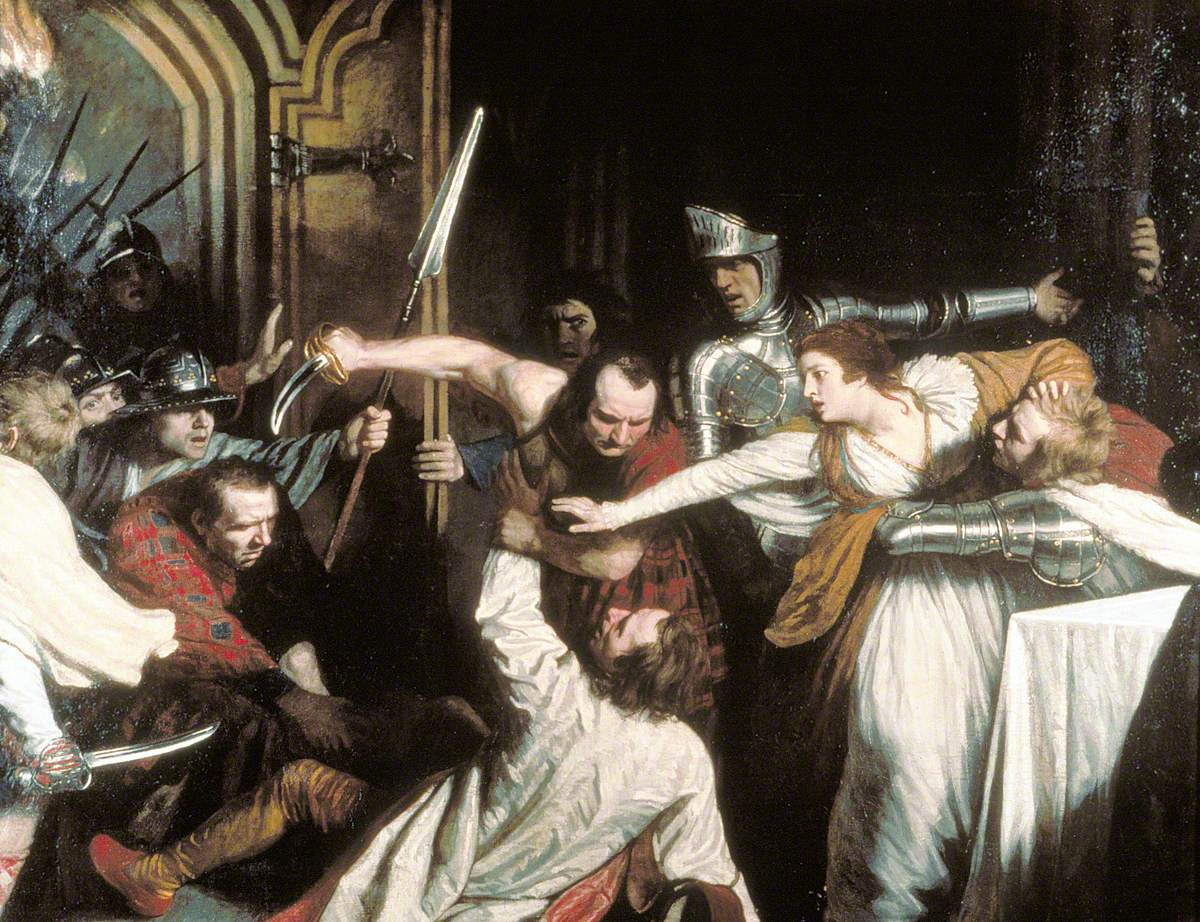
The Murder of Rizzio by John Opie

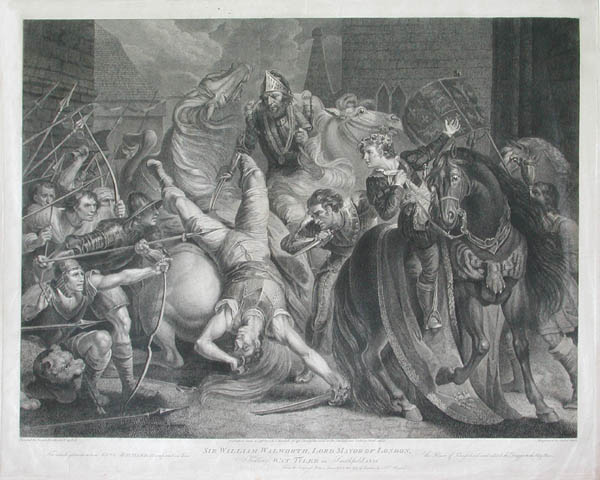
The Death of Water Tyler, an engraving based on James Northcote's work

Mad Girl by Thomas Lawrence

== Bibliography ==
- Egerton, Judy. George Stubbs, Painter. Yale University Press, 2007.
- Levey, Michael. Sir Thomas Lawrence. Yale University Press, 2005.
- McIntyre, Ian. Joshua Reynolds: The Life and Times of the First President of the Royal Academy. Allen Lane, 2003.
- Wright, Amina. Thomas Lawrence: Coming of Age. Bloomsbury Publishing, 2020.
