= Portrait of James Boswell =

Painting by Joshua Reynolds

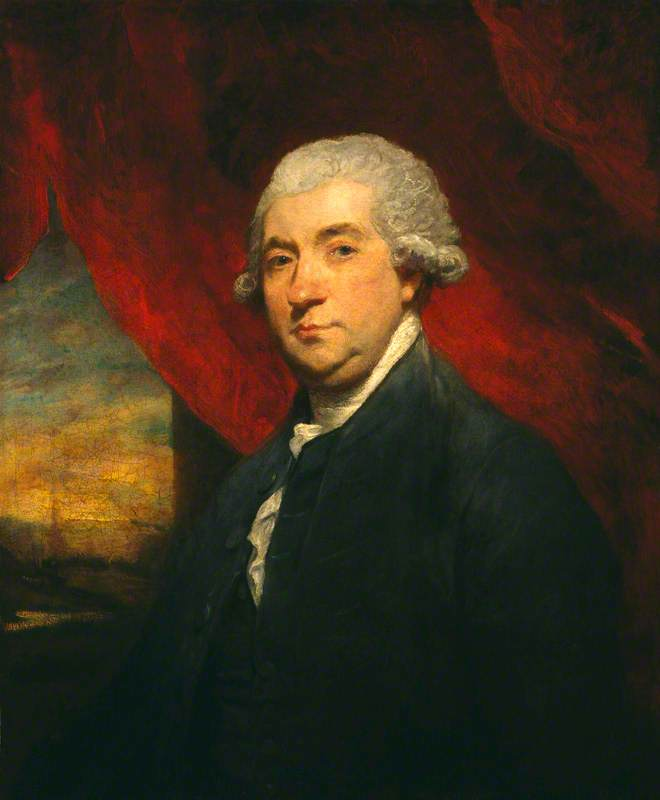
- Artist: Joshua Reynolds
- Year: 1785
- Type: Oil on canvas, portrait painting
- Dimensions: 76.2 cm × 63.5 cm (30.0 in × 25.0 in)
- Location: National Portrait Gallery, London

Portrait of James Boswell is a 1785 portrait painting by the English artist Joshua Reynolds depicting the Scottish author James Boswell. At the time Reynolds was President of the Royal Academy and Britain's leading portraitist, although he faced competition from Thomas Gainsborough and George Romney. Boswell subsequently became best known for writing the Life of Samuel Johnson, a biography of his friend the celebrated writer Samuel Johnson. Both Reynolds and Boswell were members of The Club, a London dining society that included leading figures of Georgian Britain. Boswell had a number of sittings over the course of the summer, the last of which took place after they had breakfasted together.

The work was displayed at the Royal Academy's Summer Exhibition of 1787 at Somerset House. Today the painting is in the collection of the National Portrait Gallery in London, having been acquired in 1964.

== See also ==
- Blinking Sam, a 1775 portrait by Reynolds of Samuel Johnson

== Bibliography ==
- Ingamells, John. National Portrait Gallery Mid-Georgian Portraits, 1760-1790. National Portrait Gallery, 2004.
- McIntyre, Ian. Joshua Reynolds: The Life and Times of the First President of the Royal Academy. Allen Lane, 2003.
- Radner, John B. Johnson and Boswell: A Biography of Friendship. Yale University Press, 2013.
