= Dorothea Jordan as Hippolyta =

Painting by John Hoppner

Dorothea Jordan as Hypolita
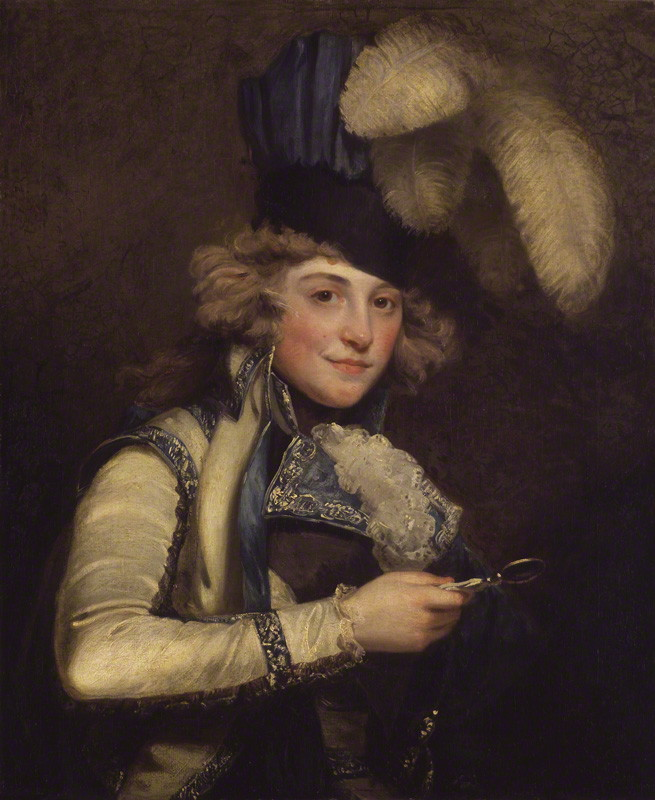
- Artist: John Hoppner
- Year: 1791
- Type: Oil on canvas, portrait painting
- Dimensions: 74.9 cm × 62.2 cm (29.5 in × 24.5 in)
- Location: National Portrait Gallery, London

Dorothea Jordan as Hypolita is an oil on canvas portrait painting by the British artist John Hoppner, from 1791. It depicts the Irish actress Dorothea Jordan in one of her better known roles as Hypolita in the play She Would and She Would Not by Colley Cibber. She is shown in one of her famous breeches roles when Hypolita assumes male disguise.

Dorothea Jordan was one of the most celebrated comedy actresses of the London stage of the late Georgian and early Regency era. She is also known for her longstanding relationship with the future William IV who she had several children with. Today it is in the collection of the National Portrait Gallery in London, having been acquired through a 1979 bequest.

== See also ==
- Dorothea Jordan as Rosalind, a 1787 painting by William Beechey featuring Jordan in one of her other famous roles

== Bibliography ==
- Perry, Gillian. Spectacular Flirtations: Viewing the Actress in British Art and Theatre, 1768-1820. Yale University Press, 2007.
- Redgrave, Richard & Redgrave, Samuel. A Century of British Painters. Cornell University Press, 1981.
- Tomalin, Claire. Mrs Jordan's Profession: The Story of a Great Actress and a Future King. Penguin UK, 2003.
