= A View of Cape Stephens in Cook's Straits with Waterspout =

Painting by William Hodges

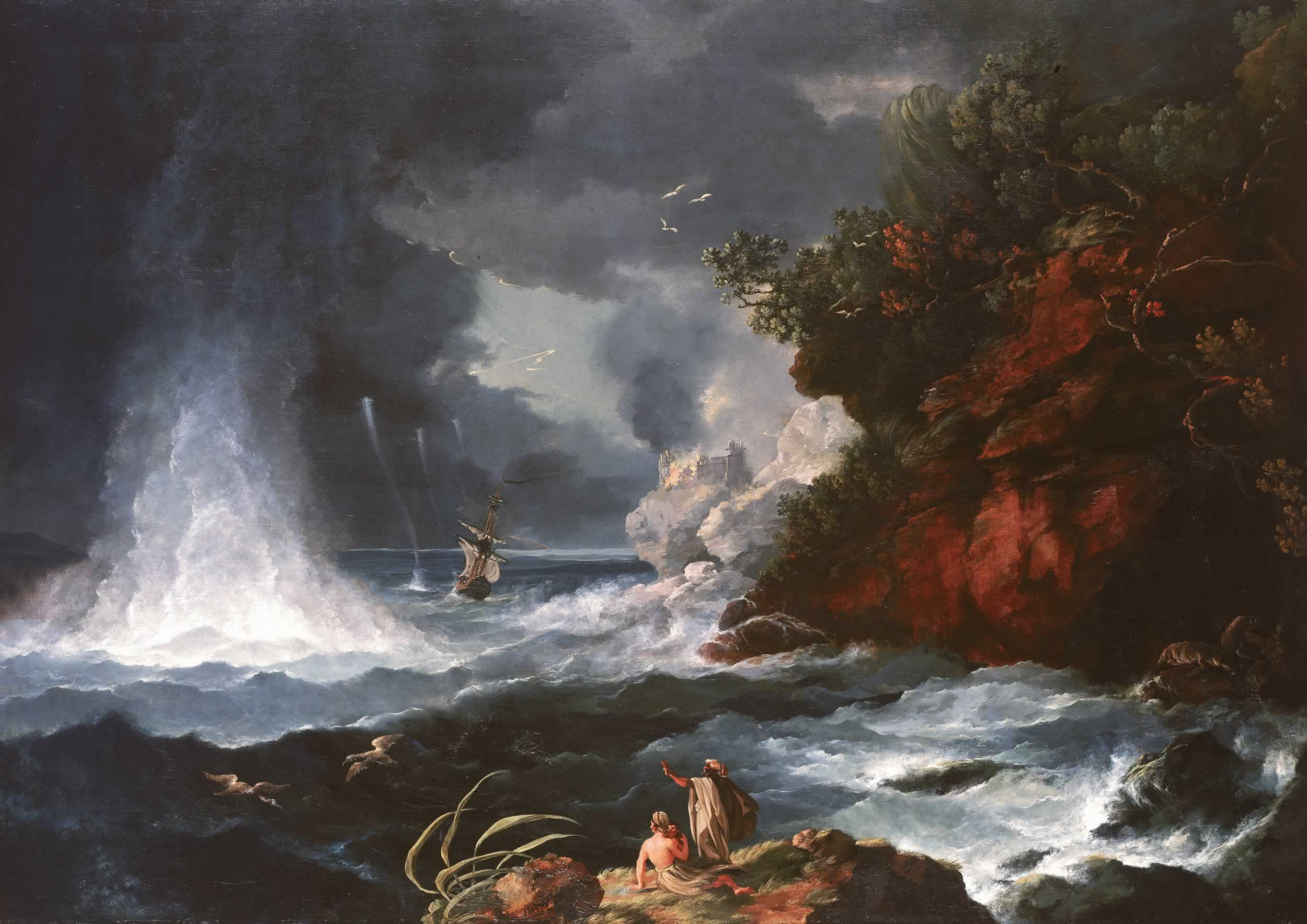
- Artist: William Hodges
- Year: 1776
- Type: Oil on canvas, landscape painting
- Dimensions: 135.9 cm × 193 cm (53.5 in × 76 in)
- Location: National Maritime Museum; Greenwich

A View of Cape Stephens in Cook's Straits with Waterspout is an oil painting by the British artist William Hodges, from 1776. A seascape, it depicts a view of James Cook's ship HMS Resolution encountering stormy weather and a waterspout off a rocky coast in the Cook Strait of New Zealand.

== History and description ==
Hodges accompanied the Second voyage of James Cook for a commission to record the trip for the British Admiralty. A major goal of the expedition was to try and locate the theoretical large Southern Continent that was though to exist. On his return to Britain Hodges worked up many of his drawings and sketches into oil paintings which were displayed at the Royal Academy' Summer Exhibitions at Somerset House. Today the painting is in the collection of the National Maritime Museum in Greenwich.

== Bibliography ==
- McAleer, John & Rigby, Nigel. Captain Cook and the Pacific: Art, Exploration & Empire. Yale University Press, 2017.
- Taylor, James. Picturing the Pacific: Joseph Banks and the Shipboard Artists of Cook and Flinders. Bloomsbury Publishing, 2018.
