= Thomas Engleheart =

English sculptor and modeller in wax

Thomas Engleheart (1745–1809), was an English sculptor and modeller in wax.

== Life ==
Engleheart was one of the sons of Francis Engleheart of Kew, and elder brother of George Engleheart, miniature Painter to George III. He was a student at the Royal Academy, and in 1772 competed with John Flaxman for the gold medal given by the Royal Academy for a bas-relief of "Ulysses and Nausicaa". In this competition Engleheart was successful, to the bitter disappointment of Flaxman. In 1777 the Society of Arts awarded him a prize for a six-foot tall model depicting John the Baptist in the desert. He exhibited various busts and models in wax at the Royal Academy from 1773 to 1786. Engleheart was described in a 1902 biography of his brother George as "a very religious man of enthusiastic Evangelical opinions." He died in 1809.

There are wax portraits of George III and Queen Charlotte by Engleheart in the Royal Collection; an oval medallion of Edward, Duke of Kent, modelled in red wax in 1786 is in the collection of the National Portrait Gallery in London.

== Sources ==
This article incorporates text from a publication now in the public domain: "Engleheart, Thomas". Dictionary of National Biography. London: Smith, Elder & Co. 1885–1900.
