= The Murder of Rizzio =

1787 painting by John Opie

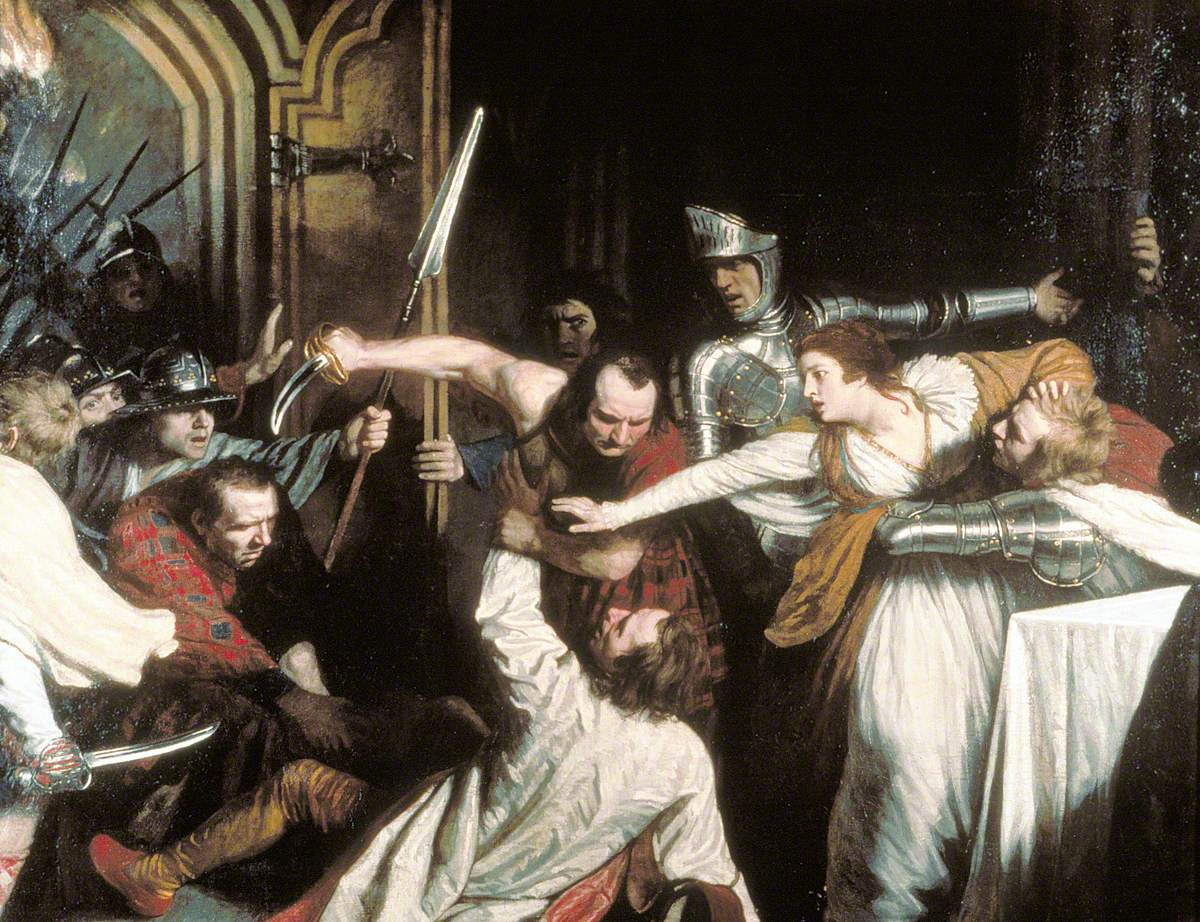
- Artist: John Opie
- Year: 1787
- Type: Oil on canvas, history painting
- Dimensions: 239 cm × 287 cm (94 in × 113 in)
- Location: Guildhall Art Gallery; London

The Murder of Rizzio is an oil on canvas history painting by the British painter John Opie, from 1787. It depicts a scene from Scottish history. On 9 March 1566 the Italian courtier David Rizzio was assassinated by rivals who feared his influence over Mary, Queen of Scots.

Opie was a painter hailed as the "Cornish wonder" known in particular for his portrait paintings. The work was displayed at the Royal Academy Exhibition of 1787 at Somerset House. Today the painting is in the Guildhall Art Gallery in the City of London, having been presented by John Boydell in 1793.

== Bibliography ==
- Levey, Michael. Sir Thomas Lawrence. Yale University Press, 2005.
- Myrone, Martin. Bodybuilding: Reforming Masculinities in British Art 1750-1810. Yale University Press, 2005.
