= Snowdon from Capel Curig =

Painting by Philip James de Loutherbourg

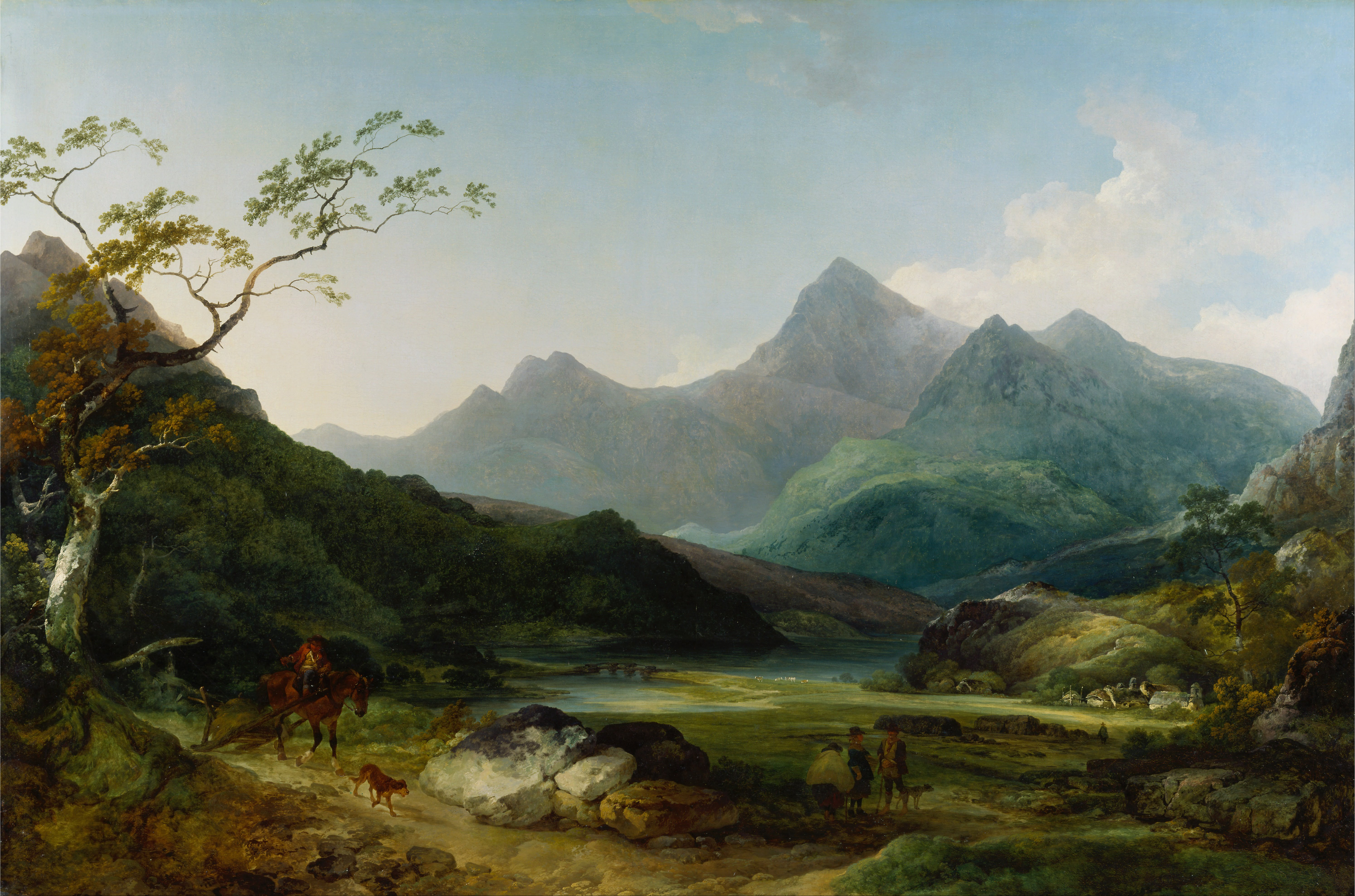
- Artist: Philip James de Loutherbourg
- Year: 1787
- Type: Oil on canvas, landscape painting
- Dimensions: 134.3 cm × 200.7 cm (52.9 in × 79.0 in)
- Location: Yale Center for British Art, New Haven

Snowdon from Capel Curig is an oil on canvas landscape painting by the French-British artist Philip James de Loutherbourg, from 1787. It depicts Snowdon, a mountain in North Wales. It is viewed from the near the village of Capel Curig which can be seen on the right foreground of the painting.

The mountain was a popular tourist destination in the eighteenth century. It was one of three views of Snowdon that Loutherbourg displayed at the Royal Academy's Summer Exhibition of 1787 at Somerset House in London. Today the painting is in the Yale Center for British Art, in New Haven, as part of the Paul Mellon Collection.

== Bibliography ==
- Freeman, Michael. Victorians and the Prehistoric: Tracks to a Lost World. Yale University Press, 2004.
- Preston, Lillian Elvira. Philippe Jacques de Loutherbourg: Eighteenth Century Romantic Artist and Scene Designer. University of Florida, 1977.
