= Dorothea Jordan as Rosalind =

Painting by William Beechey

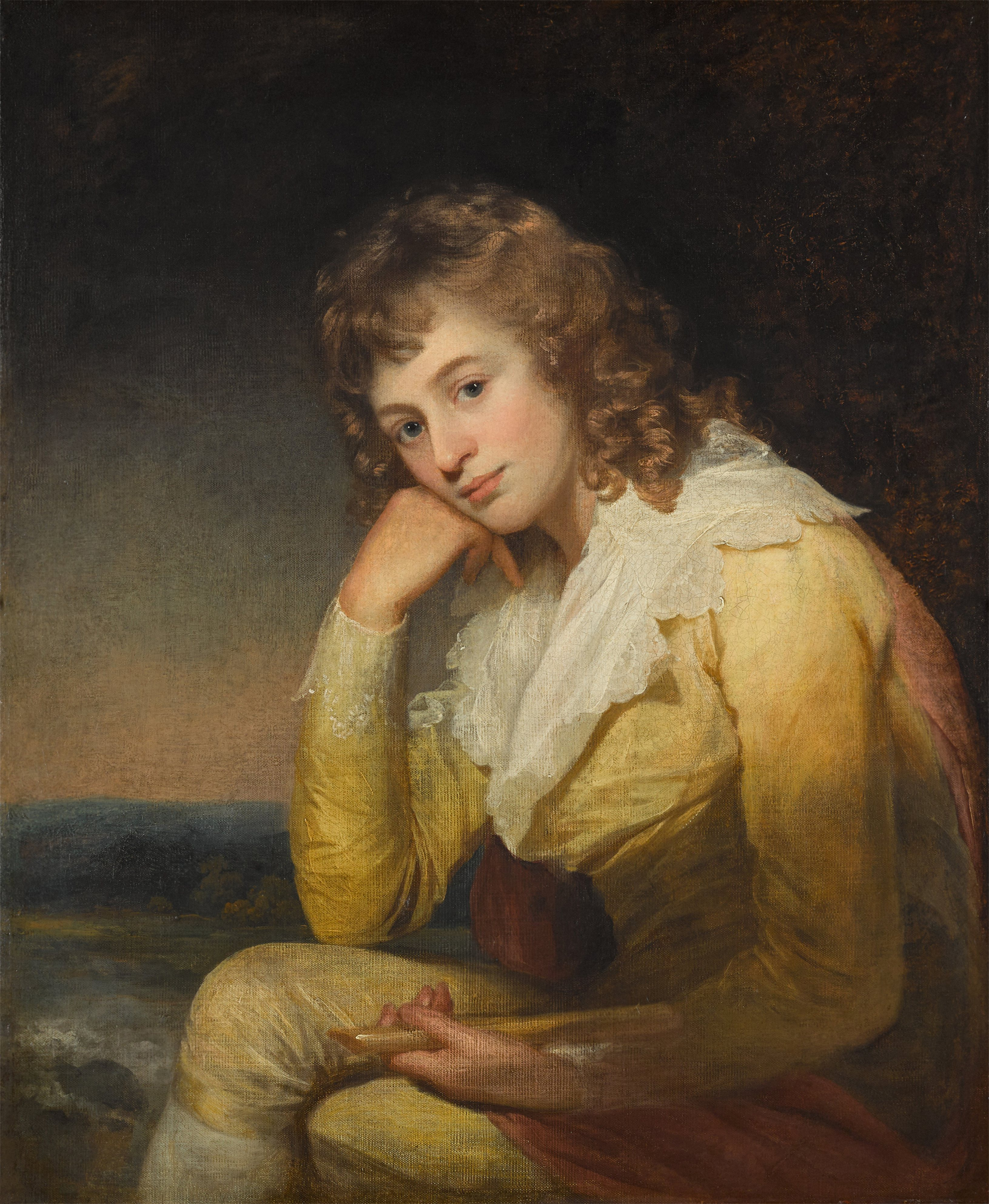
- Artist: William Beechey
- Year: 1787
- Type: Oil on canvas, portrait
- Dimensions: 77.5 cm × 63.5 cm (30.5 in × 25.0 in)
- Location: Private Collection

Dorothea Jordan as Rosalind is an oil on canvas portrait painting by the English artist William Beechey of the Irish actress Dorothea Jordan. It was created in 1787.

Jordan was a leading actress on the London stage, appearing for many years at the Theatre Royal, Drury Lane. She was also the long-standing lover of the Duke of Clarence, a future monarch, with whom she had several children. She is portrayed in one of her best-known parts, the role of Rosalind from Shakespeare's As You Like It, in a breeches role when she is disguised as a boy. Jordan's biographer Claire Tomalin considers it "the most beautiful of all the portraits of her".

== See also ==
- Dorothea Jordan as Hippolyta, 1791 painting by John Hoppner

== Bibliography ==
- Perry, Gillian. Spectacular Flirtations: Viewing the Actress in British Art and Theatre, 1768-1820. Yale University Press, 2007.
- Thirlwell, Angela. Rosalind: A Biography of Shakespeare’s Immortal Heroine. Bloomsbury Publishing, 2016.
- Tomalin, Claire. Mrs Jordan's Profession: The Story of a Great Actress and a Future King. Penguin UK, 2003.
