= The Ghauts at Benares =

Painting by William Hodges

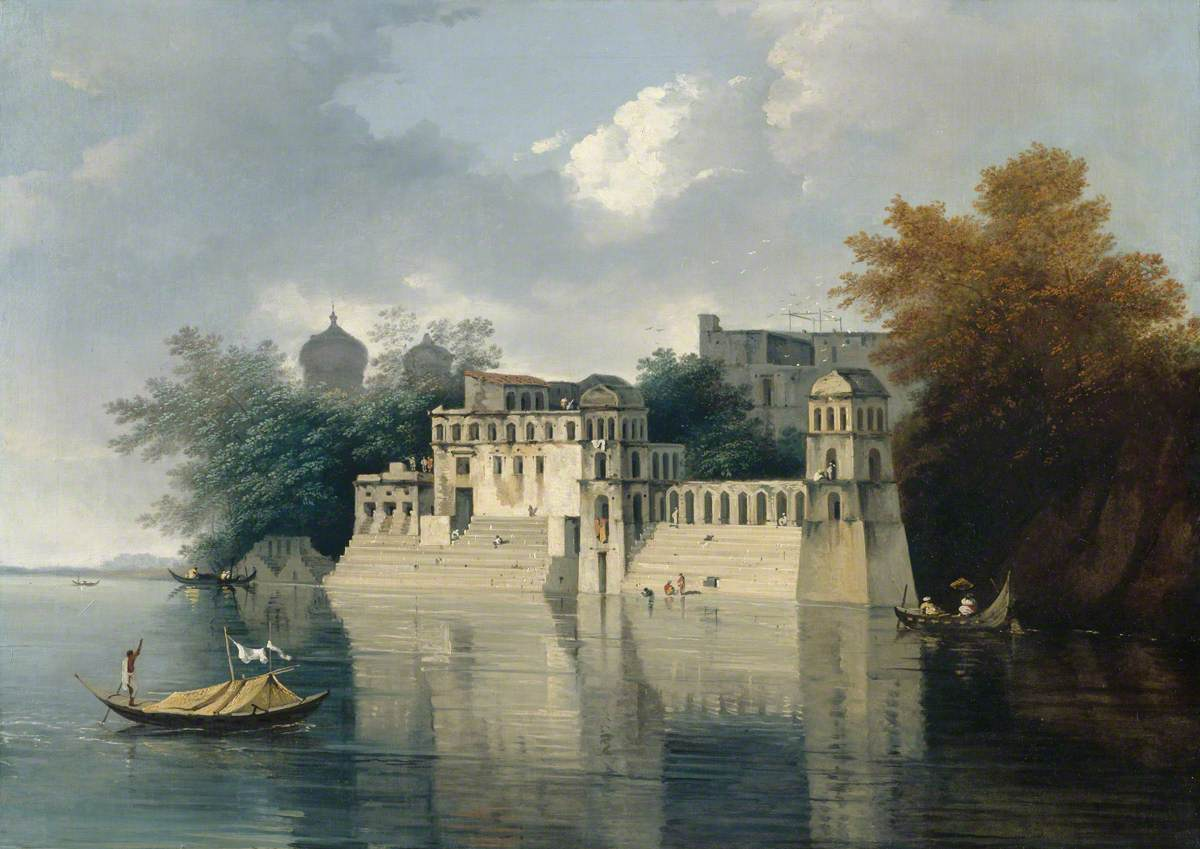
- Artist: William Hodges
- Year: 1787
- Type: Oil on canvas, landscape painting
- Dimensions: 91.5 cm × 130.8 cm (36.0 in × 51.5 in)
- Location: Royal Academy of Arts, London

The Ghauts at Benares is a 1787 landscape painting by the British artist William Hodges. It depicts the ceremonial ghats on the River Ganges at Benares (now known as Varanasi) in Northern India. Having made his name by accompanying the second voyage of James Cook to the Pacific Ocean, Hodges subsequently became the first British landscape artist to visit India between 1780 and 1783. He accompanied the Governor-General Warren Hastings to Benares in 1781, although the painting was produced on his return to England based on sketches he made there. The painting was displayed at the Royal Academy Exhibition of 1787 at Somerset House in London. When Hodges was elected a member of the Royal Academy the same year he presented this as his diploma work.

== Bibliography ==
- Quilley, Geoff & Bonehill, Jane (ed.) William Hodges 1744-1797: The Art of Exploration. Yale University Press, 2004.
- Tillotson, Giles Henry Rupert. The Artificial Empire: The Indian Landscapes of William Hodges. Psychology Press, 2000.
