= William Hodges =

English painter (1744-1797)

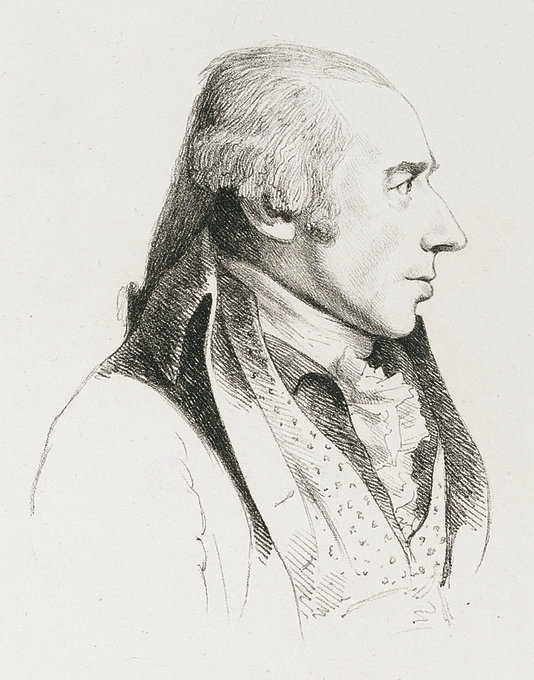
William Hodges, portrait by George Dance the Younger

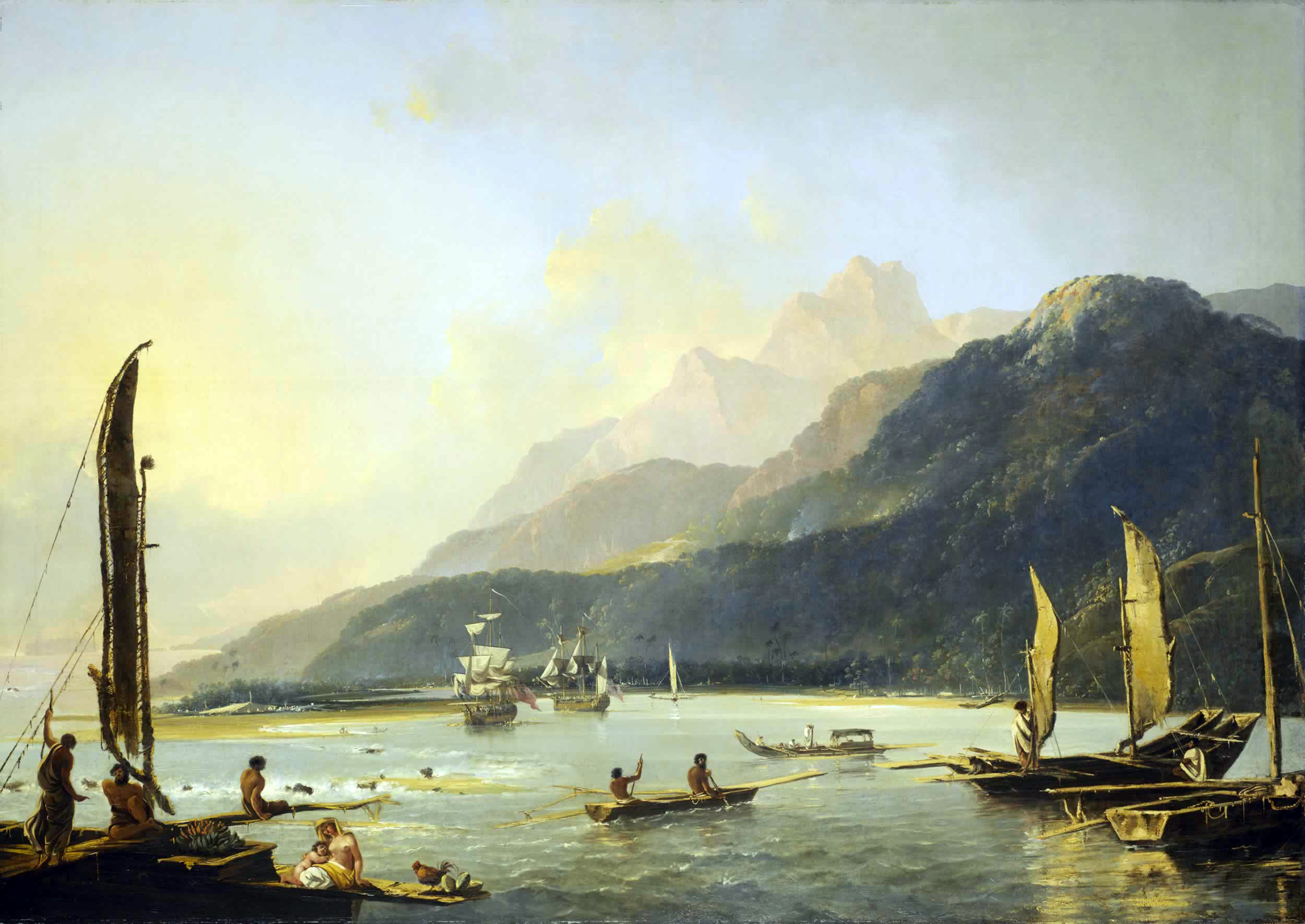
Hodges' painting of HMS Resolution and HMS Adventure in Matavai Bay, Tahiti

William Hodges RA (28 October 1744 – 6 March 1797) was an English painter. He was a member of James Cook's second voyage to the Pacific Ocean, and is best known for the sketches and paintings of locations he visited on that voyage, including Table Bay, Tahiti, Easter Island, New Zealand, Dusky Sound and the Antarctic.

== Biography ==
Hodges was born on 28 October 1744 in London. He studied under William Shipley and afterwards in the studio of Richard Wilson, where he met Thomas Jones.

During his early career, he made a living by painting theatrical scenery.

Between 1772 and 1775 Hodges accompanied James Cook to the Pacific as the expedition's artist. Some of his expedition paintings have a marked resemblance in terms of epic scope and sweep of the Hudson River School of Art. Many of his sketches and wash paintings were adapted as engravings in the original published edition of Cook's journals from the voyage.

Most of the large-scale landscape oil paintings from his Pacific travels for which Hodges is best known were finished after his return to London; he received a salary from the Admiralty for the purposes of completing them. These paintings depicted a stronger light and shadow than had been usual in European landscape tradition. Contemporary art critics complained that his use of light and colour contrasts gave his paintings a rough and unfinished appearance.

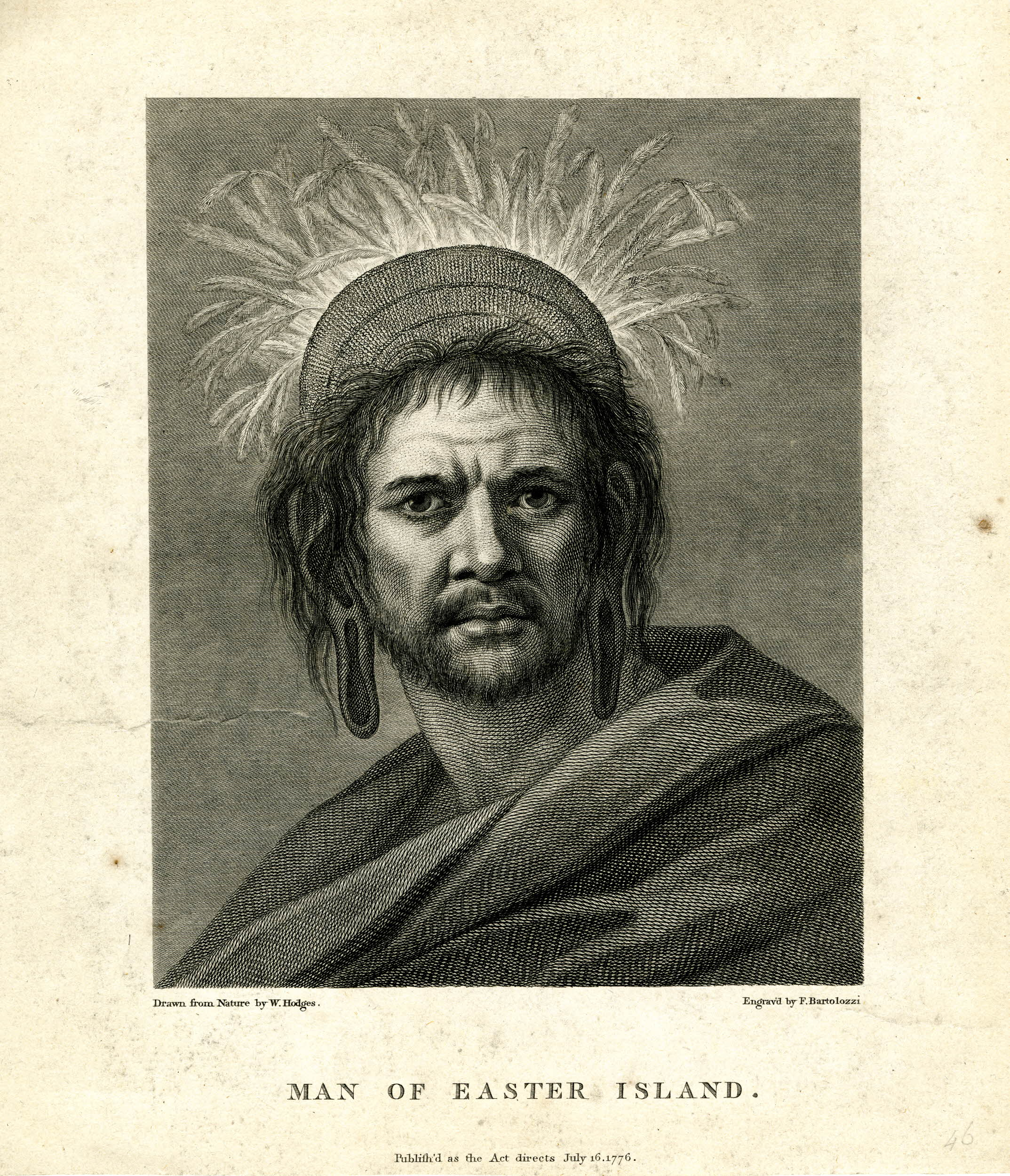
Man of Easter Island, 1776 (British Museum)

Hodges also produced many valuable portrait sketches of Pacific islanders and scenes from the voyage involving members of the expedition.

Under the patronage of Warren Hastings, Hodges travelled to India as one of the first British professional landscape painters to visit the country, touring between 1780 and 1783. In 1781, he accompanied Hastings to Benares (Varanasi), where he produced sketches of the city's riverbank architecture, culture, and bathing ghats; these sketches later formed the basis for his 1787 painting The Ghauts at Benares. He stayed in Lucknow with Claude Martin in 1783. His painting of "Futtypoor Sicri" is in Sir John Soane's Museum. In 1794 Hodges published an illustrated book about his travels in India.

Later Hodges travelled across Europe, including a visit to St. Petersburg in Russia in 1790.

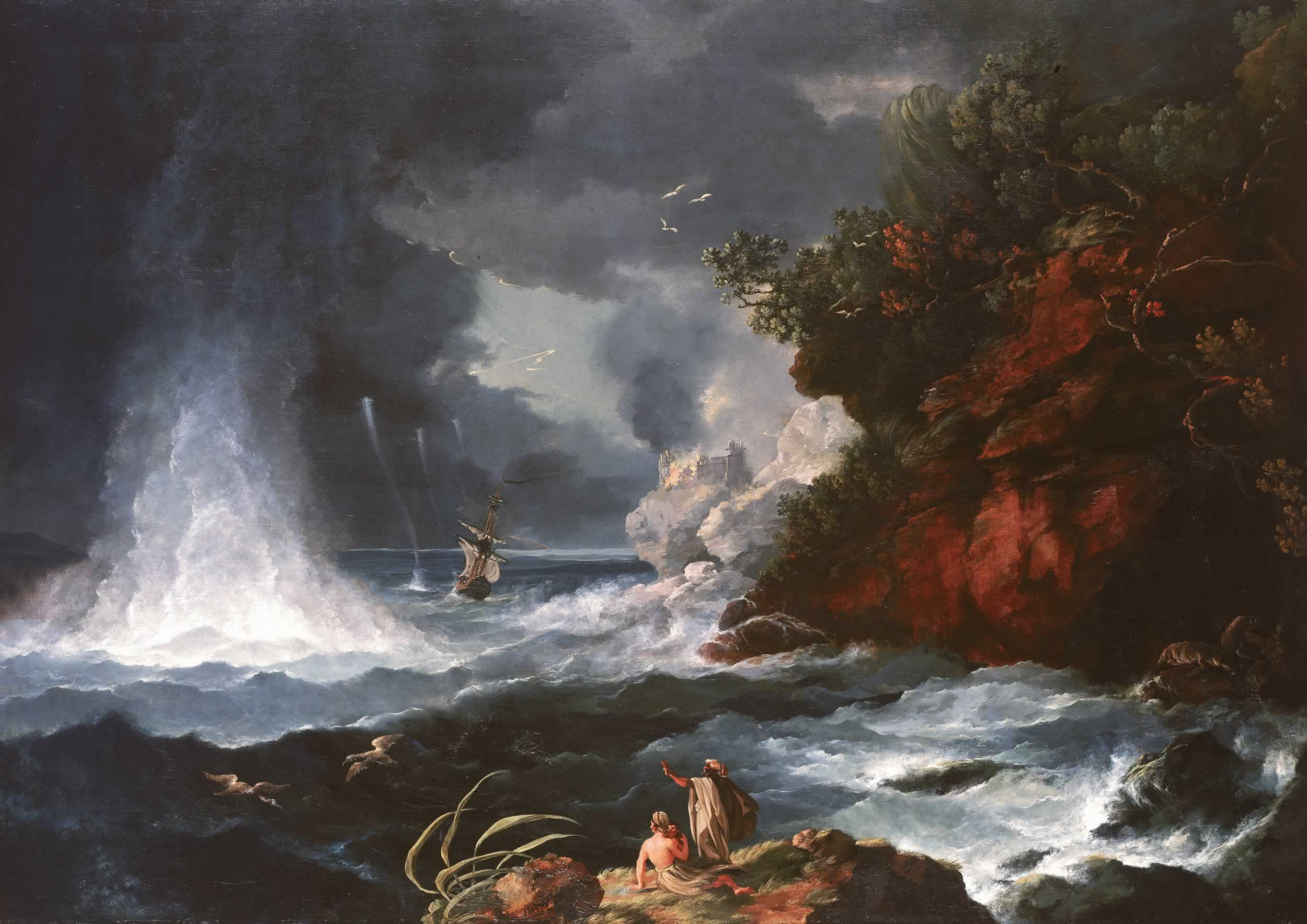
A View of Cape Stephens in Cook's Straits with Waterspout, 1776

In December 1794 Hodges opened an exhibition of twenty-five of his own works at Orme's Gallery, 14 Old Bond Street, London that included two large paintings called The Effects of Peace and The Effects of War. In late January 1795, with Britain engaged in the War of the First Coalition against Revolutionary France and feelings running high, the exhibition was visited by Prince Frederick, Duke of York and Albany, the second son of King George III. The Duke took offence at the political nature of Hodges' paintings and ordered the exhibition closed; this royal censure effectively ended Hodges' career as a painter. Many of his works were then sold by auction but produced only an inconsiderable sum.

Hodges retired to Devon and became involved with a bank, which failed during the banking crisis of March 1797. On 6 March of that year, he died from what was officially recorded as "gout in the stomach", but which was also rumoured to be suicide from an overdose of laudanum.

Hodges Knoll in Antarctica is named after William Hodges.

== Personal life ==
On 11 May 1776 Hodges married Martha Bowden Nesbit, the daughter of William and Jane Nesbit, at St George's, Hanover Square, London. The couple settled in Pimlico. They undertook a tour of Wales and the Midlands, during which they visited Derby, where Joseph Wright of Derby painted a portrait of Martha Hodges. Martha died within a year, possibly during childbirth. Having finished his work for the Admiralty, and with the death of his wife, Hodges was free to travel.

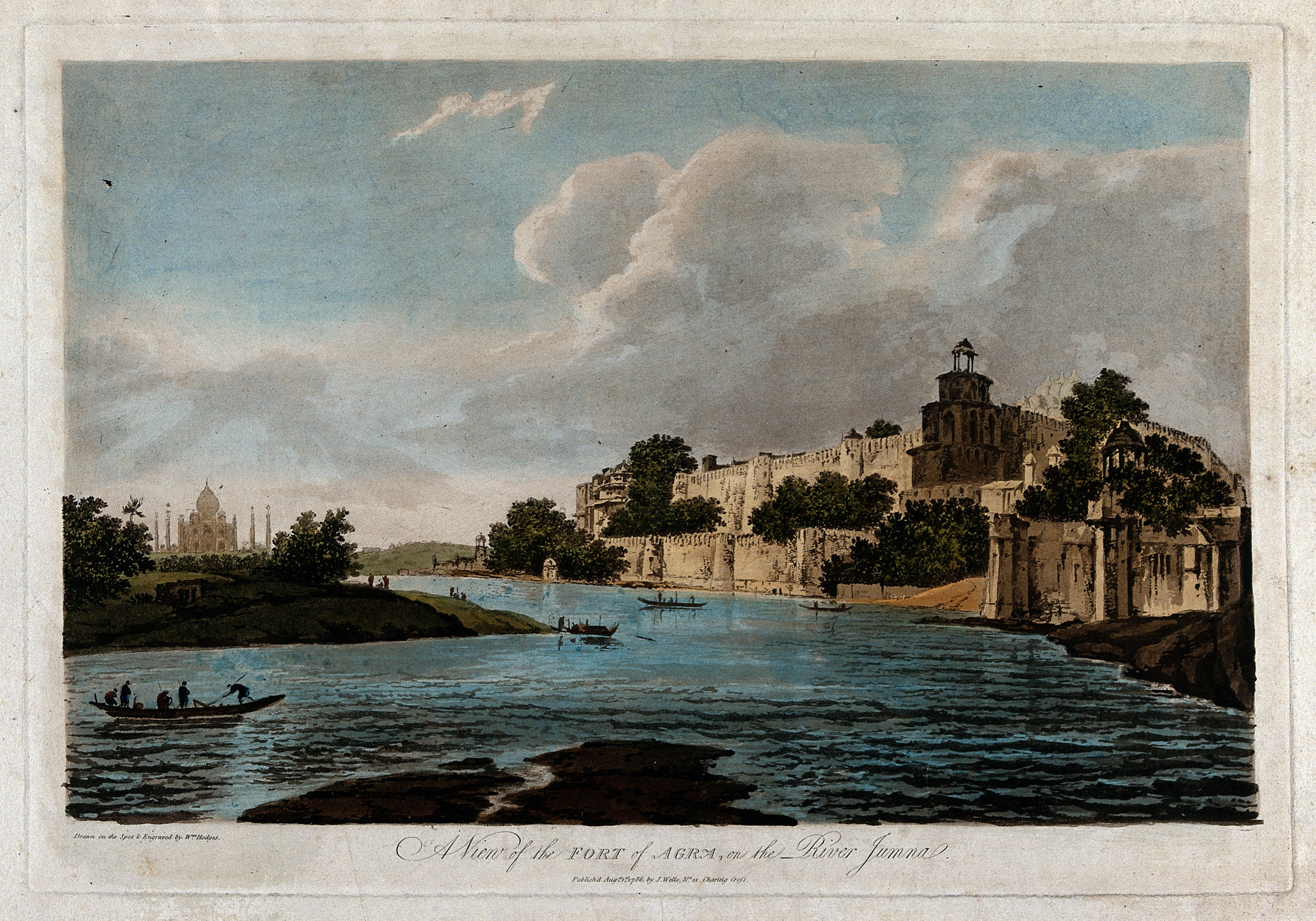
A view of the Fort of Agra in India, soft ground etching with aquatint, 1786

Hodges left India in November 1783, in Worcester. This ship was nearly wrecked at St Helena, but reached Britain in June 1784. Hodges is reputed to have returned a rich man, and settled in Queen Street, Mayfair, where he built himself a studio. He brought home with him a son, James. Hodges’ mother looked after her new grandson in a house in Tunbridge Wells, which Hodges purchased.

William Hodges began preparing a collection, "Select Views in India in the Years 1780–1783", that included a series of forty-eight aquatints adapted from sketches drawn in India. On 16 October 1784, again at St George's, Hanover Square, Hodges married his second wife, Lydia Wright. Lydia was the niece of John Whitehurst from Derby. Unfortunately, she too died after only a few months of marriage, possibly from alcoholism.

In December 1785, Hodges married for a third time. It was to Ann Mary Carr, a talented pianist, and the oldest of the five children of Benjamin and Elizabeth Carr. Her parents were already deceased when she married Hodges. At about the same time, Hodges was listed as the guardian of Ann Mary's brother, John, later a famous travel writer. They had two daughters and three sons together. Hodges was elected a member of the Royal Academy in 1789, and continued to exhibit there until 1794. After experiencing financial difficulties, he made an unsuccessful trip to seek patronage in Russia in 1792. On his return, in February, 1793, Hodges published his account of his time in India, entitled Travels in India in the Years 1780, 1781, 1782 and 1783, illustrated with plates derived from his drawings.

In December 1794, Hodges held a private exhibition of 25 of his pictures in old Bond Street, London. Remarkably, it received no subscription, and made no sales, forcing Hodges to close it by 26 January 1795.

Totally disillusioned, Hodges retired from his profession, sold his London property, and moved himself and his family, in July, 1795, to Brixham and Dartmouth in South Devon. There, he attempted to restore his fortunes by becoming a partner in a small bank at Dartmouth. His partner was Thomas Gretton, a lawyer. Also present in South Devon was Gretton's brother, the Reverend George Gretton. The Grettons were the nephews of John and Elizabeth Whitehurst of Derby, further evidence of the family connections with the town. The bank opened in Dartmouth on 24 August 1795, and the following is an extract from the Exeter Flying Post dated 1 October 1795:

The public are hereby informed that on this day Bank was opened at Dartmouth in the county of Devon under the firm of J. Seale, Hodges, Gretton and Ful where business will be transacted with the greatest punctuality. Dartmouth, 24th August, 1795.

Banknotes, dated 24 August 1795, exist, issued by Hodges and Thomas Gretton & Co., payable on demand in Dartmouth or at their London agents, Walwyn, Petrie, Ward and McGregor. The bank was soon known as the Dartmouth Bank and incorporated the Arms of Dartmouth on a shield on its notes. In October, 1795, new partners were added, probably to inject new capital into the bank. They were John Seale, a local landowner, and William Tult.

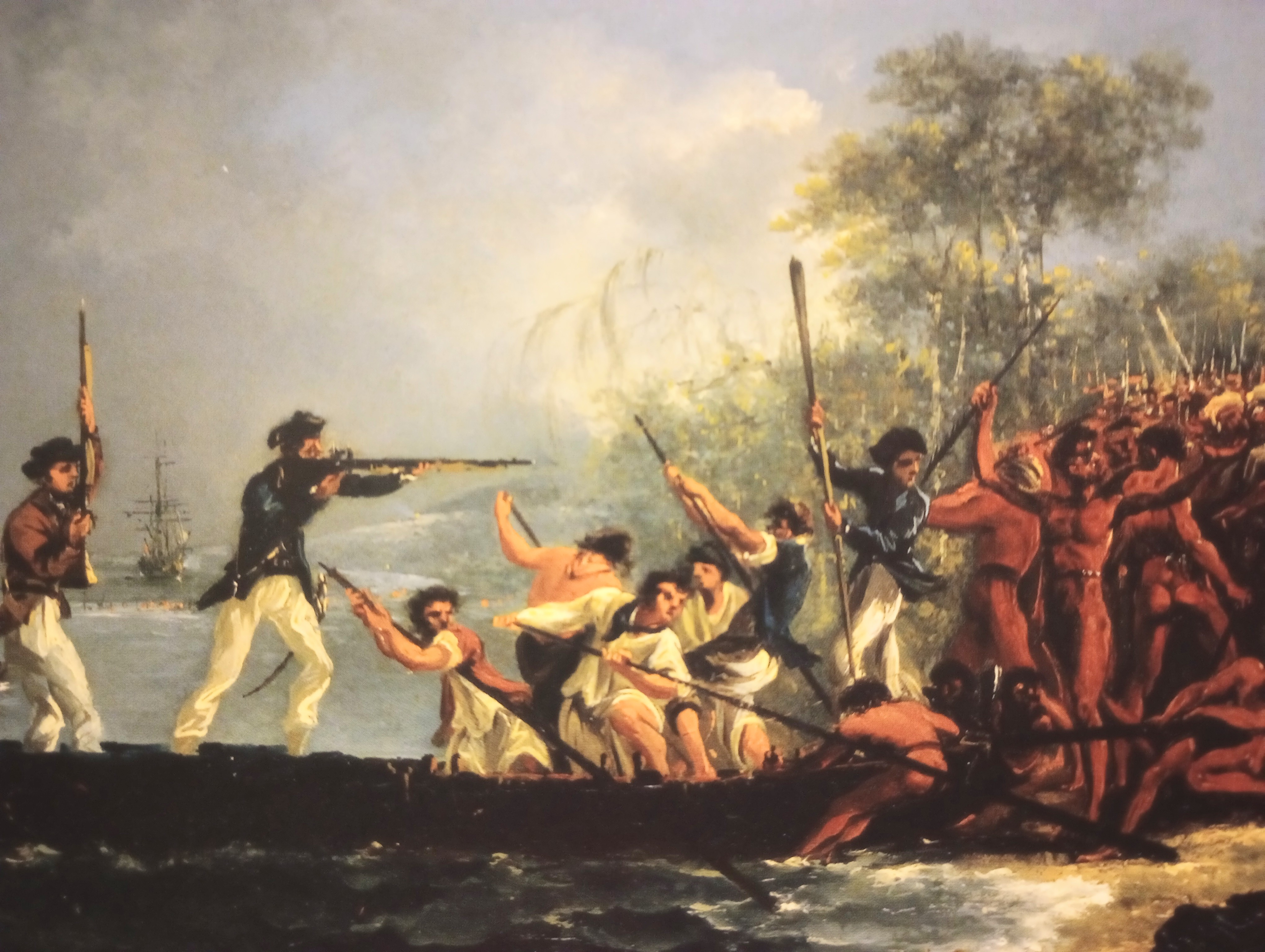
The Landing at Erramanga, one of the New Hebrides by William Hodges depicting James Cook firing at a group of Erromangans

John Seale was a very influential person in Dartmouth at the time, holding extensive property and land both in and around Dartmouth. Thomas Gretton was a practising attorney in the town. Not unlike many other banks of the period, there appear to have been problems from quite soon after the bank's inception. The ongoing war with France had severe effects on Dartmouth, and this, together with a stoppage of payments at the Bank of England, caused a run on the bank in March 1797. The Exeter Flying Post of 13 September 1798, has an official notice relating to Thomas Gretton's personal bankruptcy. John Seale, however, appears to have come out of this affair with his reputation unscathed as both he and his descendants remained very influential in the area throughout the 19th century.

Hodges died at 10.00am on Monday, 6 March 1797. The cause of death, as rumoured locally, was through an overdose of laudanum, which Hodges used as medication to treat his stomach gout. Whether the overdose was accidental or deliberate we shall probably never know for certain. However, we do know that he was under severe stress at the time caused by his own parlous financial situation and the impending collapse of the bank, both of which appeared intertwined. The Burial Register of St. Mary's Church, Brixham records William Hodges, burial 13 March 1797. No headstone has been found.

In spite of his financial problems, he nevertheless appeared to be liked and well respected, both locally and farther afield. As a young man, both Cook and Wales enjoyed his company during the three years that he spent on HMS Resolution on Cook's second epic voyage, and Cook greatly admired the young painter's sea and landscapes of the voyage. The Gentleman's Magazine reported of his death in 1797 as follows:

Of the gout in his stomach, William Hodges Esq. R. A. of Brixham, Devon; a man of varied and considerable knowledge in his art. If he did not rise to the summit of landscape painting, there were in general strength, correctness, and taste in his productions. His paintings and drawings of Asiatic scenery are deservedly admired. With a modesty that always characterizes worth and genius, he retired from the prosecution of his art, conceiving that his place would be filled by men of greater merit. He had, therefore, with the profit of his labours in the East, taken a share in a provincial bank, which, with his attention, his integrity, and the many friends his virtues and talents had procured him, would probably have proved a prosperous undertaking. His personal manners were easy, affable and communicative; and all he said was marked by good sense, truth and simplicity. He has left to regret his loss a numerous train of friends and a widow, who is one of the most amicable and accomplished women in the kingdom, though the delicacy of her mind has chiefly confined the reputation of her merit and abilities within the sphere of domestic intercourse and enjoyment.

Hodges left his wife and children in great want. However, many of his friends soon rallied around to try and ease their burden, and for this, and other information relating to events soon after his death, we have the "Farrington Diaries", written daily as events unfolded. Joseph Farrington RA (1747–1821) studied as a pupil under Richard Wilson R.A. at the same time as Hodges and later both became fellow Royal Academicians. They appear to have remained lifelong friends.

An entry relating to the disposal of some of Hodges' personal possessions was written some years later on 3 October 1809, when Farrington was journeying through the West Country and visited Brixham:

___ told us that after his death there was a sale at his house and that many articles, particularly valuable books, were sold for almost nothing. But that she understood that the most valuable part of his drafts (drawings) as she called them were reserved by Mr. Carr (Sir John), and that though some were sold they were those of the least value.

Sir John Carr (1772–1832) was a native of Totnes (approximately eight miles from Brixham ) who for health reasons frequently travelled abroad and wrote books on his travels.

As Hodges was employed by the Admiralty on Cook's second voyage, all paintings and drawings of the voyage belonged to them. However, he repeated some of them.

== Gallery ==
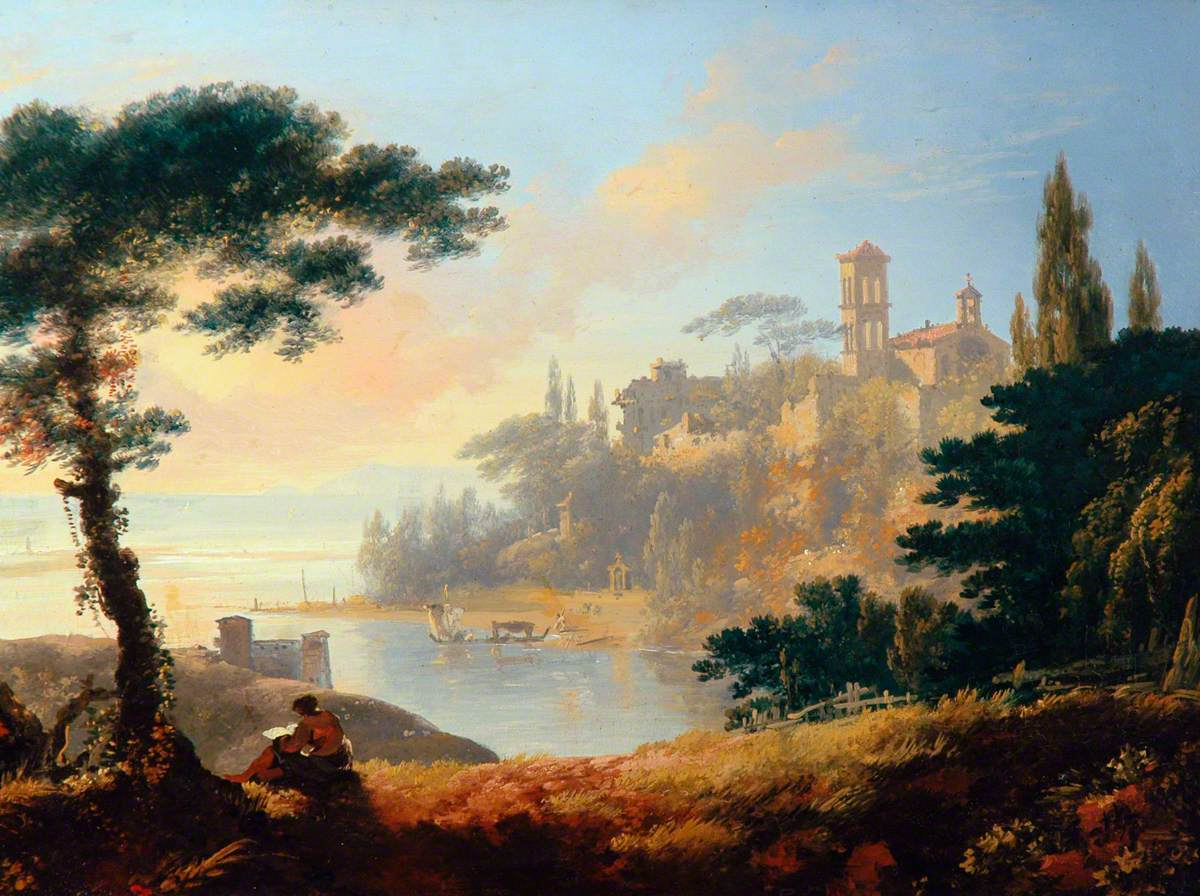
A View of the Island of Madeira, 1777

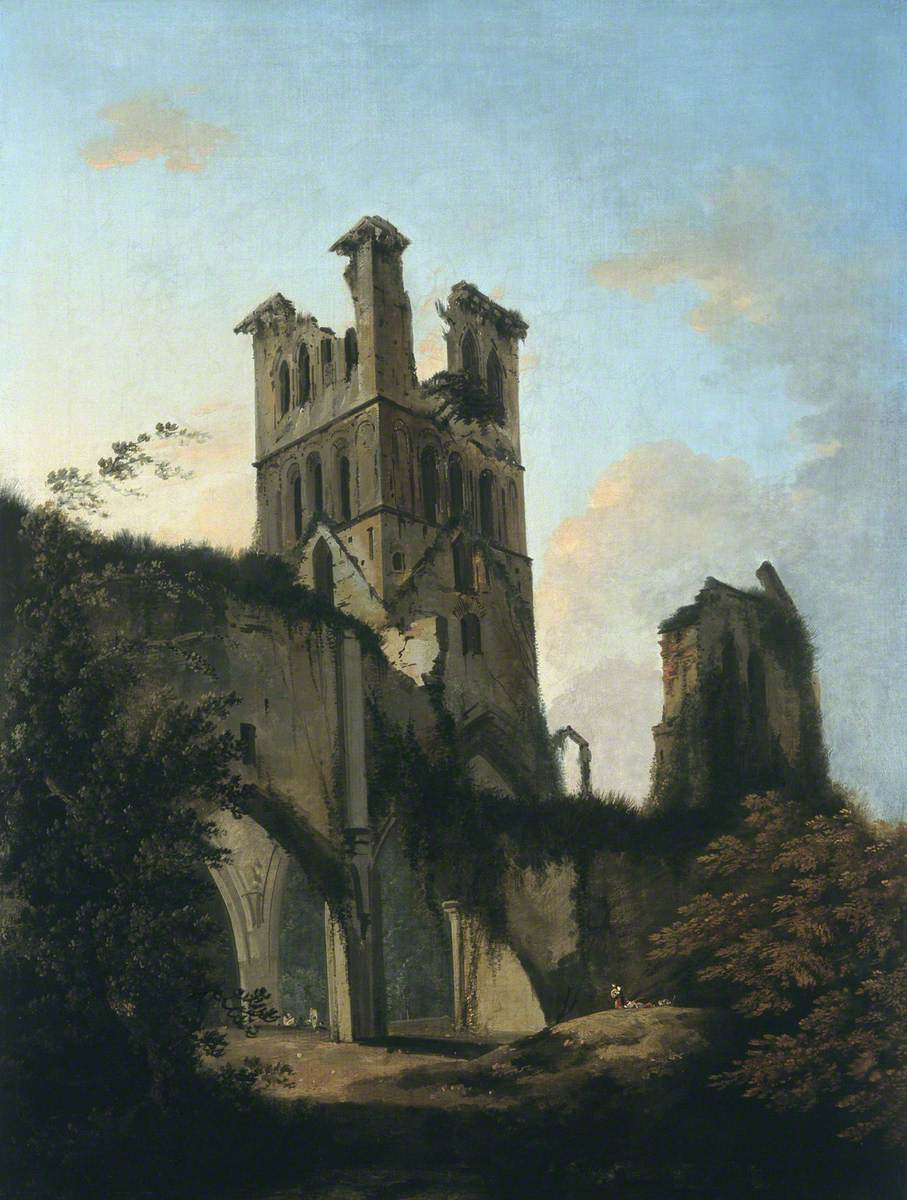
Ruins of Llanthony Abbey, 1778

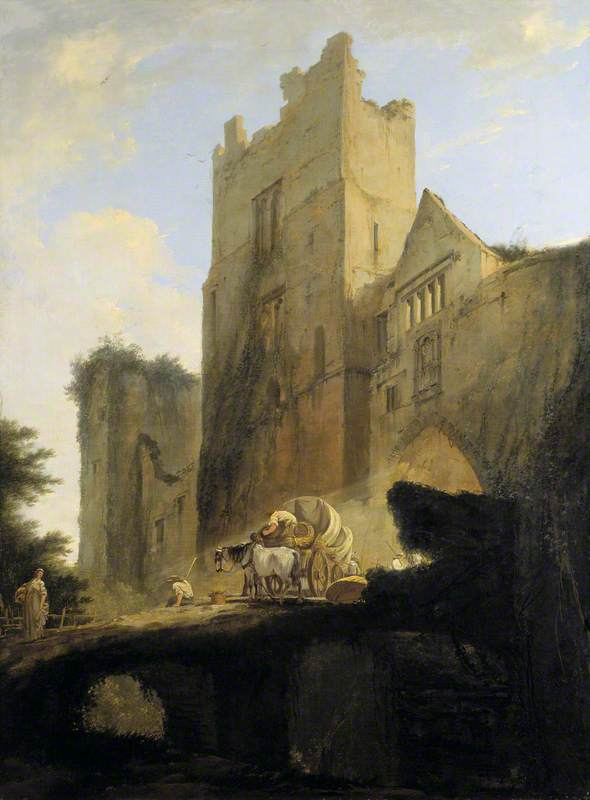
Ludlow Castle, Shropshire, 1778

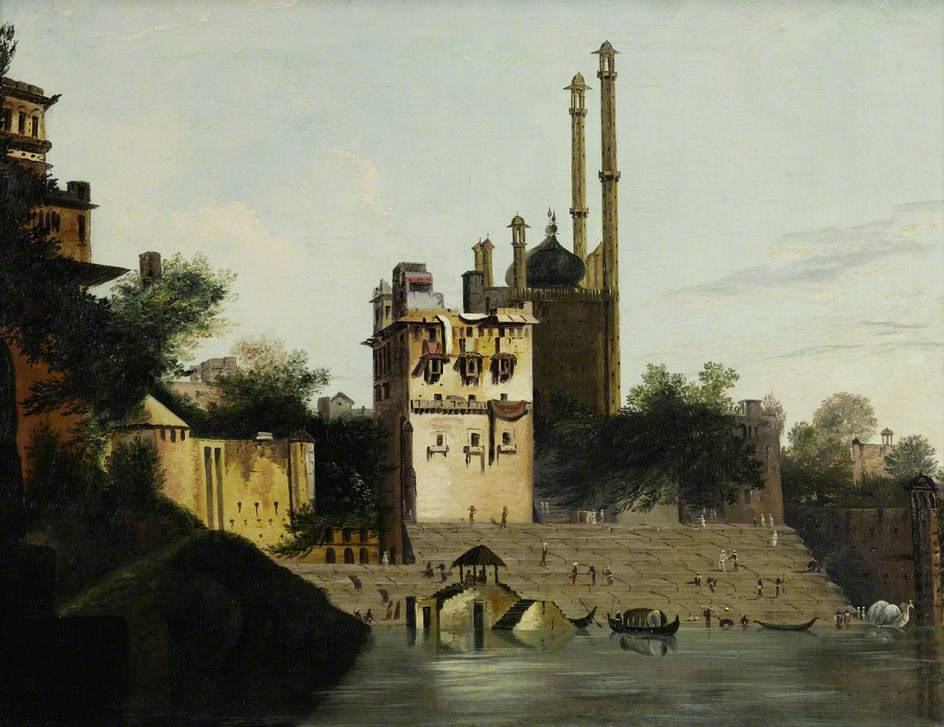
A View of Benares, 1781

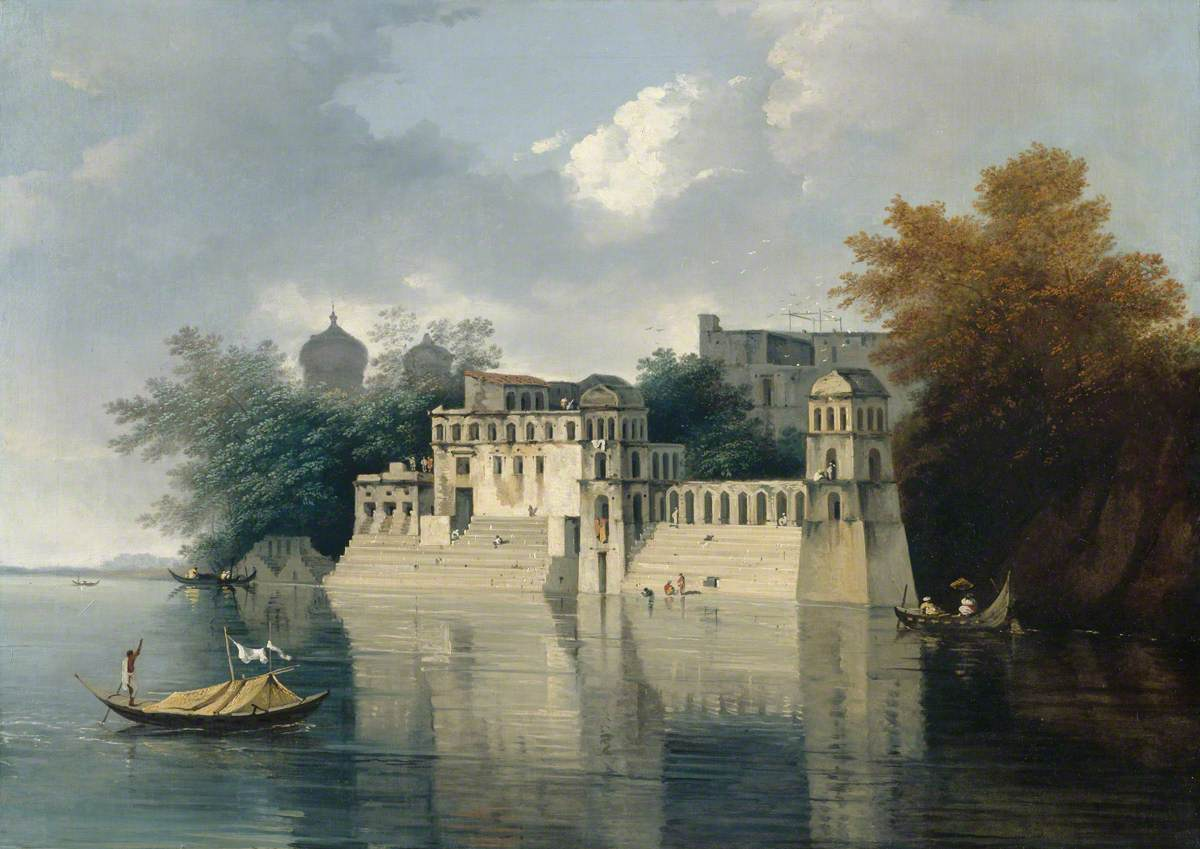
The Ghauts at Benares, 1787
