= Lord Adolphus FitzClarence =

British naval officer (1802–1856)

Rear-Admiral Lord Adolphus FitzClarence GCH ADC
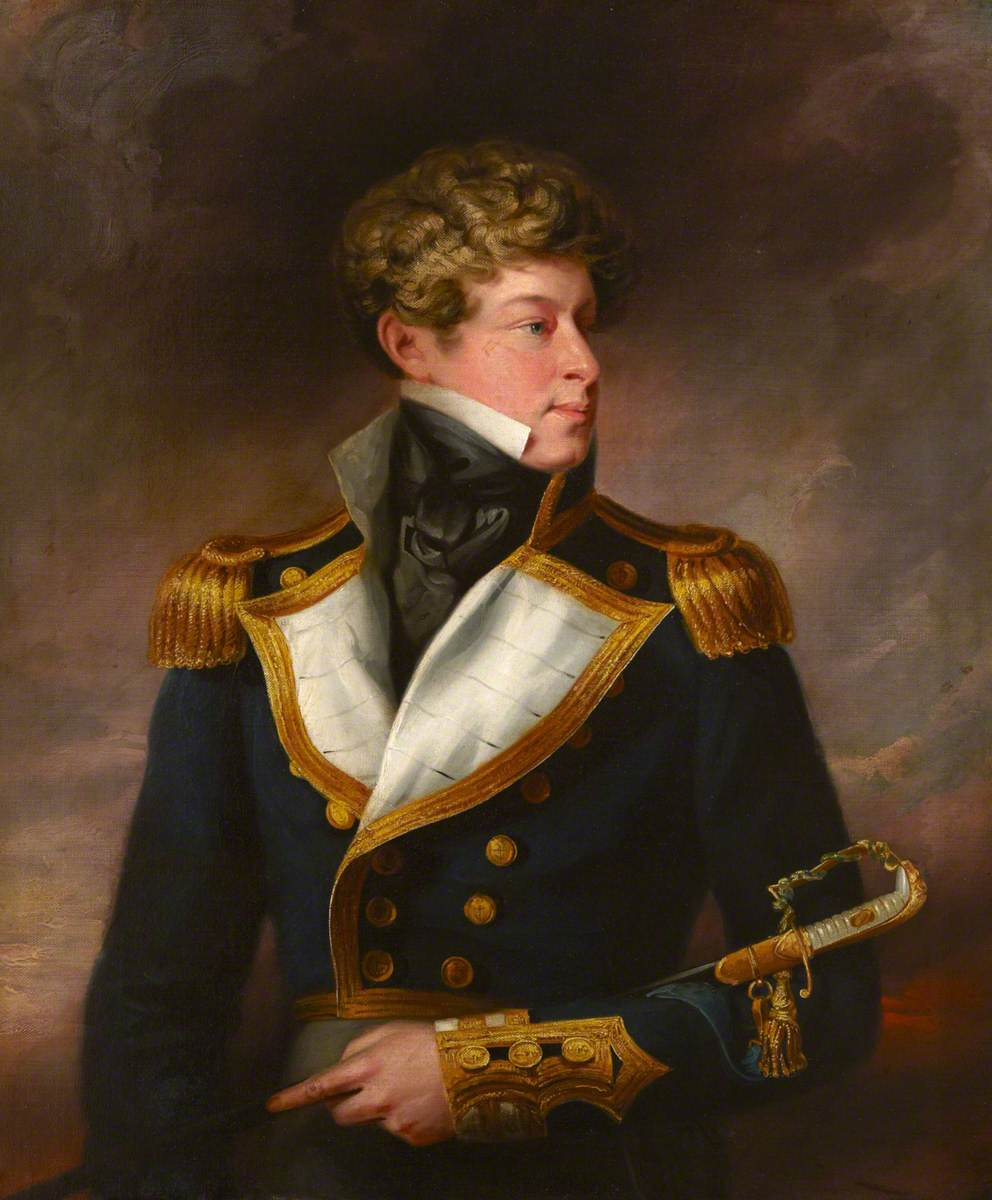
- Anonymous portrait, c. 1823–1824, from The Courts, Holt
- Born: 18 February 1802; Bushy Park, Teddington, London, England
- Died: 17 May 1856 (aged 54); Newburgh Priory, Coxwold, North Yorkshire, England
- Burial place: St Michael's Church, Coxwold
- Relatives: William IV (father); Dorothea Jordan (mother)
- Military career
- Allegiance: United Kingdom
- Branch: Royal Navy
- Service years: 1813–1856
- Rank: Rear-Admiral
- Commands: HMS Brisk; HMS Redwing; HMS Ariadne; HMS Challenger; HMS Pallas; HMY Royal George; HMY Victoria and Albert
- Conflicts: Napoleonic Wars; War of 1812

Rear-Admiral Lord Adolphus FitzClarence GCH ADC (18 February 1802 – 17 May 1856) was a British Royal Navy officer and illegitimate son of Prince William, the future William IV, and his mistress Dorothea Jordan. FitzClarence joined the navy in 1813. In the following year he joined a fourth rate which saw service in the War of 1812, including in the unsuccessful blockade and chase of USS Constitution. FitzClarence saw frequent service in the Mediterranean Sea. Coming under the patronage of Rear-Admiral Sir Thomas Fremantle, FitzClarence received further naval education from Commander William Henry Smyth and served in the Ionian Islands upholding British neutrality in the Greek War of Independence.

FitzClarence was promoted to commander in 1823 and in quick succession commanded two brig-sloops in the North Sea, before being promoted to captain at the end of the year. His rapid rise through the ranks was brought about by the influence of his father. After another period serving in the Mediterranean, FitzClarence was employed escorting dignitaries, such as George Ramsay, 9th Earl of Dalhousie, to and from their posts abroad. He spent time in India, Canada, and off Lisbon, the latter in response to the outbreak of the Liberal Wars.

In 1830 FitzClarence's father was crowned king. In quick succession FitzClarence was given command of the royal yacht HMY Royal George, created a Knight Grand Cross of the Royal Guelphic Order, and appointed Groom of the Robes. He was only occasionally called to captain Royal George. When his father died in 1837, FitzClarence's cousin Victoria took the throne and, to his surprise, allowed FitzClarence to continue in command of the royal yacht, which was replaced with HMY Victoria and Albert. He commanded the new yacht on trips for Victoria and her family, including fleet reviews and diplomatic visits to France. FitzClarence retired from the Royal Navy upon being promoted to rear-admiral in 1853 and died, unmarried, three years later.

== Early life ==
Adolphus FitzClarence was born at Bushy Park, Middlesex, now Greater London, on 18 February 1802. He was the seventh illegitimate child of Prince William, Duke of Clarence and his mistress, the actress Dorothea Jordan. Clarence named most of his children after his siblings. FitzClarence was named for Prince Adolphus, Duke of Cambridge. FitzClarence was especially close with his mother, from whom he inherited a love of the theatre. (Note: FitzClarence would go on to assist in the foundation of the theatrical gentleman's club, the Garrick Club.) In 1808 she described him as:

really the finest child I have ever saw and certainly the handsomest of all mine.

Clarence discarded Jordan in 1811 when put under pressure to marry a foreign princess and produce a legitimate heir. FitzClarence attended a boarding school in Sunbury-on-Thames and then in 1813, with the Napoleonic Wars ongoing, joined the Royal Navy.

== Military career ==
=== War of 1812 ===
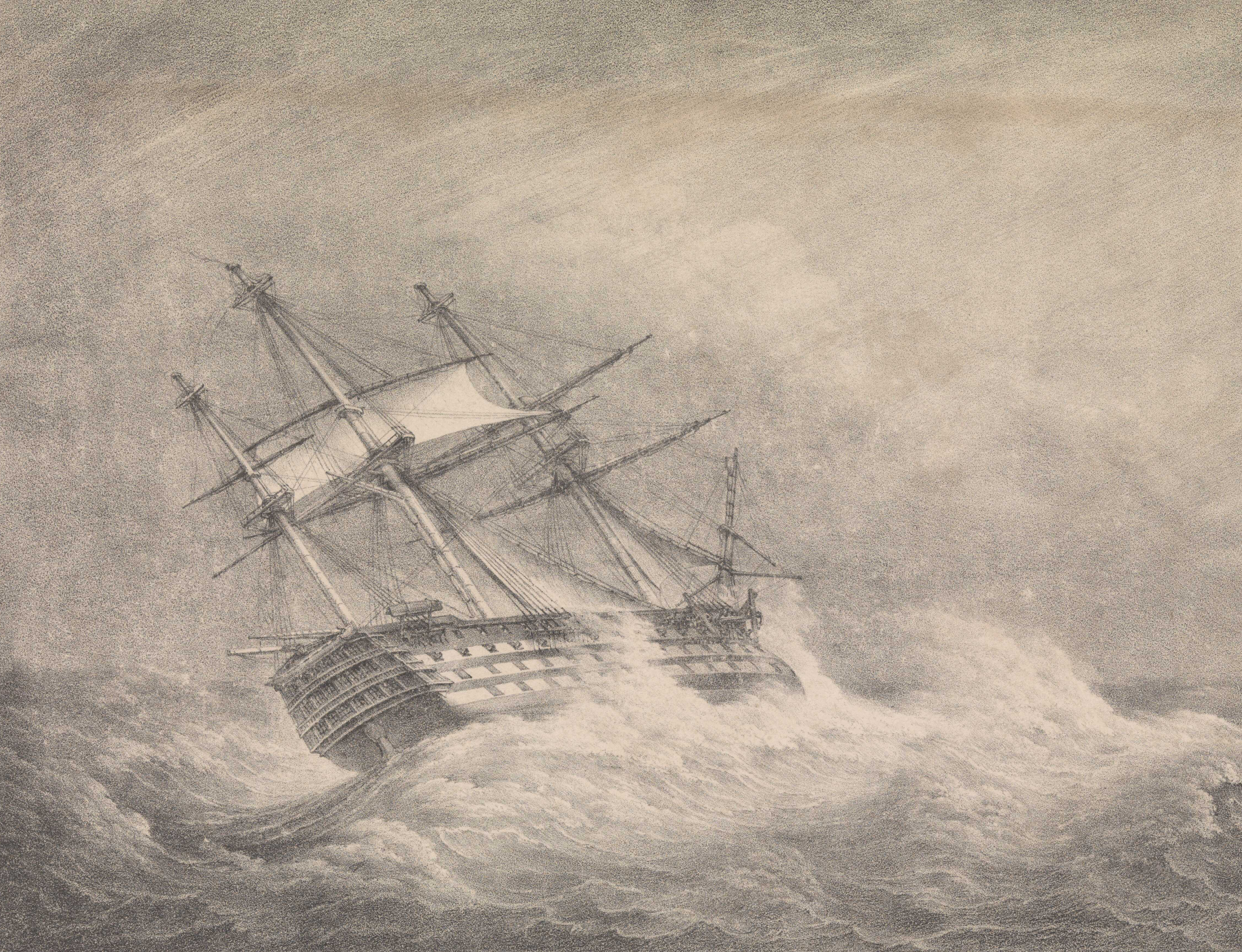
HMS Impregnable, the first ship FitzClarence served in

As a first-class volunteer, FitzClarence joined the 98-gun ship of the line HMS Impregnable on 26 May 1814. Impregnable was part of the escort charged with taking the monarchs allied to Britain, Alexander I of Russia and Frederick William III of Prussia, from Calais to Dover for peace celebrations. FitzClarence's father, as admiral of the fleet, commanded the escort with Impregnable as his flagship. The process was completed on 6 June. While Clarence stayed in Impregnable to organise the return of Alexander and Frederick to France, FitzClarence transferred to serve on board the 50-gun fourth rate HMS Newcastle on 15 June.

With the War of 1812 ongoing, Newcastle sailed from Spithead on 23 June as escort to a convoy travelling to Halifax, Nova Scotia. The ship captured an American privateer en route and arrived on 17 September, after which she joined the blockade of the 44-gun frigate USS Constitution in Boston. During this, FitzClarence was promoted to midshipman on 14 October. Constitution escaped the blockade in December, and Newcastle was one of three ships to chase her to the Cape Verde Islands, from where the ship escaped the British and returned to Boston after a brief skirmish on 11 March 1815. Newcastle spent time at Barbados, Halifax, and Quebec before returning to Britain on 26 September.

=== Mediterranean service ===
Newcastle was paid off and after two months of leave, FitzClarence joined the 38-gun frigate HMS Tagus on 27 November. He became lifelong friends with Midshipman Charles Fremantle, a future admiral, who joined Tagus at the same time. Tagus joined the Mediterranean Fleet in early 1816, where talks were ongoing with Algiers to stop the Barbary States' practice of Christian slavery. As part of this process Tagus sailed to Constantinople, carrying Algerian diplomats in May. Tagus was refused permission to pass through the Dardanelles and waited for the return of the diplomats at the Tavşan Islands. Perceiving that they would be heavily delayed, Tagus returned to the Mediterranean Fleet in August, but only arrived at Malta on 31 August, missing the bombardment of Algiers by four days.

The majority of the Mediterranean Fleet returned to Britain in the wake of the bombardment, but Tagus and FitzClarence stayed in the Mediterranean, based on the Ionian Islands for much of 1817 to ensure that the plague there did not spread to the mainland. For three months during the summer FitzClarence left Tagus to serve in the flagship in the Mediterranean, HMS Albion. During this period he visited Palermo, Naples, Livorno, and Malta. FitzClarence then returned to Tagus, which in April 1818 sailed to Alexandria, escorting two sons of Slimane of Morocco to Tangier.

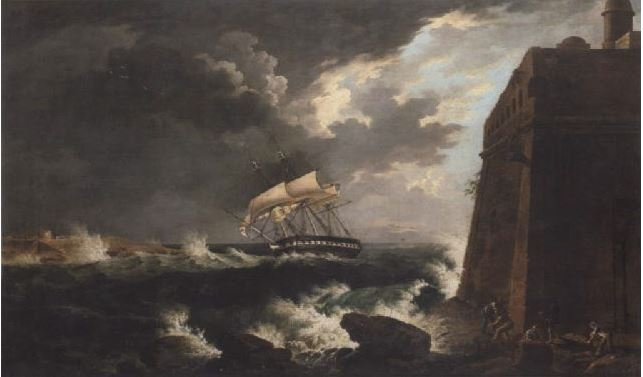
HMS Tagus, with FitzClarence aboard, running into Marsamxett Harbour, Malta, in 1815

Joining the ship for the journey was FitzClarence's brother Captain George FitzClarence, taking British Army dispatches from India to Britain. George remarked on the surprising ability of the FitzClarence brothers to coincidentally meet each other, Adolphus and George having very briefly crossed paths before during the chase of Constitution. Tagus arrived at Malta on 15 May and remained in the Mediterranean until November, when she returned to Britain to be paid off.

FitzClarence left Tagus on 26 December and soon after joined the 74-gun ship of the line HMS Rochfort. Also serving in Rochfort was another of FitzClarence's brothers, Midshipman Augustus FitzClarence. Rochfort was designated as the new flagship for the Mediterranean under Rear-Admiral Sir Thomas Fremantle, the father of FitzClarence's friend Charles, who would soon also join the ship. FitzClarence's previous captain on Tagus reported to the elder Fremantle that FitzClarence was "promising, but his eye (the most necessary appendage of a Seaman) prevents his being so quick as he should be."

FitzClarence likely had a damaged eye. The politician Sir William Fraser recorded that FitzClarence "was a man of peculiar appearance. Having one eyelid drooping, he held his head at a particular angle." Rochfort arrived in the Mediterranean on 3 March 1819, and in April Fremantle had his son and FitzClarence transferred to the 10-gun sloop HMS Aid. The ship was employed on surveying duties in the Ionian Islands and Adriatic Sea under Commander William Henry Smyth, who Fremantle thought to be a "remarkable good astronomer, draughtsman and surveyor". It was the admiral's hope that by posting the two to Smyth they would improve their navigational skills. FitzClarence returned to Rochfort in July, subsequently visiting Algiers and Tunis as part of Anglo-French efforts to stop Barbary piracy through diplomatic means. In early December Fremantle reported to Clarence that he was "quite satisfied" with both FitzClarence brothers on Rochfort.

Two weeks later the admiral died in Naples. Rochfort returned home with Fremantle's family in February 1820, but FitzClarence stayed in the Mediterranean by transferring to the 40-gun frigate HMS Glasgow, whose captain became commander-in-chief in the wake of Fremantle's death. Glasgow initially served off the Ionian Islands before being stationed off Naples when it was thought that Austria might invade the nation. The ship paid off at Portsmouth in March 1821.

=== Lieutenant ===
FitzClarence was promoted to lieutenant on 23 April. His first posting as a lieutenant came in November when he was sent to the 42-gun frigate HMS Euryalus, initially at Spithead but expected to sail for the Mediterranean. Before this happened, Clarence visited to inspect the ship on 29 January 1822, spending three hours on board. Euryalus left for the Mediterranean soon afterwards and was stationed in the Ionian Islands as part of the British response to the Greek War of Independence. Both Britain and the Ionians were neutral parties in the conflict, but with close ties between the islands and Greece, Euryalus was employed ensuring that no assistance was given to the Greeks, and to defeat any marauding Greek corsairs.

Euryalus was subsequently sent on several diplomatic missions, first visiting Naples in November to give a portrait as a gift to Pope Pius VII, and then travelling to Tunis for further anti-piracy talks in June 1823. FitzClarence continued in Euryalus until 13 July when, at Zante, he learned of his promotion to commander which had taken place on 17 May. He returned to Britain via Malta soon afterwards.

=== First commands ===
FitzClarence's first command came on 9 January 1824 when he joined the 10-gun brig-sloop HMS Brisk, whose previous commander had drowned at Sheerness two weeks earlier. He commanded Brisk on the North Sea Station until 28 February, when he was transferred to command the 18-gun brig-sloop HMS Redwing, also in the North Sea. His first service in Redwing was to escort Clarence, sailing in HMY Royal Sovereign, from the Thames to Plymouth and back again. FitzClarence met his father again at Spithead in October when Clarence inspected the fleet there, including a half-hour visit to Redwing. As Clarence passed back and forth around the fleet, Redwing was forced to fire seven 21-gun salutes in three hours. The ship was subsequently posted to Newcastle-upon-Tyne to help put down unrest among the merchant seamen there at the request of the mayor.

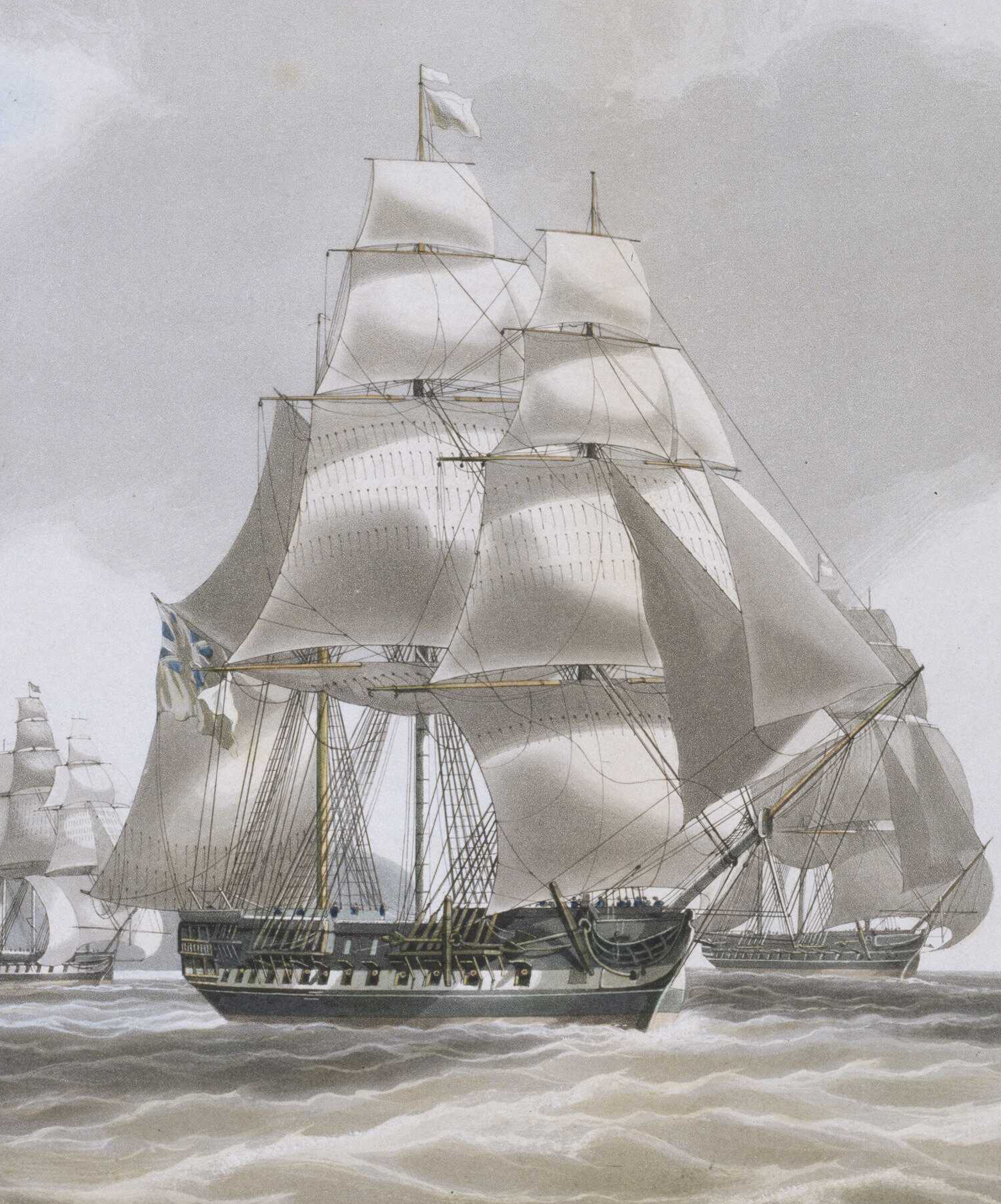
HMS Ariadne, FitzClarence's first command as a captain

Still only twenty-two years old, FitzClarence was promoted to captain on 24 December. This quick promotion came about because of the strong influence of his father Clarence, and was equalled in the service only by the rise of Richard Saunders Dundas, whose father was First Lord of the Admiralty. FitzClarence left Redwing in January 1825 and spent a year on half pay, before on 9 February 1826 he was appointed to command the 20-gun post ship HMS Ariadne. This was another occasion in which FitzClarence replaced a captain in unusual circumstances, the previous commander of Ariadne having been dismissed for purchasing a slave at Zanzibar to use as a prostitute.

=== Return to the Mediterranean ===
FitzClarence sailed Ariadne to the Mediterranean in June, carrying money for the treasuries of Gibraltar, Malta, and Corfu. Having completed this duty FitzClarence returned to the Ionian Islands, where he again served to preserve neutrality in the ongoing Greek War of Independence. He most likely met another of his brothers, Lieutenant-Colonel Frederick FitzClarence, while the latter served with his British Army unit on Corfu. In November the Governor of Malta, Francis Rawdon-Hastings, 1st Marquess of Hastings, died in the Bay of Naples. Ariadne, at the time at Naples, was sent to return his body to Malta. In early 1827 the ship then carried the replacement governor, Sir Frederick Ponsonby, from Corfu to Malta. While at Corfu FitzClarence learned that his father's elder brother Prince Frederick, Duke of York and Albany, had died, leaving Clarence heir to the throne.

Continuing the trend of meeting his siblings in the course of his naval duties, in May FitzClarence transported his sister Amelia FitzClarence through the Adriatic alongside Lucius Cary, 10th Viscount Falkland, who she would marry three years later. FitzClarence continued to command Ariadne in the Mediterranean until 28 September when he was superseded. He thus missed his second naval battle, the Battle of Navarino taking place three weeks later. FitzClarence returned to Britain as a passenger in the 46-gun frigate HMS Seringapatam. He arrived at Portsmouth just as his father, who had been made Lord High Admiral of the United Kingdom, was making an inspection of the fleet and as such was visited by him before leaving the ship.

=== Diplomatic and escort duties ===
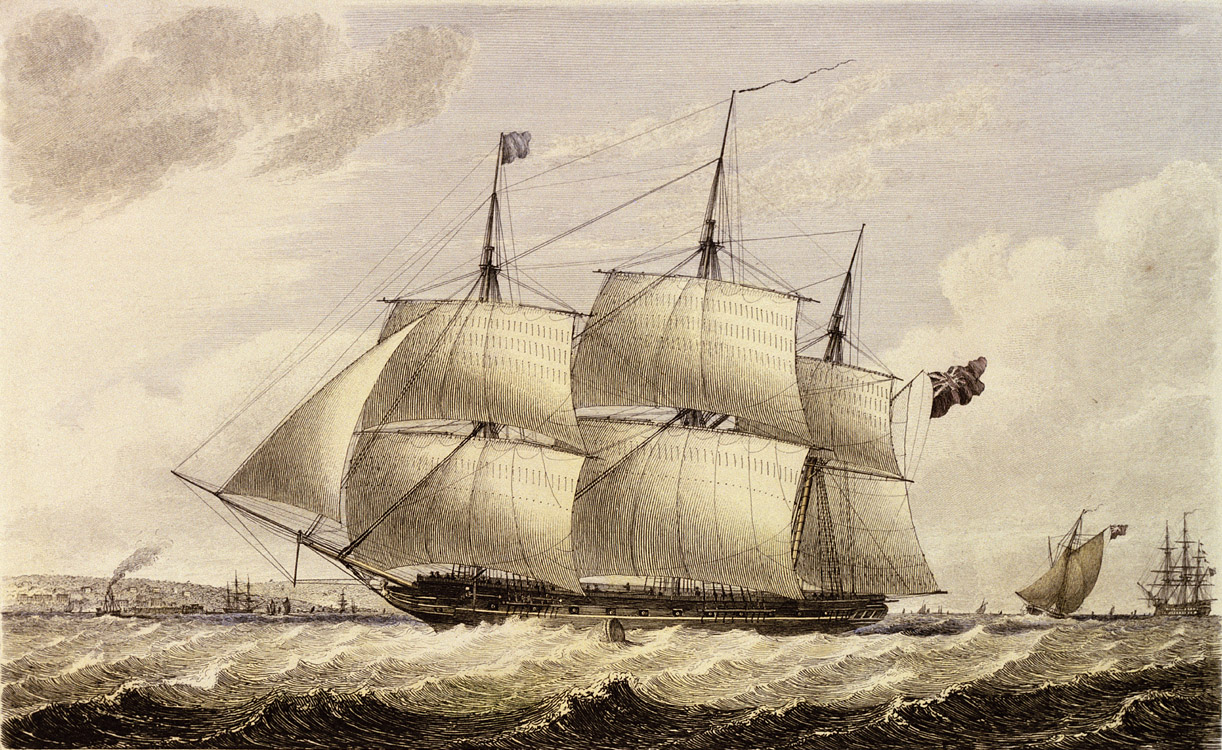
HMS Challenger sails to Lisbon under the command of FitzClarence, by Henry Moses

FitzClarence received his next command, of the 28-gun frigate HMS Challenger, in December. The ship sailed from Portsmouth in March 1828 to join the Lisbon Station, protecting British interests as Portugal headed towards the opening of the Liberal Wars. There was little for the British force to do and the ships returned to Britain in May. Challenger was then ordered to Canada in June, where she conveyed the new Governor General of Canada, Sir James Kempt, from Halifax to Quebec. FitzClarence then took on board the previous holder of that office, George Ramsay, 9th Earl of Dalhousie, and escorted him home to Scotland. On 28 August Clarence, who was soon to leave his post as Lord High Admiral, used his influence to have FitzClarence given command of the 42-gun frigate HMS Pallas.

FitzClarence swapped commands with his old friend Charles Fremantle, with the latter taking command of Challenger. Continuing the relationship between the FitzClarences and Fremantles, Charles' younger brother Midshipman Stephen Grenville Fremantle had been serving under FitzClarence on Challenger, and transferred with him to Pallas. With the Liberal Wars having begun, in December Pallas was sent with several other ships to preserve the Liberal-controlled Azores from a Miguelist expedition sailing from Britain to attack them. FitzClarence was senior British officer on the blockade until Pallas returned to Plymouth in February 1829.

Upon his arrival, the Admiralty demanded a report from FitzClarence over two news articles about his service off the Azores that had appeared in The Times without the Admiralty's prior knowledge of the events. The first of these articles suggested that FitzClarence had failed to stop an American merchant ship from breaking the blockade and landing 300 Portuguese soldiers, and the second reported that FitzClarence and three of his men had been wounded by Portuguese soldiers over a water supply dispute while ashore. FitzClarence argued in his report to the Admiralty that both Times articles were grossly exaggerated.

Later in the year FitzClarence again acted as escort to Dalhousie, who had been appointed Commander-in-Chief, India. Pallas left Britain on 20 July carrying Dalhousie and John Turner, Anglican Bishop of Calcutta, to India, arriving on 9 December having stopped at Madeira and the Cape of Good Hope. In around January 1830 the ship left for Britain with the prior commander-in-chief Stapleton Cotton, 1st Viscount Combermere, on board. They made stops at the Cape, St Helena, and Ascension Island, at the latter location adding turtles to a cargo that already included a Bengal tiger, cheetah, elk, Angora goat, and several antelopes. The ship arrived at Spithead on 30 April.

=== Royal favours ===
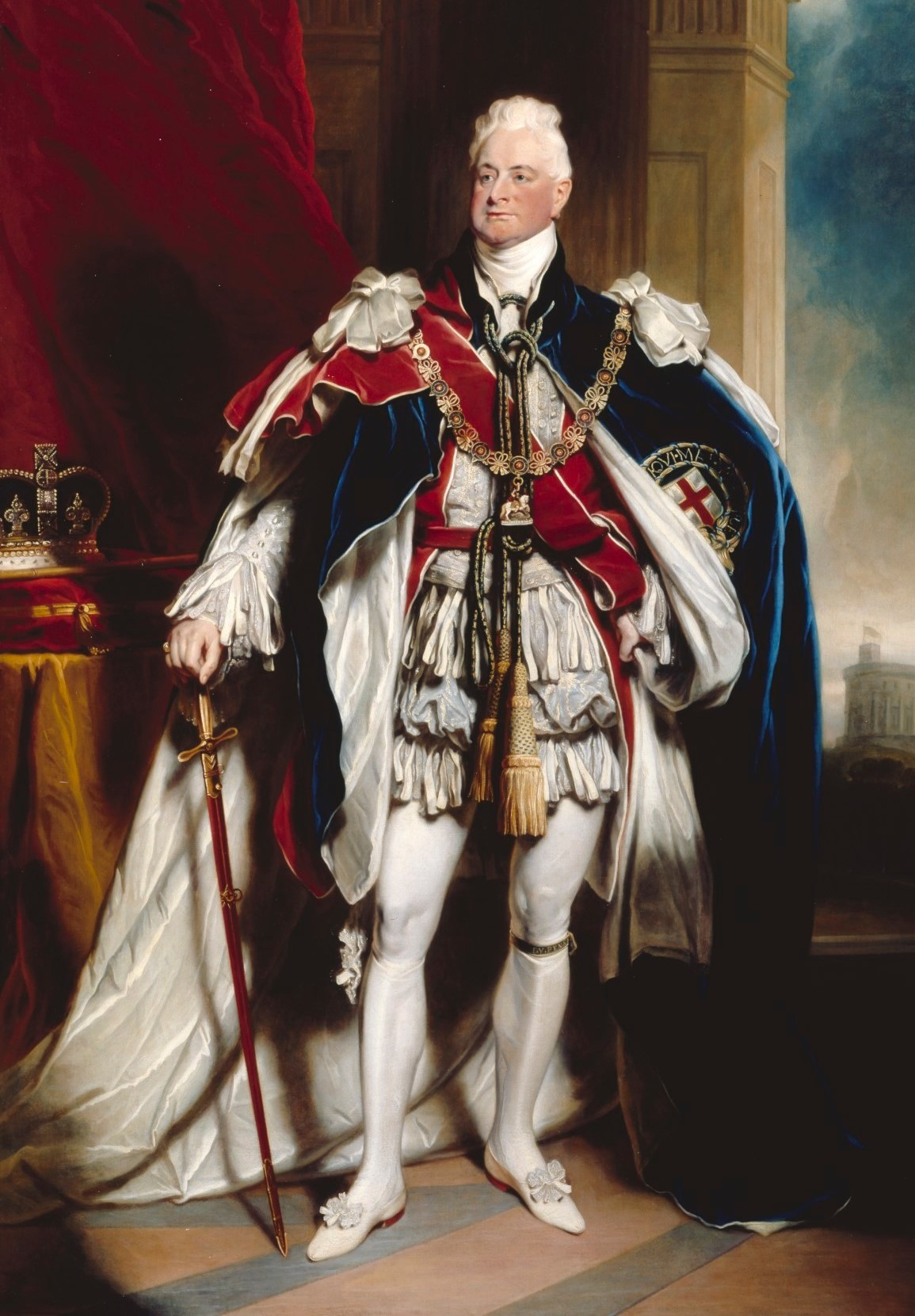
Portrait of William IV by Martin Archer Shee. FitzClarence's father William IV in 1833

George IV died on 26 June and FitzClarence's father took the throne as William IV. FitzClarence was given command of the royal yacht HMY Royal George on 22 July and became Groom of the Robes two days later. Despite his new role with Royal George, FitzClarence had one last duty to complete in Pallas, sailing for Halifax in the same month to bring home his sister Mary Fox and her husband Charles Richard Fox. The ship returned to Portsmouth on 8 September and FitzClarence left the command a day later.

As illegitimate children FitzClarence and his nine siblings had held, and would continue to hold, controversial positions within British society; with their father now the monarch they took advantage, requesting of him new titles, official positions, and money. On 24 May 1831 William granted FitzClarence the rank of a younger son of a marquess by Royal Warrant of Precedence, allowing him to be known as Lord Adolphus FitzClarence. Continuing to reward his illegitimate children, on 24 February 1832 William appointed FitzClarence a Knight Grand Cross of the Royal Guelphic Order, and he subsequently became a Lord of the Bedchamber in Ordinary on 5 January 1833, at which point he relinquished his previous role as Groom of the Robes. FitzClarence was the only one of his five brothers to stay on good terms with their father throughout his reign.

FitzClarence's command of Royal George was almost completely nominal, as the ship only very rarely left Portsmouth. In 1832 and 1833 Royal George's tender Emerald was used by Princess Victoria, Duchess of Kent, and her daughter Princess Victoria, the heir to the throne, for trips to North Wales, but Adolphus was not included on these. The elder Victoria took pains to have her daughter avoid William's illegitimate children, who she believed would "contaminate" her with their company. FitzClarence was instead given other small jobs to complete, such as in 1832 escorting the model frigate Royal Louisa to be presented to Frederick William of Prussia at Potsdam. In 1834 FitzClarence completed his only major service in Royal George herself, taking his stepmother Adelaide of Saxe-Meiningen to Holland and back. William never used the yacht during his reign.

FitzClarence took command of the yacht Firebrand in 1835 to carry Auguste, Duke of Leuchtenberg from Ostend to Woolwich on his way to marry Maria II of Portugal. William attempted to make him Ranger of Home Park, Windsor, in January 1837, but the prime minister, William Lamb, 2nd Viscount Melbourne, refused the appointment to William's "mortification and disappointment".

=== Accession of Victoria ===
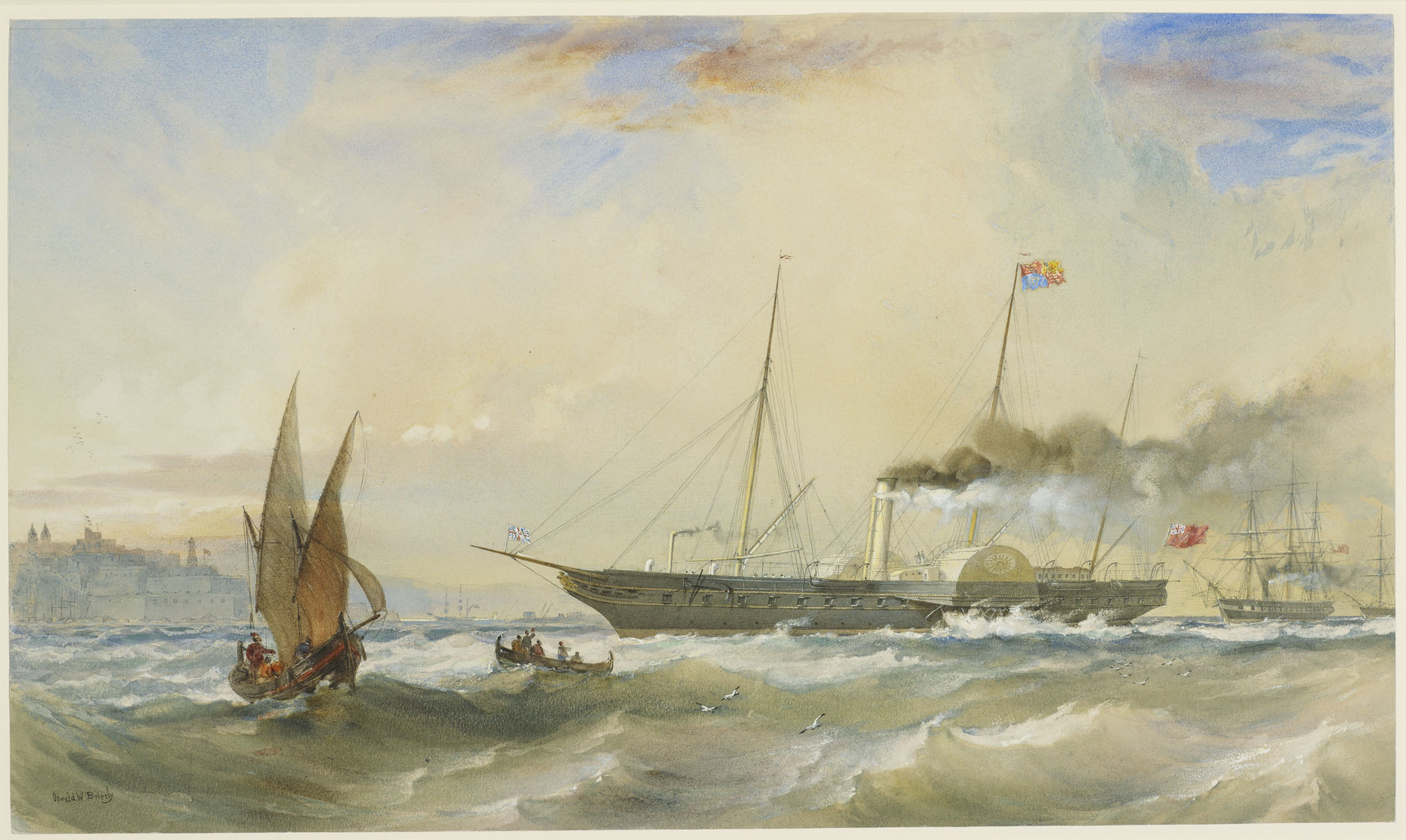
HMY Victoria and Albert, of which FitzClarence was the first captain

Victoria succeeded William on 20 June 1837. FitzClarence lost his position as Lord of the Bedchamber. As an illegitimate child of the former monarch FitzClarence did not expect to retain any of his privileged roles or positions within the British establishment, but Victoria kept him on in command of Royal George and continued to pay the allowance that his uncle George IV had first given him. Victoria reported that he:

burst into tears, and said it was unexpected, for [he and his siblings] did not dare to hope for anything.

Victoria made use of Royal George more often than had FitzClarence's father and his family. She made her first visit to the yacht on 28 February 1842 during a visit to the fleet at Portsmouth, and made use of the ship in August to travel from Woolwich to Leith to begin a tour of Scotland. The voyage was a poor one for Royal George, having to be uncomfortably towed most of the way by two steamships as the wind was against them. Victoria chose to return to Woolwich in a steamship instead of Royal George, and soon afterwards decided to replace the vessel.

FitzClarence was appointed captain of the replacement royal yacht, the paddle steamer HMY Victoria and Albert. The ship was commissioned at Deptford on 8 August. Later that month Victoria, Albert, Prince Consort, and the Home Secretary Sir James Graham, travelled in Victoria and Albert to Dartmouth, Plymouth, and Falmouth, before sailing over to Le Tréport to meet with Louis Philippe I, in the first journey by an English monarch to France since the Field of the Cloth of Gold in 1520. FitzClarence then took the royal party to Ostend on 12 September to visit Victoria's uncle Leopold I of Belgium.

=== Later royal yacht service ===
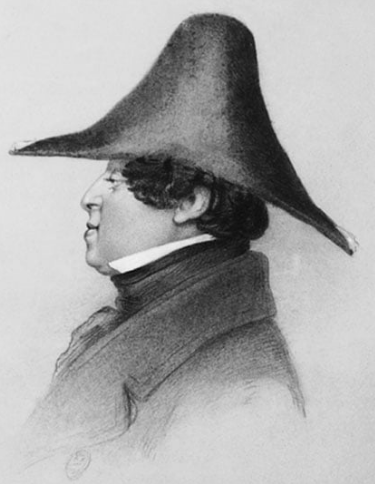
Posthumous portrait of FitzClarence wearing an admiral's hat by Rosa Koberwein, 1877

Victoria used the royal yacht again in October 1844 to review a combined Anglo-French fleet at Spithead in honour of a visit from Louis Philippe. In June the following year FitzClarence commanded Victoria and Albert at Spithead again, as Victoria made a review of the Experimental Squadron there. Victoria and Albert then used the yacht to travel to Germany later in the year, and made a second visit to Le Tréport. The subsequent years of FitzClarence's career were spent commanding the yacht on various cruises for Victoria and her family around Ireland and mainland Europe; he was appointed a naval aide-de-camp to Victoria in 1848.

FitzClarence continued with the royal yacht into the next decade, being appointed a commodore in October 1852. His last major service with Victoria and Albert came on 11 August 1853, when the yacht was used by Victoria at a review of twenty-five Royal Navy warships at Spithead, during which the ship led the fleet out to sea where it had a mock battle with several other warships. FitzClarence was promoted to rear-admiral in September 1853 and at the same time retired from the Royal Navy, ending twenty-three years of royal yacht commands.

FitzClarence continued as an aide-de-camp to Victoria, and after a long illness died at Newburgh Priory on 17 May 1856, aged fifty-four. He never married. Victoria commented upon hearing of his death that:

he positively killed himself by living too well. He was only 54, though he looked quite 10 or 12 years older.

Money had been an issue for FitzClarence throughout most of his life, and his remaining funds were insufficient to pay his debts, funeral expenses, and legacies. He was interred in the chancel of St. Michael's Church, Coxwold.

== Notes and citations ==
=== Citations ===
Court offices
Preceded by ?	Groom of the Robes; 1830–1833	Succeeded by Francis Seymour
Preceded by The Earl of Denbigh	Lord of the Bedchamber; 1833–1837	Succeeded by New court (death of William IV)
