= Admiral Dixon =

Admiral Dixon may refer to:

- Manley Dixon (c. 1760–1837), British Royal Navy admiral
- Manley Hall Dixon (1786–1864), British Royal Navy admiral
- Robert E. Dixon (1906–1981), U.S. Navy admiral
