= HMS Redwing (1806) =

Brig-sloop of the Royal Navy

- Redwing

History

United Kingdom
- Name: HMS Redwing
- Ordered: 24 January 1806
- Builder: Matthew Warren, Brightlingsea
- Launched: 30 August 1806
- Commissioned: October 1806
- Honours and awards: Naval General Service Medal with clasps; "Redwing 7 May 1808"; "Redwing 31 May 1808"; "2 May Boat Service 1813"
- Fate: Foundered 1827

General characteristics
- Class & type: Cruizer-class brig-sloop
- Tons burthen: 38346/94 (bm)
- Length: 100 ft 0 in (30.5 m) (overall); 77 ft 3 1/2 in (23.6 m)
- Beam: 30 ft 6 1/2 in (9.3 m)
- Depth of hold: 12 ft 10 in (3.9 m)
- Sail plan: Brig
- Complement: 121
- Armament: 16 × 32-pounder carronades; 2 × 6-pounder bow guns

HMS Redwing was a Cruizer-class brig-sloop of the British Royal Navy. Commissioned in 1806, she saw active service in the Napoleonic Wars, mostly in the Mediterranean, and afterwards served off the West Coast of Africa, acting to suppress the slave trade. She was lost at sea in 1827.

== The Mediterranean in wartime ==
Redwing was built by Matthew Warren at Brightlingsea, Essex, and launched on 30 August 1806. She was commissioned in October 1806 under Commander Thomas Ussher, and on 31 January 1807, sailed for the Mediterranean. There she was stationed in the Strait of Gibraltar, and operated in company with Scout and Morgiana to clear the area of enemy vessels. The Commander in Chief, Vice-Admiral Lord Collingwood, in a letter to William Marsden, dated 24 May 1807, praised their effectiveness, noting that "within this Fortnight past they have taken and destroyed Eighteen of the Enemy's Vessels". One of these may have been the mistico Tiger, which Redwing intercepted as she was sailing from Cádiz to Algeciras. Redwing sent her into Gibraltar.

Numerous captures and actions followed.

- On 13 June 1807 Redwing and Scout chased a felucca and the Spanish privateer De Bon Vassallio, which mounted one 24 and two 6-pounder guns, into the mouth of the Barbate River, south of Cádiz. They then sent their boats to board and destroy the privateer. They also captured and destroyed two signal posts.
- On 22 September, Redwing and two boats from Excellent captured the merchant ship Paulina, and on 3 October 1807 Redwing took the Twillingen.
- On 2 March 1808 Redwing and Confounder captured the American ship Ocean, and on 12 April 1808 Redwing and Minorca captured the American ship Hope.
- In early 1808, or so, Redwing captured the Charlotta, Ferrier, master, which had sailed from La Guayra, and sent her into Gibraltar.
- On 7 May, she attacked a Spanish convoy of seven gun-boats and armed vessels, and 12 unarmed merchantmen off Cape Trafalgar. In a short but vigorous action she drove four gun-boats ashore and sank them, captured one, and two escaped. The gunboats sunk included Diligent, of two 24-pounder guns, two 8-pounders, and 60 men, Boreas of the same strength, No. 3, of two 24-pounders, one 36-pounder and 36 men, and No. 6, of one 24-pounder and 40 men. Redwing also captured a mistico of four 6-pounders and 20 men. Gunboat No. 107, of two 6-poundrs and 35 men, and a felucca of four 3-pounders and 20 men, escaped. Redwing then sank four of the merchantmen and captured seven; one escaped. Redwing lost one man killed and had three men wounded, one severely. For this action in 1847 the Admiralty awarded the Naval General Service Medal (NGSM) with clasp "Redwing 7 May 1808" to the seven still surviving claimants from the action.

At the end of the month, Redwing engaged in another medal-winning action. She chased a mistico and two feluccas into the Bay of Bolonia (Tarifa). There her quarry took shelter under a shore battery of six 24-pounder guns. Ussher brought Redwing to anchor within point-blank range of the battery, using her broadsides to silence its guns. A cutting-out party under Lieutenant Ferguson then destroyed the mistico and extracted the feluccas. Ussher and Ferguson, with a landing party of 40 men, then captured the battery and spiked its guns. This, and his previous actions, led to Ussher's promotion to post captain. In 1847 the Admiralty awarded the NGSM with clasp "Redwing 31 May 1808" to the five surviving claimants from the action.

Commander Edward Augustus Down then took command of Redwing in August and sailed her to the Mediterranean on 23 September 1808.

- On 8 February 1809, the boats of Redwing and the frigate Amphion, under the command of William Hoste, cut out an armed brig and a coaster at Melada in Dalmatia, then part of the Napoleonic Kingdom of Italy.
- On 16 September 1811 Redwing, captured the French 4-gun privateer, Le Victorieux, off Sicily, three days out of Tunis.
- On 8 May 1812, off Cape St. Vieto, Redwing took a small Neapolitan privateer of one gun.

Command of Redwing passed to Commander Sir John Gordon Sinclair in August 1812 and she operated off the south coast of France, taking part in numerous operations:

- On 18 March 1813, seamen and marines of Redwing, under the command of Lieutenant Aaron Tozer, landed on the French coast and destroyed a coastal battery consisting of four 24-pounder guns, a 6-pounder field-gun, and a 13-inch mortar at Carry-le-Rouet, west of Marseille, before capturing a tartane, anchored nearby.
- On 31 March 1813, an attack was made, under the command of Lieutenant Shaw of Volontaire, by the marines of the frigates Volontaire and Undaunted, and the brigs Redwing and Shearwater on a strongpoint at Morgion, near Marseille. The marines landed during the night, and at daybreak captured two batteries. They threw the guns, five 36-pounders in one, and two 24-pounders in the other, into the sea, and destroyed all their ammunition. The boats of the ships then captured eight tartanes and three settees, laden with oil, nuts, hides and firewood, while Redwing provided close protection. Casualties amounted to only one man killed and four wounded, while the French lost four killed, five wounded, and a lieutenant and 16 men of the 62nd Regiment taken prisoner.
- On 3 April, Nautilus and Redwing captured the Greek vessel St. Nicolo, and took her into Malta.
- On 2 May boats from Redwing, Undaunted, Volontaire, and Repulse again stormed the batteries at Morgion. This action led the Admiralty to issue Redwing a third clasp, marked "2 May Boat Service 1813", to the NGSM for her part in this action.
- On 24 May Redwing, Nautilus and Carlotta captured the privateer Columbo. (Note: Carlotta did not share in the head-money for the capture. Furthermore, because her captain was a lieutenant, and the captains of the other two vessels were commanders, Fleming was only entitled to a second-class share, while the other two were entitled to first-class shares. Fleming's second-class share was worth £8 15s 1¼d; a sixth-class share, that of an ordinary seaman, was worth 5s 10½d. A first-class share to Nautilus and Redwing was worth £27 6s 2½d; a sixth-class share was worth 7s 6½d.)
- On 18 August, a landing party made up of men from Redwing, Espoir, and the frigate Undaunted, stormed shore batteries at Cassis, east of Marseille, and captured three pinnaces.
- On 14 December 1813, Redwing captured the Boa Fe Nova. This may be the same vessel as the Boa Fé Saltaza, which had been sailing from Rio de Janeiro to Oporto and which Redwing captured and sent into Portsmouth some days later.

== Post-war ==
In August 1814, Commander Thomas Young was appointed to command Redwing. She was paid off in 1815.

By 1817 she was laid up at Deptford, but was recommissioned in 1818 under C. Simeon. By August of that year she was under the command of Commander Frederick Hunn at Saint Helena, and commissioned in November 1820 under the command of the Honourable George Rolle Walpole Trefusis. (Note: For more on George Rolle Walpole Trefusis see: O'Byrne, William R. (1849). "Trefusis, George Rolle Walpole" . A Naval Biographical Dictionary. London: John Murray.) From February 1824 she was under the command of Adolphus FitzClarence at the Nore until paid off in January 1825.

=== West Africa ===
In January 1825 Commander Douglas Clavering, who in 1823 in HMS Griper had led a scientific expedition to Svalbard and Greenland, was appointed captain of Redwing, and assigned to the West Africa Squadron, engaged in the suppression of the slave trade.

She made several captures:

- On 9 September 1825 the ships HMS Atholl, Esk, and Redwing captured the Brazilian slave-vessel Uniao.
- On 6 October 1825 Redwing captured the Spanish brigantine Isabella with 273 slaves aboard.
- That same day Redwing captured the Spanish schooner Ana, and five days later Teresa. with 199 slaves. Prize money for the hulls and cargoes, and bounty for released slaves, was paid on 25 April 1827. (Note: The captain received £1,006 11s 6d, while ordinary seamen received £7 13s 7½d each.)

== Disappearance and fate ==
Redwing sailed from Sierra Leone in June 1827 and was never seen again. Wreckage washed ashore in November near Mataceney suggested that lightning had started a fire that destroyed her.
