= HMS Challenger (1826) =

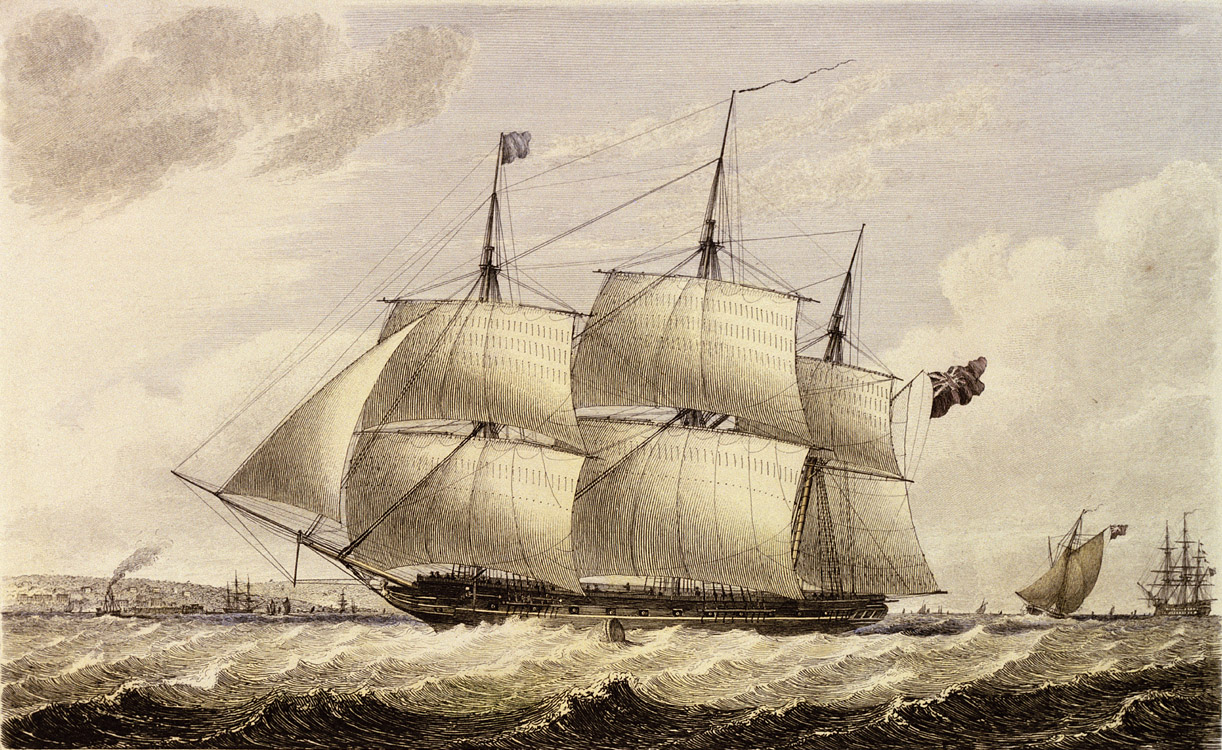
- Challenger, commanded by Captain FitzClarence, sailing from Portsmouth with dispatches for Lisbon on 31 October 1827

History

United Kingdom
- Name: HMS Challenger
- Ordered: 9 June 1825; Reordered: 27 June 1825
- Builder: Portsmouth Dockyard
- Laid down: November 1825
- Launched: 14 November 1826
- Completed: By 9 March 1827
- Fate: Wrecked on 19 May 1835

General characteristics
- Class & type: 28-gun sixth rate
- Tons burthen: 60291/94 (bm)
- Length: Overall:125 ft 7 1/2 in (38.3 m); Keel:105 ft 11 1/2 in (32.3 m)
- Beam: 32 ft 8 in (10.0 m)
- Depth of hold: 9 ft 3 1/4 in (2.8 m)
- Sail plan: Full-rigged ship
- Complement: 175
- Armament: Gun deck: 20 × 32-pounder (14,528 g, 32.029 lb) carronades; QD: 6 × 18-pounder (8,172 g, 18.016 lb) carronades; Fc: 2 × 9-pounder (4,086 g, 9.008 lb)

HMS Challenger was a 28-gun sixth rate of the Royal Navy launched at Portsmouth, England, on 14 November 1826.

== Royal patronage ==
Challenger was commanded in 1827 by Captain FitzClarence, the illegitimate son of William IV. His father was still the Duke of Clarence in 1827, the year he became Lord High Admiral.

== Fremantle ==
Under the command of Charles Fremantle, she was in part responsible for the creation of the colony of Swan River in 1829. Captain Fremantle was under orders to take possession of the western side of New Holland on behalf of the British government. Challenger arrived on 25 April 1829 off Garden Island. She attempted to sail into Cockburn Sound the next day, but due to the incompetence of the sailing master, struck a rock midway between Garden and Carnac Islands. Challenger was not seriously damaged.

== Fate ==
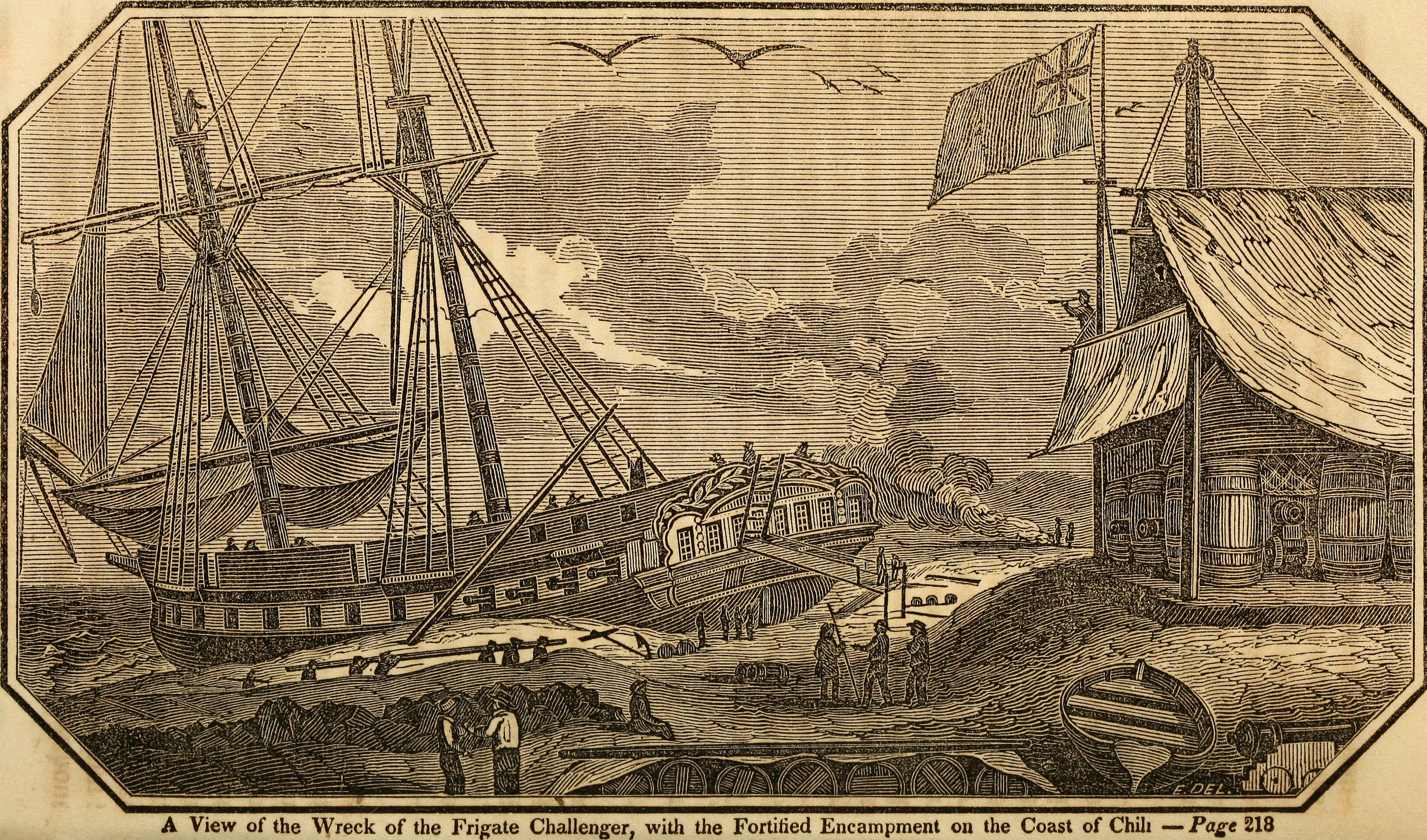
The wreck of HMS Challenger, with the encampment built by the crew

Challenger was wrecked off Mocha Island, Chile on 19 May 1835, with the loss of two lives. HMS Blonde rescued the survivors on 15 June.

Challenger was under the command of Captain Michael Seymour. She sailed from Rio de Janeiro on 1 April, bound for Talcahuano. She was sailing off the coast of Chile when she struck on rocks in the late evening of 19 May. Overcast skies had prevented her from taking sightings since 17 May. The crew cut away her mizzen mast and the waves carried her over the rocks into calmer water. Pumping kept the water coming in from sinking her, but it was clear that she was lost. The morning revealed that she was low, a flat beach nearby. Over the next few days the crew used boats and rafts to evacuate Challenger, though some crew members died when their boats overturned in the surf. The crew were also able to salvage a considerable amount of her stores and to establish a camp. Local ranchers arrived and rendered assistance, while the assistant surgeon and clerk sought help at Concepción, Chile. From there Rouse, the British consul, took a party on horseback to assist. At the wreck, a crowd of Araucanian people gathered peaceably. Seymour was concerned that they could turn hostile, and the shore was unsuitable for ship access. The survivors abandoned their camp on 8 June and established a new camp at the mouth of the Lebu River, about 16 kilometres (10 mi) north. From there a party went overland to Concepción, about 64 kilometres (40 mi) away (as the crow flies). Their leader, Lieutenant Collins, found the town still in ruins after the earthquake in February. The only available boat was an overpriced sloop in poor condition, so he sent a message to the consulate in Valparaíso requesting help, then went back to the Lebu camp.

HMS Beagle, under captain Robert FitzRoy, was surveying the coast and about to leave Valparaíso on 14 June when an English merchant got a letter which mentioned the shipwreck. A Swedish ship had seen an "American big" in trouble near Mocha island. FitzRoy questioned them and next day, convinced it was Challenger captained by his friend, collected the mail for the British consulate. It was closed, but he got entry and saw dispatches about the wreck. He then went to Blonde with the message from Collins requesting help. Apparently Commodore Mason was reluctant to set off and risk the lee-shore in winter, so FitzRoy "had to bully him & at last offered to go as Pilot", agreed after "a tremendous quarrel" with hints the Commodore would face a court-martial.

They took Blonde south to Concepción, then FitzRoy took horse and a guide to Seymour's Lebu camp, returning to find that Mason had hired the overpriced sloop Carmen with its inexperienced local crew, and sent it off along with the Beagle's whaleboat. The sloop had sailed past the campsite by 28 June, when at FitzRoy's insistence Blonde set off. He too had difficulty finding the Lebu River, but they saw signal fires lit at the camp, and arrived on 5 July. With some difficulties, they got the survivors on board, as well as Rouse, whose servants and horses returned overland. Investigation revealed that a powerful current had pushed Challenger onshore at Molfguilla, FitzRoy later suggested that the earthquake had changed ocean current patterns. On the way back they rescued Carmen, which had become dismasted, and towed it and the whaleboat to Concepción. Challenger's captain and crew were returned to England from Coquimbo on 22 July by HMS Conway.
