= HMS Esk (1813) =

Cyrus-class ship-sloop

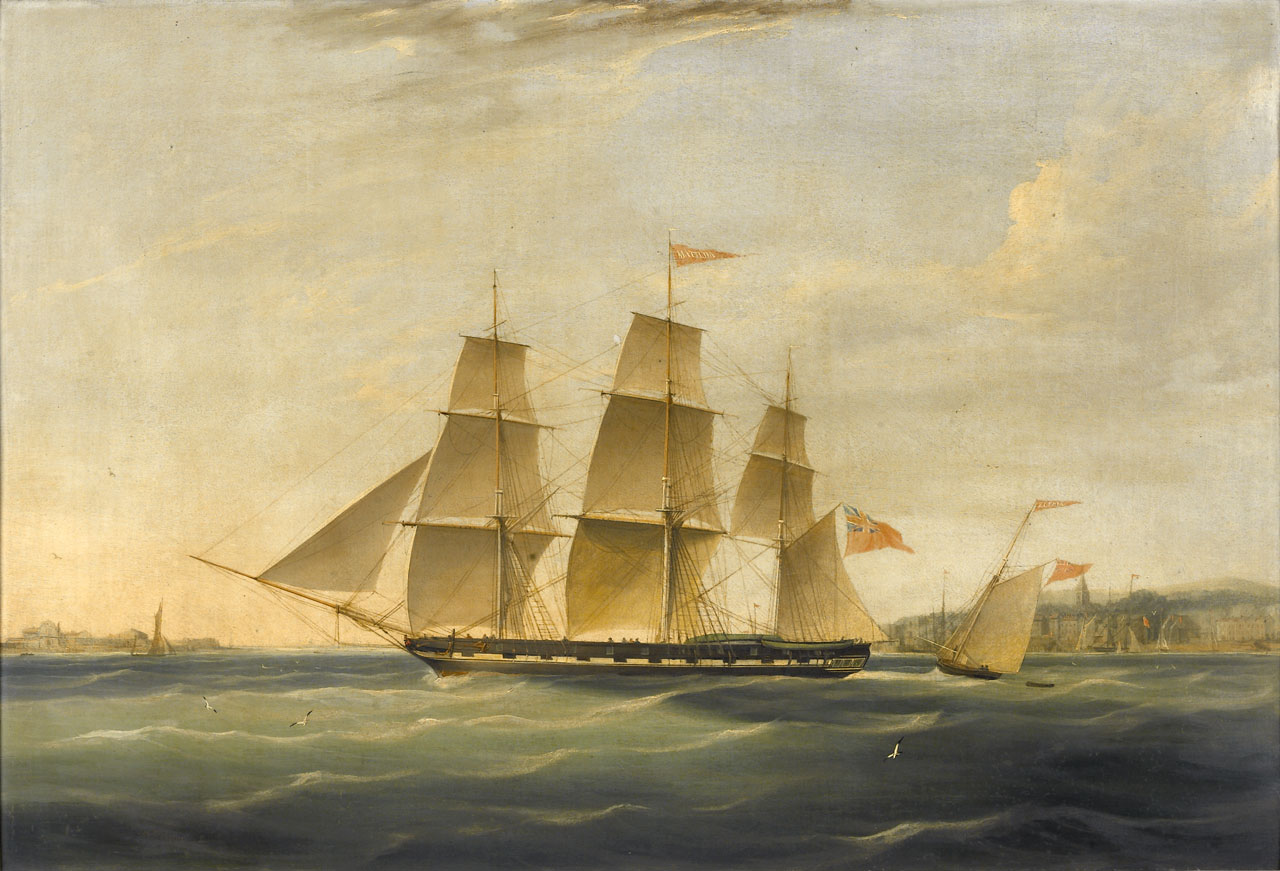
- The whaler Matilda off Tilbury Fort on her way to the South Seas whale fishery; James Miller Huggins (1807–1870). National Maritime Museum, Greenwich

History

United Kingdom
- Name: HMS Esk
- Namesake: River Esk
- Ordered: 18 November 1812
- Builder: Jabez Bayley, Ipswich
- Launched: 11 October 1813
- Fate: Sold 8 January 1829

United Kingdom
- Name: Matilda
- Acquired: 1829 by purchase
- Fate: Last listed 1844

General characteristics
- Tons burthen: 4577/94, or 458 (bm)
- Length: Overall:115 ft 7 5/8 in (35.25 m); Keel:97 ft 3 5/8 in (29.66 m)
- Beam: 29 ft 9 in (9.07 m)
- Depth of hold: 9 ft 6 in (2.90 m)
- Complement: 135
- Armament: 20 × 32-pounder carronades + 2 × 6-pounder chase guns

HMS Esk was a Cyrus-class ship-sloop launched at Ipswich in 1813. During the War of 1812 she captured one United States privateer, and fought an inconclusive action with another. Between 1825 and 1827 Esk was part of the West Africa Squadron, engaged in suppressing the trans-Atlantic slave trade, during which period she captured a number of slave ships. A prize she had taken also engaged in a notable single ship action. The Royal Navy sold Esk in 1829. Green, Wigram, and Green purchased her and between 1829 and 1845 she made four voyages in the British southern whale fishery as the whaler Matilda.

== Royal Navy ==
Commander George Augustus Lennock took command of Esk on 21 January 1814. She then served off the Canary Islands, and in the Channel and South America. Lennock was promoted to the rank of post-captain on 4 June 1814.

British sources report that off Teneriffe Esk engaged two American vessels, Grampus and Terpsichore. United States sources do not fully support this report. Grampus had a brief encounter with a vessel that Grampus mistook for a large merchantman and that turned out to be a sloop-of-war. after realizing her mistake Grampus fled, but not before receiving some broadsides that killed one man, left Captain John Murphy and another man mortally wounded, and several other men also wounded (Note: The action took place on 12 June 1814, or slightly before, as Grampus's first lieutenant, Thomas A. Bass, took command on that day.) (Note: The US account makes no mention of any vessel named Terpsichore. Also US sources such as Coggeshall or Kert show no vessel named Terpsichore among known US privateers and letters of marque.)

On 20 February 1815 Esk captured the United States privateer Sine-qua-non, of seven guns and 81 men. Sine-qua-non was under the command of Captain Abijah Luce. (Note: She was a schooner of 162 to 183 tons (bm). One source gave her burthen as 17385/95 tons and reported her alias as William. She had previously had a crew of 80–90 men but when commissioned 20 January 1815 had only declared 25 men. The Treaty of Ghent, ending the war, took effect in February. Prize money from the sale of Sine-qua-non was awarded to Esk's officers and crew in December 1815, but a Sine-qua-non was already sailing between New York and Gibraltar and Malaga by October 1815.) Lloyd's List reported in March 1815 that off Madeira Esk had captured a Boston privateer. The privateer had captured a vessel sailing from Havana to Liverpool, and had landed the crew at Madeira. (Note: This was the brig Antonia, of 180 tons (bm), that Sine-qua-non had captured on 31 January. Antonia arrived at Portsmouth, New Hampshire, on 9 March. Another source gave the name of the prize as Susannah. Susanna had been sailing under Spanish colours and the alias Antonio, but her English origins were discovered. Susannah, of 253 tons (bm), built in Spain in 1796, appeared in Lloyd's Register in 1816 with M.Mars, master, Hollan&Co, owners, and trade Liverpool–Cadiz. Her entry bore the annotation "capt".)

Lennock paid off Esk and recommissioned her in September 1815 for the Jamaica Station. Esk served on the Jamaica Station into 1817 and then was paid off in December 1818.

Between January and November 1820 Esk was at Portsmouth, undergoing some repairs and fitting for sea. Commander Edward Lloyd was appointed to Esk on 9 August 1820. He sailed for the Leeward Islands on 8 November.

During her time on station, Esk captured three smuggling vessels.

In March 1821, Esk was sailing between Margarita Island and the Spanish Main, when she struck on a bank of coral and hard sand near Point Avara. She was unable to get off for 48 hours until small vessels from Cumana came up. With their assistance Esk's guns and stores were removed. Once she was lightened she could be gotten off. Although she was only leaking slightly, she was brought into Antigua where it became clear that her keel needed repair. The need to heave down Esk exhausted the crew, with the result that all, officers, men, and boys, suffered from fever attacks. Hygiene measures were credited with only one man dying.

Esk then sailed to Bermuda to sit out the hurricane season and give commander and crew the opportunity to recuperate. Commander Lloyd was promoted to post-captain on 21 July 1821. He met with his replacement, Commander Arthur Lee Warner, and then returned to England at his own expense, being unwilling to wait for a naval vessel returning there.

Commander Warner took command of Esk on the Jamaica Station on 22 November 1821. Between May and July 1824 Esk was back at Chatham, undergoing repairs and fitting for sea.

In September 1824 Commander William Purchas commissioned Esk for the Africa Station. Between 17 July 1825 and 8 February 1827, Esk captured nine Brazilian, Dutch, and Spanish vessels, with 2249 slaves.

Esk arrived at Sierra Leone on 3 May 1825. She had stopped at the Gambia and Cape Verde acacia gum trade at Portendick.

On 17 July at 4°0′N 4°4′E Esk captured her first slave ship, the Brazilian sumacca Bom Jesus dos Navigantes, 82 1/2 tons (bm), Joao Pereiro, master, with 280 slaves on board. She was sent for adjudication to the British and Portuguese Court of Mixed Commission, Sierra Leone. On 13 August she was condemned. (Note: Sumacas were small two-masted vessels. Typically the two masts were differently rigged. They were common on the Brazilian coast but appeared also in the trans-Atlantic slave trade.) (Note: A first-class share of the bounty money for the slaves liberated from Bom Jesus dos Navigantes was worth £876 7s and 6 3/4d; a sixth-class share, that of an ordinary seaman, was worth £4 18s 5 1/4d.)

Under the terms of an agreement between Britain and Portugal, Brazilian ships could legally engage in the slave trade so long as they carried no more slaves than the number specified in their passport, and that they gathered their slaves around Angola and not in West Africa. Esk examined the papers of many vessels and only detained those Brazilian/Portuguese vessels in violation of their passports. Detained vessels were sent for adjudication by the British and Portuguese Court of Mixed Commission at Sierra Leone.

On 9 September 1825 Esk and Redwing were in company with Atholl when Atholl detained the Portuguese slave schooner Uniao, Jozé Ramos Gomis, master, at 2°23′N 4°17′E. Uniao had 361 slaves on board when detained; 112 died on the passage up to Sierra Leone. Uniao was sentenced on 21 October to be condemned.

On 4 March 1826, Esk detained at 5°43′N 5°25′E, in the River Benin the Brazilian slave sloop Esperanza, of 40 tons (bm), Joao Babtiste Lopez, master. Esperanza had four slaves on board. On 8 June 1826 she was sentenced to be condemned.

That same day Esk's boats went into the River Formosa at 5°N 5°E. There the boats captured the Brazilian brigantine Nettuno, of 75 tons (bm), Jozé Claudio Gomez, master, which was soon to sail for Pernambuco. Commander Purchas put a prize crew consisting of master's mate R. R. Crawford; the 16-year old master's assistant, Mr Finch, five seamen, and a 17-year old boy named Olivine on board Nettuno. Ninety-two slaves and four of the Portuguese crew, including Gomis, the former master were also on board.

As Nettuno sailed for Sierra Leone she came to be engaged in a notable single ship action.

On 20 March a large square-rigged vessel started to chase Nettuno, firing chase guns. When it became clear that the brig was not Redwing but rather a pirate brig of ten guns, Crawford shortened sail and had Nettuno's two 6-pounder carronades loaded. A boat from the brig came alongside, carrying the pirate brig's master and an interpreter. Crawford refused to give them permission to board. The master declared that his vessel was the Havana brig Caroline. When the master and the boat's bow man tried to board, Crawford shot them dead with two pistols he had retrieved from his cabin on the pretext of fetching Nettuno's papers; he then ordered the remaining men in the boat to jump overboard.

The pirate brig opened fire, which led most of the prize crew on Nettuno to run below decks. Crawford returned fire with the assistance of Olivine. A seaman name Frost took the helm and Gomis proceeded to bring up powder and shot for the guns. The action continued for two hours, with canister shot from Nettuno reportedly killing 20 of the pirates and wounding more. Nettuno was almost out of ammunition when a shot from the pirate killed a woman on the slave deck and wounded another, with a splinter wounding Crawford in the temple. Frost took over the gun and fired at a group of pirates on the brig's forecastle. The pirates then hauled off, permitting Nettuno to continue on to Sierra Leone unmolested. (Note: Crawford received a promotion to lieutenant, but was invalided home shortly thereafter. He returned to the West Africa Squadron five years later as captain of a brig.)

Nettuno landed 84 slaves. On 5 May 1826 she was sentenced to be condemned.

On 10 August Esk was at 2°8′N 6°20′E when she detained the Spanish schooner Intrepida, of 113 ton (bm), Francisco Reynaldo, master. She was armed with five 18-pounder guns, plus small arms. Intrepida was on her way from the River Bonny to Havana with 290 slaves on board when she was detained; 20 had died before she was detianed. Fifty-five of the slaves died on the way to Sierra Leone because of the over-crowding on what was a small vessel. At Sierra Leone the British and Spanish Mixed Court of Justice sentenced Intrepida to be condemned.

On 21 December Esk's boats went into the River Cameroons where they detained the Brazilian slave ship Invincival, of 163 tons (bm), J. Ac. de Castro Guimaraes, master, with 440 slaves on board. Lightning struck Invincival on 1 January 1827, and again on 30 January. The lightning killed a marine and four slaves. On the voyage to Sierra Leone, 190 slaves and one crew member died. The deaths were attributed to the lightning have damaged her masts with the result that the voyage took much longer than normal, to the filthy condition of the vessel, and illness among the Brazilian master and crew. On 20 February Invincival was sentenced to be condemned.

On 9 January Esk was at 2°20′N 6°00′E, off Prince's Island, when she detained the Netherlands slave brig Lynx, of 110 tons (bm), Peter Eugne Terrasse, master. She had 265 slaves on board, 14 of whom died on way to Sierra Leone. There the British and Netherlands Mixed Court of Justice, Sierra Leone condemned Lynx.

On 6 February Esk detained at 2°20′N 4°20′E, the Brazilian slave schooner Venus, of 133 tons (bm), J. Presa, master. She had 191 slaves on board, three of whom died on the way to Sierra Leone. On 15 March she was sentenced to be condemned.

On 8 February, Esk was at 1°12′N 8°20′E when she detained the Brazilian slave schooner Dos Amigos, late Zephyr, of 136 3/4 tons (bm), Jose Joaquim Ladislao, master. Dos Amigos had embarked 320 slaves, three of whom died before she was detained, and 12 of whom died on the passage up to Sierra Leone. She was sentenced on 19 March to be condemned.

By early 1828 worm damage to her bottom had caused Esk to become leaky. She therefore was caulked at Sierra Leone. She then sailed to Fernando Po. in company with the Commodore in early February. Lastly, she carried cows and ewes from St. Helen to the garrison at Ascension. She then sailed for England. She arrived at Spithead on 1 May 1828 with gold dust and ivory. Purchase was promoted to post captain 16 May.

Disposal: The "Principal Officers and Commissioners of His Majesty's Navy" offered "Esk, of 20 guns and 458 tons", lying at Chatham, for sale on 8 January 1829. She sold there on that day to William Wilson for £1,530.

== Whaler ==
Green, Wigram and Green acquired the vessel and named her Matilda.

1st whaling voyage (1829–1832): Captain Robert Pockley sailed from London on 16 September 1829, bound for the Japans grounds. She was reported on the Japans grounds, Honolulu, Pleasant Island, Guam, and the Moluccas, some of which she visited twice. Matilda returned to London via St Helena, arriving on 19 April 1832 with 570 casks of whale oil and 1,900 seal skins.

2nd whaling voyage (1829–1832): Captain William Tolley Brookes sailed from London on 3 August 1832, bound for Peru. Matilda was reported at Honolulu, Sydney, and the Sunda Strait. She returned on 17 May 1836 with 3100 barrels of oil.

3rd whaling voyage (1836–1840): Captain William Swain sailed from London on 21 October 1836, bound for the Pacific Ocean. She was reported at Honolulu and Bay of Islands. On her last visit to Bay of Islands, in January–February 1840 Swain deserted his ship. His first mate, J.Crighton, assumed command. He returned to England on 20 July 1840 with 175 casks of whale oil, two tuns of train oil, and 40 cwt whale bone.

4th whaling voyage (1841–1845): Captain Bliss sailed from London on 3 June 1841, bound for the New Zealand. Matilda was reported at Bay of Islands, Samoa, and the Kingsmill Islands.

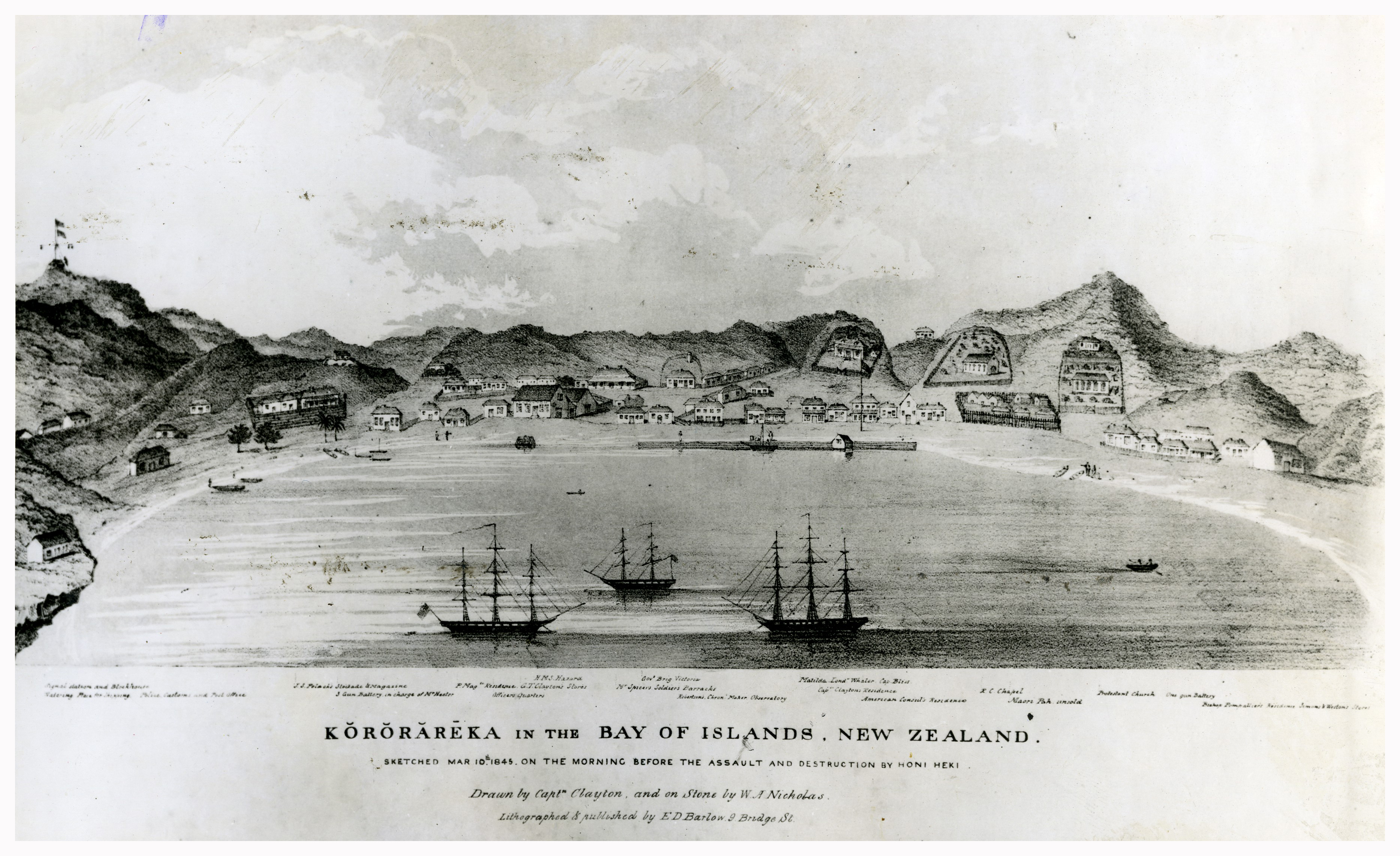
Kororareka (Russell) before the battle, 10 March 1845; Matilda is on the right

HMS Hazard was in the Bay of Islands on 11 March 1845 when a force of about 600 Māori armed with muskets, double-barrelled guns and tomahawks attacked Russell (now Kororareka. During the subsequent Battle of Kororareka the British were driven from Russell, with casualties on both sides; the British settlers took shelter on Hazard. A truce was declared and on the 10th or 12th, Matilda arrived. Captain Bliss went ashore with two civilians and spoke with the Māori, but while they were talking two cannon shots were fired from offshore; Bliss and his companions retreated and the Māori plundered and set fire to the town. In the evening of the 12th, HM Colonial brig Victoria departed for Auckland with urgent despatches and her share of refugee women and children. Most other refugees sailed for Auckland on 13 March in Hazard, Matilda, the schooner Dolphin, and the 21-gun USS St. Louis.

Matilda returned to London on 15 July 1845 with 116 tons of whale oil.

== Fate ==
The whaler Matilda no longer appears in ship arrival and departure data after 1844.
