= HMS Carlotta (1812) =

Brig of the Royal Navy

The origins of HMS Carlotta are obscure. In January 1812, Admiral Edward Pellew appointed Lieutenant Richard Howell Fleming to command Pyllades, later renamed Carlotta.

Some sources treat this Carlotta as the salvaged Carlotta. However, the database of the National Maritime Museum (NMM) treats them as two vessels. Currently available online resources do not yield information on Pylades, or her capture or other origin. There were apparently no French naval vessels of that name, suggesting that she was a merchant vessel. Furthermore, the NMM database allocates the capture of the brig Carlotta to HMS Carlotta captured in 1810, and Pylades to the second HMS Carlotta. If the Royal Navy captured or otherwise acquired Pylades shortly before the first Carlotta was wrecked, it would be consistent with Navy practice to name Pylades Carlotta as there was already an Pylades on active duty.

Under Fleming's command Carlotta captured several small vessels, including a French privateer, and partook of various services on the coasts of Tuscany and Genoa. Carlotta shared in the proceeds from the capture on 24 May 1813 of the privateer Columbo, which may be the privateer alluded to. The actual captors appear to have been Nautilus and Redwing. (Note: Carlotta did not share in the head-money for the capture. Furthermore, because her captain was a lieutenant, and the captains of the other two vessels were commanders, Fleming was only entitled to a second-class share, while the other two were entitled to first-class shares. Fleming's second-class share was worth £8 15s 1¼d; a sixth-class share, that of an ordinary seaman, was worth 5s 10½d. A first-class share to Nautilus and Redwing was worth £27 6s 2½d; a sixth-class share was worth 7s 6½d.)

On 13 October 1812 Carlotta detained the settee St Vittoria and put a prize crew consisting of Midshipman Hugh Stewart Morris and two sailors, Francis Baynson and François Richie, on board with instructions that they were to sail her in company with Carlotta to Malta. However, on 19 October, St Vittoria went her own way, stopping first at Port St Vito and then to sailing on to Palermo. There Morris sold part of her cargo. After spending almost three weeks at Palermo, Stewart sailed to Cephalu where he disposed of the rest of the cargo. Then he scuttled St Vittoria, but sold the wreck for 373 ounces of gold to a man named "Fellipo". Morris, Baynson, and Richie split the proceeds and made their way to Messina. However, Lieutenant-colonel Coffin, the deputy quartermaster general at Messina, arrested them as they were about to take a boat to Calabria, and sent them to Malta. A court martial convened at Port Mahon aboard Hibernia on 8 and 9 April 1813 sentenced all three miscreants to be mulcted of all outstanding pay and prize money. It also sentenced Morris to two years of solitary confinement, after which he could never serve as a petty officer or officer in the Navy. Baynson was sentenced to 200 lashes. Richie was an impressed Frenchman and the court martial ruled that he was to be treated as a prisoner of war.

Carlotta was paid off in February 1815 and broken up in May at Pater (Pembroke Dock).

== Notes, citations, and references ==
Notes

Citations

References

- O’Byrne, William R. (1849) A naval biographical dictionary: comprising the life and services of every living officer in Her Majesty's navy, from the rank of admiral of the fleet to that of lieutenant, inclusive. (London: J. Murray), vol. 1.
- Winfield, Rif (2008). British Warships in the Age of Sail 1793–1817: Design, Construction, Careers and Fates. Seaforth. ISBN 1-86176-246-1.
