= HMS Pallas (1816) =

Royal Navy fifth-rate frigate

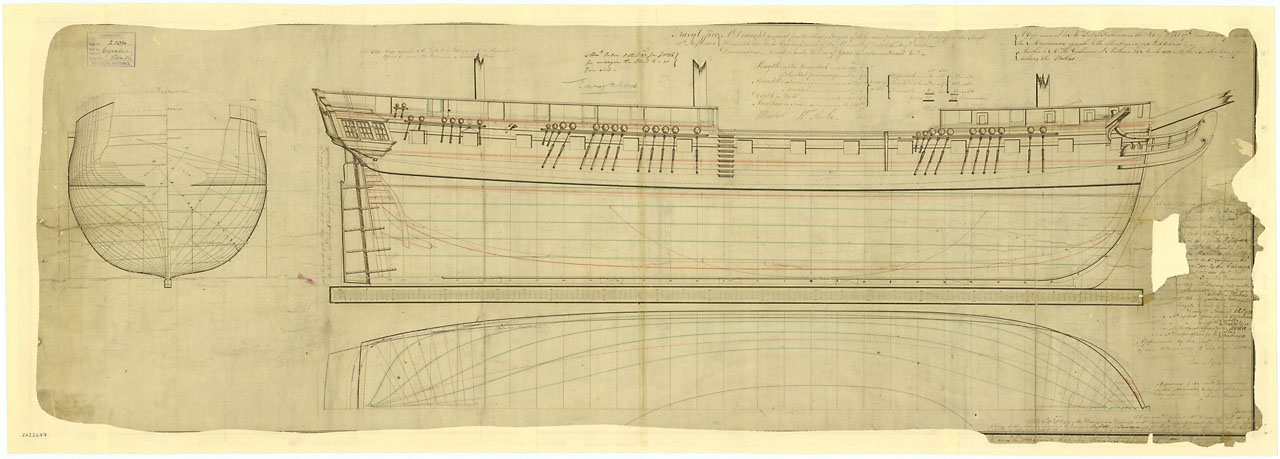
- 1803 plan of the Apollo class

History

United Kingdom
- Name: Pallas
- Namesake: Athena
- Ordered: 19 March 1811; 10 December 1813 (re-order)
- Builder: Guillaume, Northam; Diddams, Portsmouth (re-order)
- Laid down: May 1811; May 1814 (re-order)
- Launched: 13 April 1816
- Completed: 27 April 1816
- Commissioned: August 1828
- Fate: Sold, 11 January 1862

General characteristics
- Class & type: Fifth-rate Apollo-class frigate
- Tons burthen: 95113/94 (bm)
- Length: 145 ft 5 in (44.3 m) (upper deck); 122 ft 2 5/8 in (37.3 m) (keel)
- Beam: 38 ft 3 in (11.7 m)
- Draught: 10 ft 8 in (3.3 m) (forward); 14 ft 5 in (4.4 m) (aft)
- Depth of hold: 13 ft 3 in (4.0 m)
- Propulsion: Sails
- Complement: 264
- Armament: UD: 26 × 18-pounder guns; QD: 2 × 9-pounder guns + 10 × 32-pounder carronades; Fc: 2 × 9-pounder guns + 4 × 32-pounder carronades

HMS Pallas was a 36-gun fifth-rate Apollo-class frigate of the Royal Navy. Placed in ordinary when completed in 1816, Pallas was commissioned for the first time in 1828. Under Captain Adolphus FitzClarence the frigate spent time blockading the Azores before making trips to India and then Nova Scotia, conveying important passengers. The ship sailed to the Mediterranean in 1830 under the command of Captain Manley Hall Dixon, and returned early the following year with the survivors of the wreck of the Countess of Harcourt. Later in the year Pallas joined the West Indies Station, where she served until 1834 when she was paid off. In 1836 the frigate was converted into a coal hulk, in which role she served at Plymouth Dockyard until being sold in 1862.

== Design ==
Pallas was a 36-gun, 18-pounder Apollo-class frigate. Designed by Surveyor of the Navy Sir William Rule, the Apollo class originally consisted of three ships constructed between 1798 and 1803. The class formed part of the Royal Navy's response to the French Revolutionary Wars and need for more warships to serve in it. The original Apollo design was then revived at the start of the Napoleonic Wars in 1803, with twenty-four ships ordered to it over the next nine years. This order came about as the threat from the French fleet against Britain began to dissipate, especially after the Battle of Trafalgar in 1805. The Royal Navy stopped ordering specifically large and offensively capable warships, and instead focused on standardised classes of ships that were usually more moderate in size, but through larger numbers would be able to effectively combat the expected increase in global economic warfare.

The Apollo class became the standard frigate design for this task, alongside the Vengeur-class ship of the line and Cruizer-class brig-sloop. The Apollo class was chosen to fulfil the role of standardised frigate because of how well the lone surviving ship of the first batch, HMS Euryalus, had performed, providing "all-round excellence" according to naval historian Robert Gardiner. Trials of ships of the class showed that they were all capable of reaching around 12 knots (22 km/h) and were very well balanced, although prone to pitching deeply in heavy seas. They also had a high storage capacity, allowing for upwards of six months' provisions. The biggest drawback of the class was that after about six weeks of service, when stores had been used up and the ships were riding higher in the water, the ships became far less weatherly.

== Construction ==
In this second batch of Apollo-class frigates, half were ordered to be built at commercial shipyards and half at Royal Navy Dockyards. Pallas, in the former group of ships, was ordered on 19 March 1811 to be built by shipwright Robert Guillaume at Northam, Southampton. She was the twentieth frigate to be ordered to the renewed design.

Pallas was laid down in May the same year, but Guillaume then went bankrupt. The order for Pallas was re-issued, with Gardiner dating this to 1 December 1811 and the naval historian Rif Winfield dating it to 10 December 1813, and given to Portsmouth Dockyard, under the control of Nicholas Diddams. Pallas was laid down for a second time in April 1814, and launched on 13 April 1816 with the following dimensions: 145 feet 5 inches (44.3 m) along the upper deck, 122 feet 2 5/8 inches (37.3 m) at the keel, with a beam of 38 feet 3 inches (11.7 m) and a depth in the hold of 13 feet 3 inches (4.0 m). The ship had a draught of 10 feet 8 inches (3.3 m) forward and 14 feet 5 inches (4.4 m) aft, and measured 95113/94 tons burthen. She was named after the goddess Athena, who also went by Pallas, with the Royal Navy's use of the name dating back to 1757.

Pallas was launched at the same time as the 74-gun ship of the line HMS Pitt, also built by Diddams. Captain Sir George Grey christened Pallas at the launch. The fitting out process for Pallas was completed on 27 April, also at Portsmouth. With a crew complement of 264, the frigate held twenty-six 18-pounder long guns on her upper deck. Complementing this armament were ten 32-pounder carronades and two 9-pounder long guns on the quarterdeck, with an additional two 9-pounder long guns and four 32-pounder carronades on the forecastle. The ship had cost £34,668 to construct, with a further £2,200 going to Guillaume prior to his bankruptcy.

== Service ==
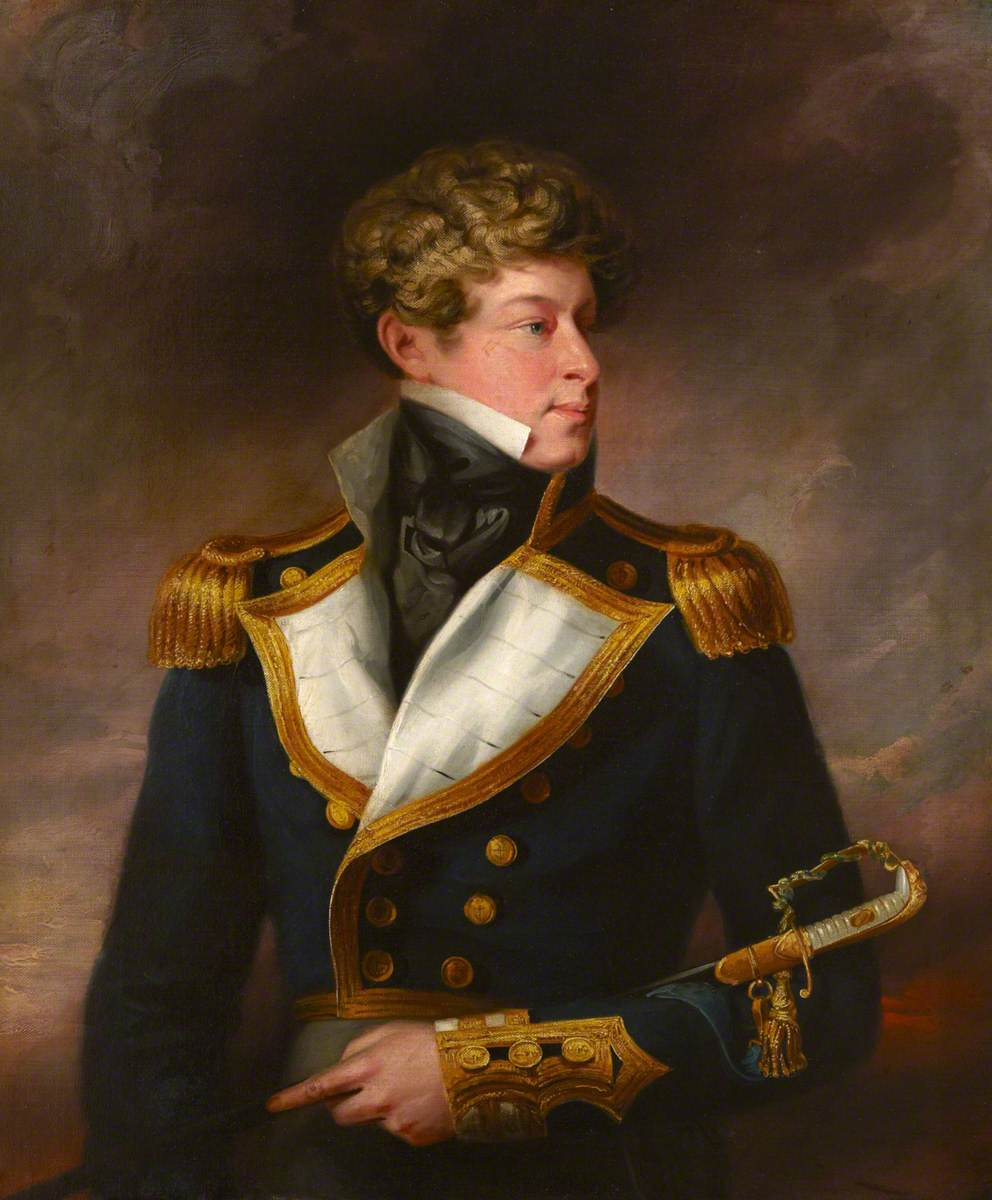
Pallas's first captain, Adolphus FitzClarence

Pallas was placed in ordinary after being completed, the Napoleonic Wars having ended. She continued in this manner until 28 August 1828 when she was commissioned for the first time under the command of Captain Adolphus FitzClarence. The frigate was fitted for sea service at Portsmouth between October and December, at the cost of £15,472. At this time the Liberal Wars were beginning in Portugal, and some of the military Liberals had taken refuge in Britain. From British ports they then sailed to capture the Azores from the Miguelists. Pallas was assigned as lead ship of a squadron sent to the Azores to stop the Liberals from succeeding in this plan, sailing on 16 December. FitzClarence, as senior officer, instituted a blockade of the Azores, staying there until February 1829 when Pallas returned to Britain. Upon his return FitzClarence had to write rebuttals to the Admiralty after two reports were published in newspapers, saying that he had let an American ship through the blockade to land 300 Portuguese soldiers, and that he and three of Pallas's crew had been wounded in a skirmish over watering agreements with the Portuguese. FitzClarence argued that both reports were exaggerated.

Pallas was next assigned to convey Lieutenant-General George Ramsay, 9th Earl of Dalhousie and his wife to Calcutta, as Dalhousie had been appointed the new Commander-in-Chief, India. Also on board was John Turner, the Anglican Bishop of Calcutta. The ship departed on 20 July, first stopping at Madeira, Rio de Janeiro, and then the Cape of Good Hope where she landed £35,000 of silver coin. Pallas arrived at Calcutta on 9 December. The frigate stayed in India for a month before embarking the retiring Commander-in-Chief, General Stapleton Cotton, 1st Viscount Combermere, for the return journey. The initial leg of this required a steamship to pull Pallas out of the Hooghly River. The ship made several stops on the return journey, calling at the Cape, St Helena, and Ascension Island. During the journey several animals were taken on board, including turtles, antelopes, a cheetah, elk, Angora goat, and Bengal tiger, the latter of which was tame enough to walk freely around Pallas's deck.

The frigate arrived at Spithead on 30 April 1830, having lost none of her crew to sickness during the ten-month voyage. Pallas was then sent to Nova Scotia in July, tasked with conveying FitzClarence's sister Mary Fox and her husband Lieutenant-Colonel Charles Richard Fox back to Britain. The ship returned to Britain with the Fox family on 8 September, and FitzClarence relinquished command the next day.

Captain Manley Hall Dixon took command of Pallas on 16 September, sailing the ship to her new station at Plymouth. She sailed to the Mediterranean on 7 December to replace the 46-gun frigate HMS Madagascar on station. Pallas sailed from Malta on 2 February 1831 carrying on board 235 survivors from the 90th Regiment of Foot who had been wrecked in the transport ship Countess of Harcourt. On 8 February a virulent but non-fatal fever broke out on the frigate, being caught by 100 members of the crew and 36 of the soldiers. Pallas anchored off Gibraltar on 12 February and was quarantined before leaving for Britain on 16 February, during which journey the fever subsided. She arrived at Portsmouth on 2 March and was again quarantined, before being finally allowed to disembark her passengers two days later at Spithead.

Pallas subsequently joined the West Indies Station, having arrived at Bermuda by 1 October. She was still serving there on 20 January 1832 when Captain William Walpole took over command. Pallas moved from Barbados to Jamaica in July 1833, with Walpole become the senior naval officer at the latter island. In early 1834 Pallas was relieved on the West Indies Station by the 42-gun frigate HMS Belvidera; on 15 March Walpole sailed Pallas from Port Royal, conveying the prior Governor of Jamaica, Constantine Phipps, 2nd Earl of Mulgrave, back to Britain. They arrived at Portsmouth on 24 April. The ship was then paid off on 16 May. Early in 1836 the ship was hulked at Portsmouth, before being converted into a coal depot at Plymouth Dockyard between September and November. Pallas served as a coal depot for the next twenty-four years, being retired in 1860. She was sold for £1,426 to Marshall on 11 January 1862.
