= HMY Royal George =

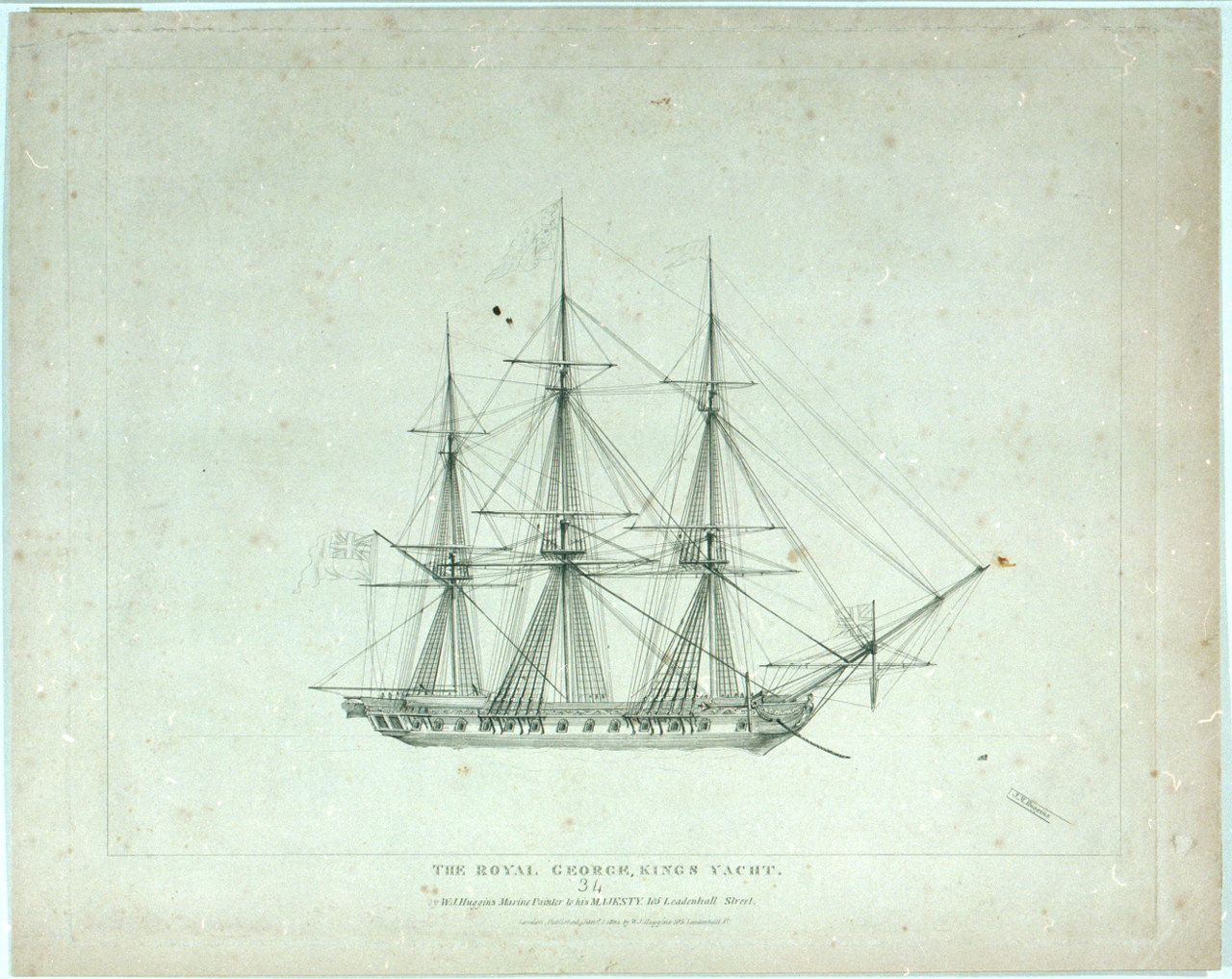
- HMY Royal George by William John Huggins

History

United Kingdom
- Name: HMY Royal George
- Namesake: King George III
- Builder: Deptford Dockyard
- Launched: 17 July 1817
- Fate: Broken up 1905

General characteristics
- Type: Royal Yacht
- Tons burthen: 330 tons bm
- Length: 103 ft (31.4 m) (deck); 88 ft 5 in (26.9 m) (keel)
- Beam: 26 ft 6 in (8.1 m)
- Depth of hold: 11 ft 6 in (3.5 m)
- Complement: 67
- Armament: 8 brass swivels

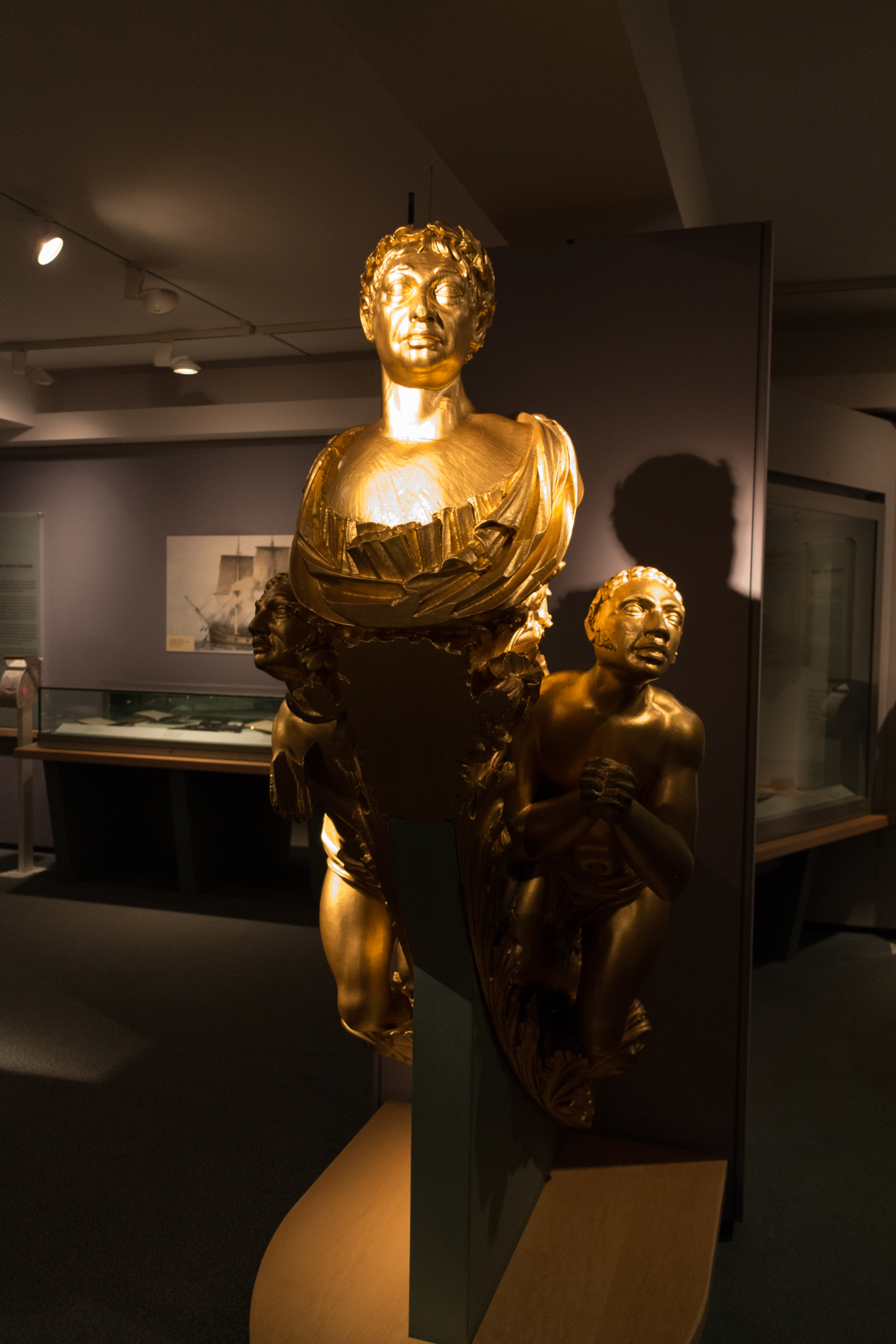
Figurehead of HMY Royal George, on display at the National Maritime Museum

HMY Royal George was a Royal Yacht of the Royal Navy of the United Kingdom, launched 1817, and last used in 1842. She became an accommodation hulk in 1902, and was broken up in 1905. Gilded dolphins and rope ornament from the yacht were reused as decoration in the principal bedroom of Adelaide Cottage in Home Park Windsor.

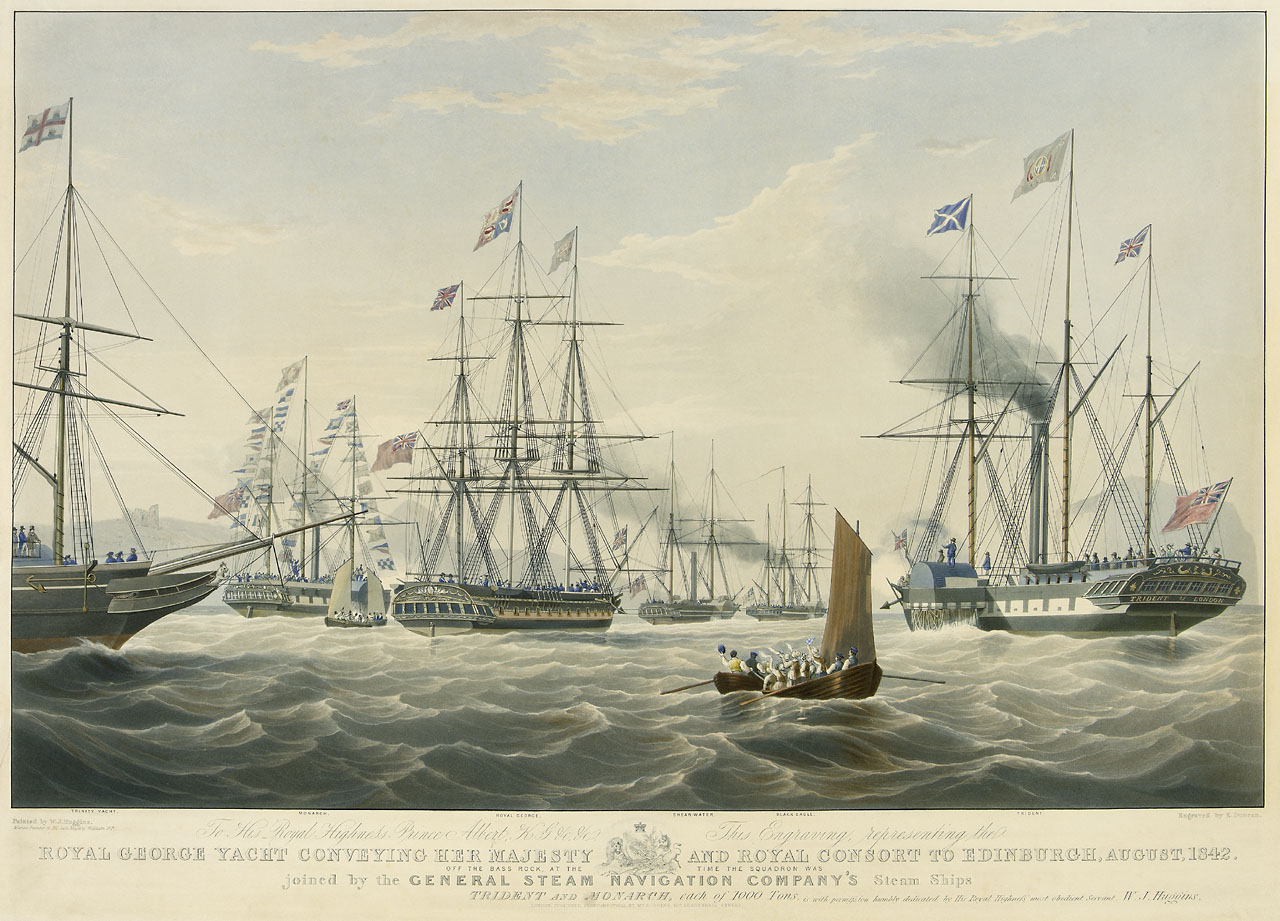
The Royal George Yacht conveying her Majesty and Royal Consort to Edinburgh, August, 1842 Off the Bass Rock - joined by General Steam Navigation - Ships Trident and Monarch
