= Manley Hall Dixon =

Royal Navy Admiral (1786–1864)

Admiral Manley Hall Dixon
- Born: 8 June 1786; Stoke, Devon
- Died: 3 March 1864 (aged 77)
- Military career
- Allegiance: United Kingdom
- Branch: Royal Navy
- Service years: 1794–1855
- Rank: Admiral
- Commands: HMS Vigo; HMS Montagu; HMS Nereus; HMS Pallas; HMS Caledonia; Queenstown
- Conflicts: French Revolutionary Wars; Napoleonic Wars

Admiral Manley Hall Dixon (8 June 1786 – 3 March 1864) was a Royal Navy officer who became Commander-in-Chief, Queenstown.

== Naval career ==
Born the son of Admiral Sir Manley Dixon, Dixon joined the Royal Navy in 1794 and took part in the action of 15 July 1798 and the Siege of Malta during the French Revolutionary Wars before seeking action again during the Napoleonic Wars. He became commanding officer of the third-rate HMS Vigo in 1811, commanding officer of the third-rate HMS Montagu in 1812 and commanding officer of the frigate HMS Nereus in 1813. He went on to be commanding officer of the fifth-rate HMS Pallas in 1831, commanding officer the first-rate HMS Caledonia in 1845 and Commander-in-Chief, Queenstown in 1850 before retiring in 1855.

== Family ==
In 1815 he married Harriet, second daughter of William Foot, of Devonport.

Military offices
Preceded by Donald Mackay	Commander-in-Chief, Queenstown; 1850–1855	Succeeded by John Purvis
