= Portrait of William IV =

Portrait of William IV may refer to:

- Portrait of William IV (Wilkie), an 1832 painting
- Portrait of William IV (Archer Shee), an 1833 painting
