= Portrait of William IV (Wilkie) =

Painting by David Wilkie

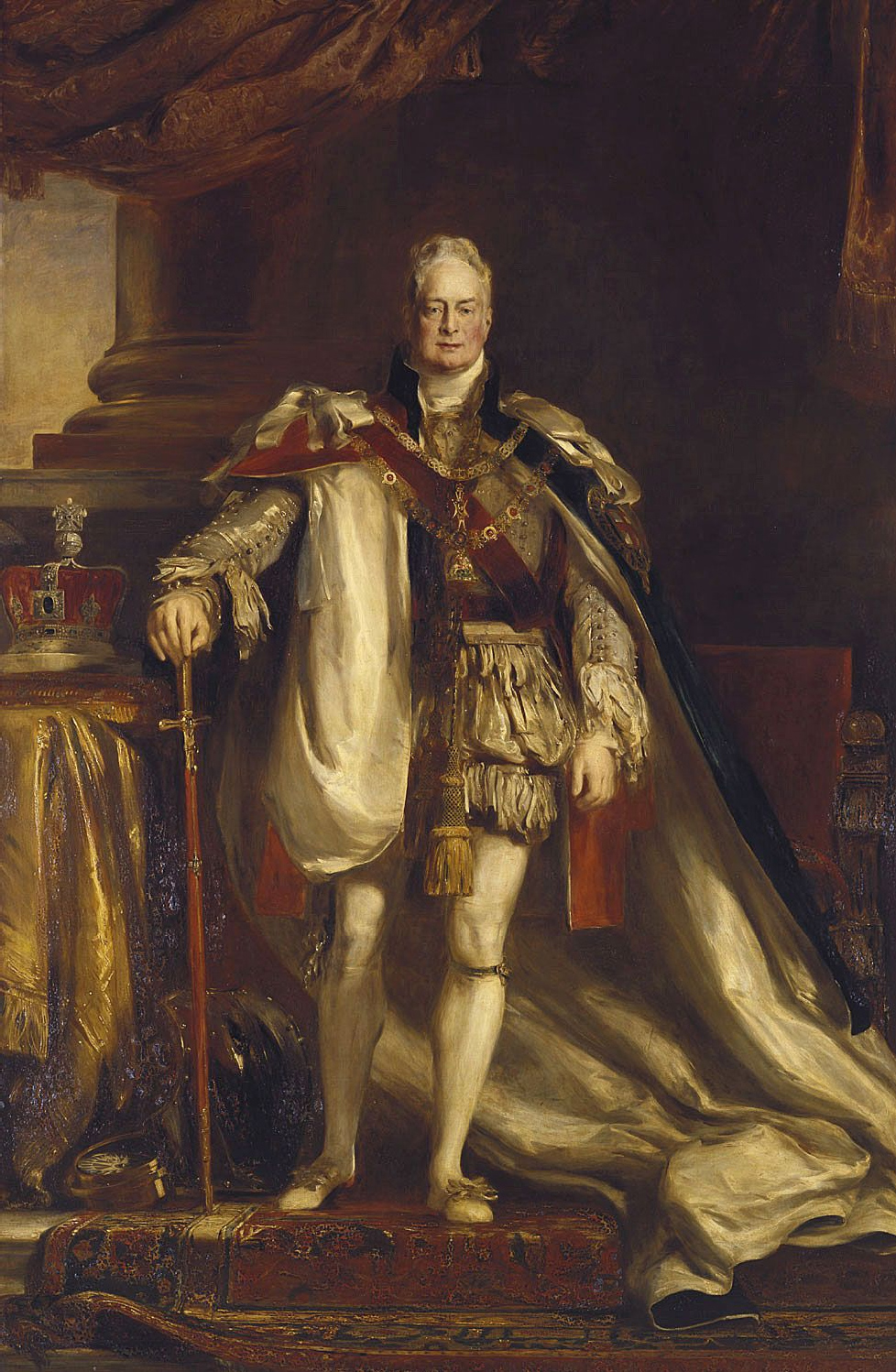
- Artist: David Wilkie
- Year: 1832
- Type: Oil on canvas, portrait
- Dimensions: 270 cm × 178.4 cm (110 in × 70.2 in)
- Location: Windsor Castle

Portrait of William IV is an 1832 portrait painting by the Scottish artist David Wilkie. It is a depiction of the reigning British monarch William IV, who had come to the throne two years earlier. Wilkie was Principal Painter in Ordinary to the king and produced this full-length work showing William in his garter robes with St Edward's Crown beside him. Wilkie was a great admirer of Old Masters and the presentation of the king echoes that of Hans Holbein's Portrait of Henry VIII.

It was exhibited at the Royal Academy's Summer Exhibition of 1832 at Somerset House. It hangs in the Waterloo Chamber at Windsor Castle alongside the many paintings by Thomas Lawrence of the European leaders at the time of the defeat of Napoleon.

== See also ==
- Portrait of William IV, an 1833 portrait by the Irish artist Martin Archer Shee
- George IV in Highland Dress, an 1829 portrait by Wilkie of the king's elder brother

== Bibliography ==
- Herrmann, Luke. Nineteenth Century British Painting. Charles de la Mare, 2000.
- Ormond, Richard, The Face of Monarchy: British Royalty Portrayed. Phaidon, 1977.
- Tromans, Nicholas. David Wilkie: The People's Painter. Edinburgh University Press, 2007.
- Van Der Kiste, John. William IV: The Last Hanoverian King of Britain. Pen and Sword History, 2022.
