= Portrait of the Duke of Clarence =

Painting by Martin Archer Shee

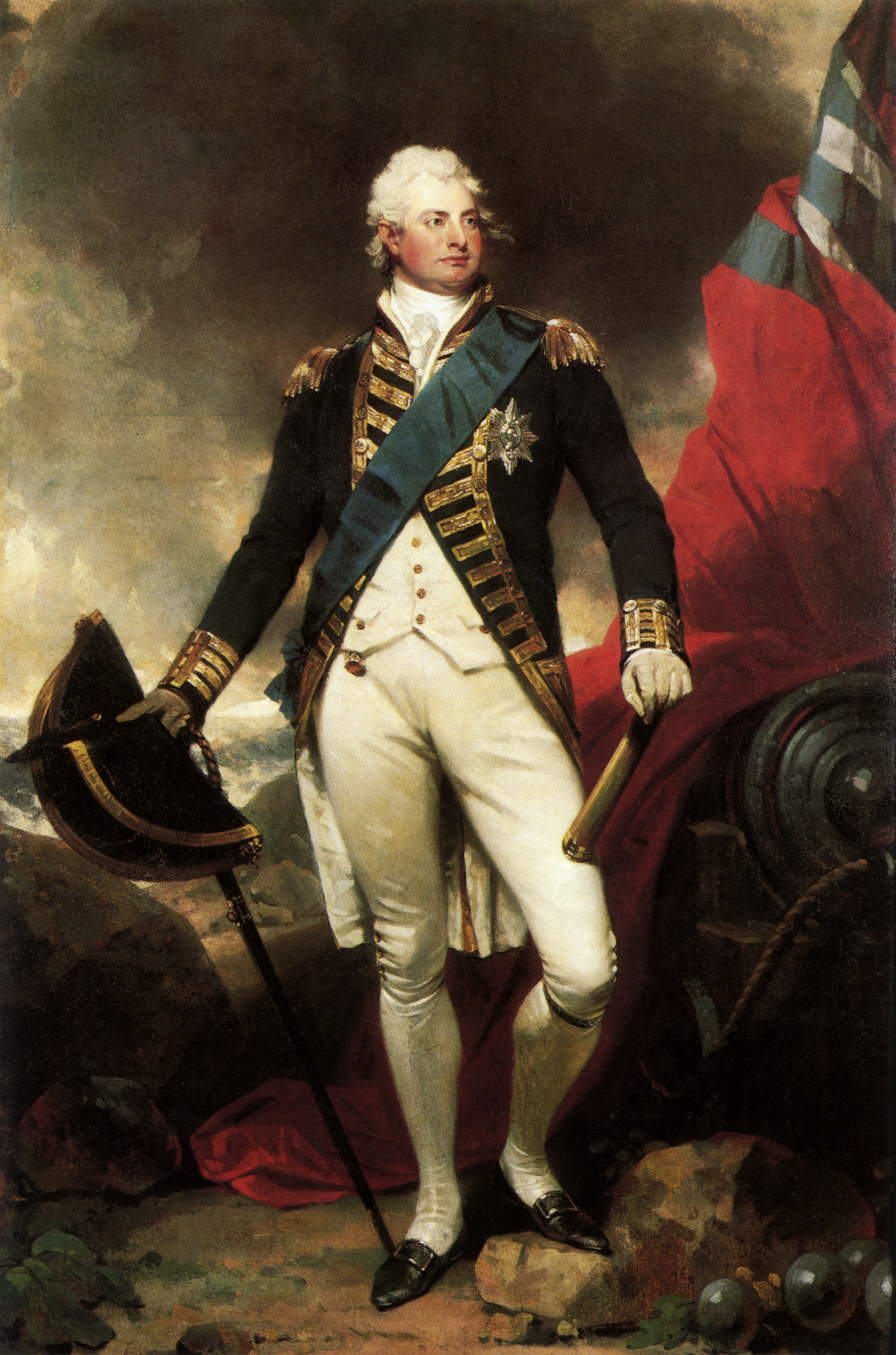
- Artist: Martin Archer Shee
- Year: c. 1800
- Type: Oil on canvas, portrait
- Dimensions: 221 cm × 149.9 cm (87 in × 59.0 in)
- Location: National Portrait Gallery, London

Portrait of the Duke of Clarence is a portrait painting by the Irish artist Martin Archer Shee, from c. 1800. It depicts the future William IV, then Duke of Clarence.

== History and description ==
The third son of George III, Clarence was not considered likely to inherit the throne and joined the Royal Navy. He is shown in the full dress uniform of an admiral, wearing the Order of the Garter. After the death of his elder brother George IV in 1830, William succeeded to the throne. Archer Shee was President of the Royal Academy during William's reign, following Thomas Lawrence in the post. He also painted William while he was king.

Today the work is in the collection of the National Portrait Gallery in London, which acquired it in 1928. Archer Shee also produced a near contemporary painting of Clarence in the robes of a peer which he exhibited at the Royal Academy's Summer Exhibition in 1800, which is now in the collection of the Walker Art Gallery in Liverpool.

== See also ==
- Dorothea Jordan as Hippolyta, portrait of his long-standing partner Dorothea Jordan by John Hoppner
- Portrait of William IV, 1833 portrait by Archer Shee of William as monarch

== Bibliography ==
- Black, Jeremy. The Hanoverians: The History of a Dynasty. A&C Black, 2007.
- Hermann, Like. Nineteenth Century British Painting. Charles de la Mare, 2000.
- Van Der Kiste, John. William IV: The Last Hanoverian King of Britain. Pen and Sword History, 2022.
