= Portrait of William IV (Archer Shee) =

Painting by Martin Archer Shee

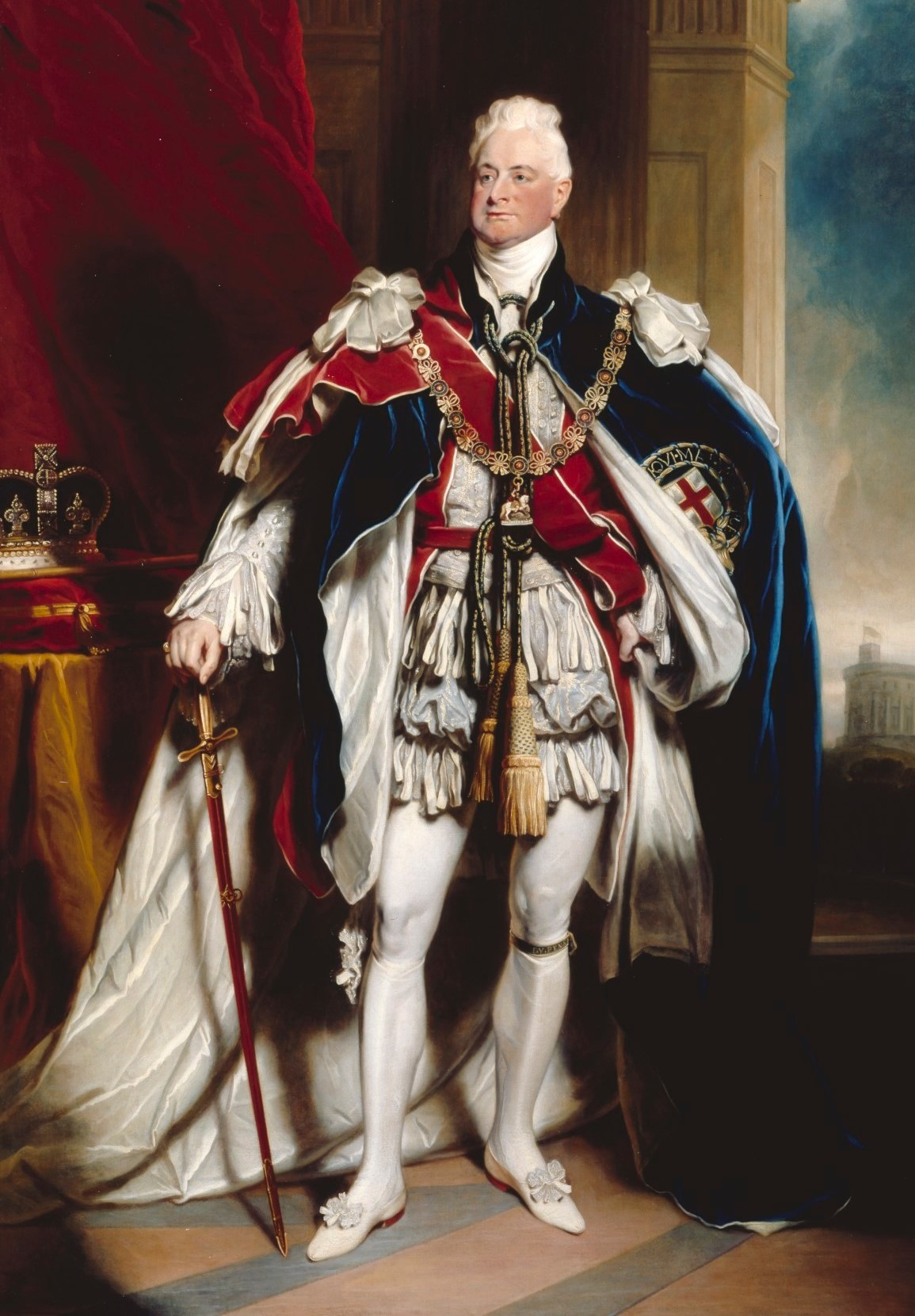
- Artist: Martin Archer Shee
- Year: 1833
- Type: Oil on canvas, portrait
- Dimensions: 270.3 cm × 179 cm (106.4 in × 70 in)
- Location: Windsor Castle, Windsor

Portrait of William IV is a portrait painting by the Irish artist Sir Martin Archer Shee, from 1833. It depicts William IV.

== History and description ==
Shee had succeeded Thomas Lawrence as President of the Royal Academy in 1830. He had painted William a number of times over the decades, most notably in his 1800 Portrait of the Duke of Clarence, at a time when William as third son of George III was considered unlikely to succeed to the throne. Following the death of his elder brother George IV, William became king in 1830, reigning for seven years. He was himself succeeded by his eighteen-year-old niece Queen Victoria in 1837.

The portrait shows William IV in his robes as a member of the Order of the Garter, with Windsor Castle in the background. His hand rests on the hilt of a sword with the St Edward's Crown and sceptre on a cushion. Originally the King intended to send the painting to the Anglo-Irish politician Richard, Marquess Wellesley, who was then serving as Lord Lieutenant of Ireland. Impressed by it, he chose instead to keep it to hang in the Throne Room at Windsor Castle. The picture was displayed at the Royal Academy Exhibition of 1834 at Somerset House. It remains in the Royal Collection.

== See also ==
- Portrait of William IV, a portrait of 1832 by the Scottish artist David Wilkie hanging in the Waterloo Chamber at Windsor Castle
- Portrait of Queen Adelaide, an 1836 portrait of his the king's wife by Archer Shee

== Bibliography ==
- Lambourne, Lionel. Victorian Painting. Phaidon, 1999.
- Ormond, Richard, The Face of Monarchy: British Royalty Portrayed. Phaidon, 1977.
- Van Der Kiste, John. William IV: The Last Hanoverian King of Britain. Pen and Sword History, 2022.

== See also ==
- Media related to Portrait of William IV (Martin Archer Shee - Royal Collection, RCIN 404385) at Wikimedia Commons
