= 1985 Galway Corporation election =

Part of the 1985 Irish local elections

- 20 June 1985

All 15 seats on Galway City Council
| | First party | Second party | Third party |
|---|---|---|---|
| Party | Fianna Fáil | Fine Gael | Workers' Party |
| Seats won | 6 | 5 | 2 |
| Seat change | ▲1 | ▲4 | ▲2 |
| | Fourth party | Fifth party |
| Party | Labour | Independent |
| Seats won | 1 | 1 |
| Seat change | Steady | ▼4 |
- Map showing the area of Galway City Council

An election for all 15 seats on Galway Borough Council took place on 20 June 1985 as part of the 1985 Irish local elections. This was an increase of three seats from the previous election. Councillors were elected for a five-year term of office from 3 local electoral areas (LEAs) on the electoral system of proportional representation by means of the single transferable vote (PR-STV).

On 1 January 1986, the borough of Galway became a county borough, detached from County Galway. Galway City Council was a successor to the borough council, with all members continuing in office as city councillors.

The term of office was extended for a further year, with the 1991 Galway Corporation election taking place as part of the 1991 Irish local elections.

== Results by party ==
| Party | Seats | ± | First Pref. votes | FPv% | ±% |
|---|---|---|---|---|---|
| Fianna Fáil | 6 | ▲1 | 5,985 | 40.59 | |
| Fine Gael | 5 | ▲4 | 4,283 | 29.05 | |
| Workers' Party | 2 | ▲2 | 1,323 | 8.97 | |
| Labour | 1 | Steady | 1,597 | 10.83 | |
| Independent | 1 | ▼4 | 1,556 | 10.55 | |
| Total | 15 | ▲3 | 14,744 | 100.00 | — |

== Results by local electoral area ==
=== North & East Ward ===
North & East Ward: 7 seats
| Party | Candidate | FPv% | Count | | | | | | | | | | | | | |
| Party | Candidate | FPv% | 1 | 2 | 3 | 4 | 5 | 6 | 7 | 8 | 9 | 10 | 11 | 12 | 13 | 14 |
|---|---|---|---|---|---|---|---|---|---|---|---|---|---|---|---|---|
| Fianna Fáil | Bridie O'Flaherty* | | 869 | | | | | | | | | | | | | |
| Fianna Fáil | Máire Geoghegan-Quinn TD | | 808 | 816 | 822 | 848 | | | | | | | | | | |
| Fianna Fáil | Michael Leahy | | 796 | 806 | 812 | 855 | | | | | | | | | | |
| Fine Gael | Fintan Coogan | | 735 | 737 | 743 | 749 | 753 | 754 | 770 | 870 | | | | | | |
| Fine Gael | Pádraic McCormack | | 486 | 487 | 489 | 492 | 492 | 492 | 497 | 523 | 545 | 559 | 595 | 673 | 884 | |
| Fianna Fáil | Henry O'Connor* | | 420 | 427 | 433 | 453 | 472 | 484 | 494 | 500 | 501 | 540 | 601 | 626 | 662 | 671 |
| Workers' Party | Liz Hackett | | 412 | 413 | 425 | 431 | 431 | 431 | 461 | 482 | 484 | 542 | 589 | 709 | 744 | 754 |
| Fine Gael | Pascal Walsh | | 328 | 330 | 331 | 336 | 336 | 336 | 358 | 396 | 403 | 424 | 449 | 487 | | |
| Independent | Brendan Holland* | | 317 | 318 | 323 | 327 | 327 | 329 | 339 | 353 | 359 | 410 | 541 | 589 | 660 | 698 |
| Independent | John Francis King* | | 282 | 284 | 303 | 307 | 309 | 309 | 328 | 334 | 336 | 378 | | | | |
| Labour | Peter Kenny | | 271 | 271 | 293 | 295 | 295 | 296 | 379 | 390 | 392 | 396 | 420 | | | |
| Independent | Sheila Jordan | | 224 | 225 | 230 | 234 | 236 | 237 | | | | | | | | |
| Fine Gael | Marie Dennis | | 219 | 221 | 225 | 228 | 229 | 230 | 241 | | | | | | | |
| Labour | Pat O'Sullivan | | 199 | 201 | 225 | 225 | 225 | 225 | | | | | | | | |
| Fianna Fáil | Uiris O Ceadegh | | 125 | 127 | 128 | | | | | | | | | | | |
| Labour | Paddy Naughton | | 120 | 121 | | | | | | | | | | | | |
Electorate: 15,706 Valid: 6,611 (42.51%) Spoilt: 65 Quota: 827 Turnout: 6,676

=== South Ward ===
South Ward: 3 seats
| Party | Candidate | FPv% | Count | | | | | | |
| Party | Candidate | FPv% | 1 | 2 | 3 | 4 | 5 | 6 | 7 |
|---|---|---|---|---|---|---|---|---|---|
| Fine Gael | John Mulholland | | 844 | | | | | | |
| Fianna Fáil | Martin Connolly* | | 671 | 671 | 705 | 721 | 734 | 766 | 802 |
| Fianna Fáil | Gerry Molloy* | | 532 | 533 | 585 | 609 | 656 | 709 | 757 |
| Fine Gael | Pat McNamara* | | 525 | 530 | 535 | 564 | 598 | 666 | 781 |
| Labour | Noreen Robin | | 221 | 222 | 225 | 234 | 250 | 297 | |
| Independent | Gary O Lochlainn | | 161 | 162 | 168 | 189 | 237 | | |
| Independent | Odran O'Leary | | 154 | 155 | 163 | 179 | | | |
| Independent | John Francis King* | | 115 | 115 | 119 | | | | |
| Fianna Fáil | Frances Quigley | | 113 | 113 | | | | | |
Electorate: 6,909 Valid: 3,336 (48.72%) Spoilt: 30 Quota: 835 Turnout: 3,366

=== West Ward ===
West Ward: 5 seats
| Party | Candidate | FPv% | Count | | | | | | | |
| Party | Candidate | FPv% | 1 | 2 | 3 | 4 | 5 | 6 | 7 | 8 |
|---|---|---|---|---|---|---|---|---|---|---|
| Workers' Party | Jimmy Brick | | 911 | | | | | | | |
| Fianna Fáil | Bobby Molloy TD | | 638 | 658 | 689 | 704 | 731 | 746 | 951 | |
| Fianna Fáil | Michéal Ó hUiginn* | | 596 | 604 | 629 | 640 | 667 | 698 | 832 | |
| Fine Gael | Angela Lynch-Lupton | | 533 | 538 | 540 | 600 | 628 | 650 | 681 | 705 |
| Labour | Sen. Michael D. Higgins* | | 531 | 559 | 563 | 574 | 614 | 783 | 835 | |
| Fianna Fáil | Mary Byrne* | | 417 | 426 | 435 | 446 | 476 | 488 | | |
| Fine Gael | J.J. McDonagh | | 390 | 391 | 409 | 496 | 532 | 571 | 607 | 630 |
| Labour | Joe Murray | | 255 | 273 | 277 | 284 | 317 | | | |
| Fine Gael | Martin O'Connell | | 223 | 227 | 228 | | | | | |
| Independent | Tom Browne* | | 213 | 226 | 232 | 244 | | | | |
| Independent | William Lambe | | 90 | 94 | | | | | | |
Electorate: 11,042 Valid: 4,797 (43.77%) Spoilt: 36 Quota: 800 Turnout: 4,833

== Local electoral areas ==
The borough of Galway was divided into the three local electoral areas (LEAs), defined by wards, townlands and district electoral divisions.

| LEA | Electoral divisions | Seats |
|---|---|---|
| No. 1 | The East Ward and the North Ward, and The townlands of:— Coolagh, Curragrean, Doughiska, in the district electoral division of Ballintemple; Ballindooly in the district electoral division of Carrowbrowne; and Ballybaan Beg, Ballybaan More, Ballybrit, Castlegar, Coolagh, Glenanail, Menlough, Merlinpark, Murroogh, Parkmore, Rahylin Glebe, Roscam in the district electoral division of Galway Rural. | 7 |
| No. 2 | The West Ward, and the townlands of:— Ballyburke, Ballymoneen East, Ballymoneen West, Ballynahown East, Barna, Cappagh, Cloonagower, Clybaun, Keeraun, Kimmeenmore, Lenabower, Mincloon, Shanballyduff, Shangort in the district electoral division of Barna; and Ballyagh, Barnacranny, Bushypark, Dangan Lower, Letteragh, Rahoon, in the district electoral division of Galway Rural. | 5 |
| No. 3 | The South Ward, and the townlands of:— Gortnalecka, Knocknacarragh, Pollnarooma West, Rusheen in the district electoral division of Barna. | 3 |
