= 1991 Galway Corporation election =

Part of the 1991 Irish local elections

- 27 June 1991

All 15 seats on Galway City Council
	First party	Second party	Third party
Party	Fianna Fáil	Progressive Democrats	Fine Gael
Seats won	4	4	4
Seat change	-2	+4	-1
	Fourth party	Fifth party	Sixth party
Party	Labour	Independent	Workers' Party
Seats won	2	1	0
Seat change	+1	0	-2
- Map showing the area of Galway City Council
Council control after election
TBD

An election to Galway City Council took place on 27 June 1991 as part of that year's Irish local elections. 15 councillors were elected from three local electoral areas (LEAs) for a five-year term of office on the electoral system of proportional representation by means of the single transferable vote (PR-STV). This term was extended twice, first to 1998, then to 1999.

== Results by party ==
Party	Seats	±	First Pref. votes	FPv%	±%
Fianna Fáil	4	-2	4,645	27.37	
Progressive Democrats	4	+4	3,746	22.07	
Fine Gael	4	-1	3,437	20.25	
Labour	2	+1	2,242	13.21	
Independent	1	0	2,121	12.50	
Workers' Party	0	-2	484	2.85	
Totals	15	0		100.00	—

== Results by local electoral area ==
=== Galway No.1 ===
Galway No.1 - 7 seats
Party	Candidate	FPv%	Count												
Party	Candidate	FPv%	1	2	3	4	5	6	7	8	9	10	11	12	13
Fianna Fáil	Michael Leahy*	10.9%	825	828	842	853	876	1,028							
Progressive Democrats	Declan McDonnell	10.4%	789	794	805	813	843	850	852	881	991				
Progressive Democrats	Bridie O'Flaherty*	9.2%	698	704	723	742	774	787	789	822	971				
Fine Gael	Fintan Coogan*	8.0%	604	611	622	633	699	732	735	795	843	858	865	896	1,005
Fine Gael	Pádraic McCormack TD*	7.3%	556	562	569	579	646	654	655	674	716	722	726	762	816
Fianna Fáil	Henry O'Connor	6.4%	485	489	502	507	528	598	621	646	659	664	666	936	1,008
Independent	Brendan Smith	5.7%	433	435	467	483	498	507	508	551	586	588	591	611	683
Progressive Democrats	Martin McHugh	5.5%	418	419	424	434	461	467	468	490					
Independent	Pat McNamara*	5.5%	413	424	436	446	456	476	480	513	527	531	533	551	
Fianna Fáil	Sean Nolan	5.1%	386	388	393	394	412	439	480	491	516	521	523		
Fianna Fáil	Sean Fox	4.9%	374	374	380	386	395								
Labour	Tom Costello	4.8%	360	362	385	513	542	561	562	683	713	720	724	752	827
Workers' Party	Liz Hackett*	4.5%	340	342	367	406	415	434	434						
Fine Gael	Mary Tierney	4.5%	340	341	348	360									
Labour	Ivan McPhillips	3.7%	279	282	292										
Republican Sinn Féin	Dave Joyce	2.9%	216	218											
Independent	Edward Manning	0.8%	58												
Electorate: 15,295 Valid: 7,574 (49.52%) Spoilt: 81 Quota: 947 Turnout: 7,655 (50.05%)

=== Galway No.2 ===
Galway No.2 - 3 seats
Party	Candidate	FPv%	Count								
Party	Candidate	FPv%	1	2	3	4	5	6	7	8	9
Progressive Democrats	Martin Connolly*	15.9%	543	552	562	575	591	693	1,004		
Fine Gael	John Mulholland*	15.5%	527	537	569	599	729	807	909		
Fianna Fáil	Tom Cox	13.4%	455	461	485	534	551	637	654	735	762
Fianna Fáil	Tony O'Connor	13.3%	452	455	475	548	571	592	643	714	739
Progressive Democrats	Tom Burke	11.5%	393	397	424	451	474	519			
Labour	John Cunningham	9.5%	324	400	426	432	446				
Fine Gael	Michael Walsh	6.1%	207	210	227	235					
Fianna Fáil	Carmel Garrett	5.8%	199	202	218						
Independent	Eileen Manning	5.3%	179	188							
Labour	Noreen Robinson	3.7%	126								
Electorate: 7,004 Valid: 3,405 (48.62%) Spoilt: 39 Quota: 852 Turnout: 3,444 (49.17%)

=== Galway No.3 ===
Galway No.3 - 5 seats
Party	Candidate	FPv%	Count											
Party	Candidate	FPv%	1	2	3	4	5	6	7	8	9	10	11	12
Labour	Michael D. Higgins TD*	15.7%	940	959	968	1,033								
Fianna Fáil	Michéal Ó hUiginn*	13.9%	832	837	868	879	880	961	989	1,026				
Fine Gael	Angela Lynch-Lupton*	10.1%	608	611	621	631	632	643	666	693	699	723	772	845
Fine Gael	Billy Lawless	9.9%	595	596	602	608	609	634	651	680	684	708	753	799
Independent	Paddy Lally*	9.2%	554	564	567	584	587	594	638	722	729	811	909	972
Progressive Democrats	Liam Madden	8.6%	513	514	518	519	520	541	568	584	586	615	657	906
Progressive Democrats	Donal Lyons	16.5%	392	393	397	398	399	406	467	480	481	505	528	
Fianna Fáil	John Byrne	5.4%	324	326	345	346	346	389	395	420	426	437		
Independent	Tom Browne	4.2%	252	259	260	269	272	276	283					
Independent	Aidan McCabe	3.9%	232	223	236	237	238	243						
Labour	Jim Mullarkey	3.6%	213	223	226	253	275	280	293	313	314			
Fianna Fáil	Jim Doolan	3.4%	202	202	217	220	220							
Workers' Party	Michael Donnelly	2.4%	144	156	157									
Fianna Fáil	Mary Lawless	1.9%	111	114										
Sinn Féin	Mike Egan	1.3%	80											
Electorate: 12,664 Valid: 5,992 (47.32%) Spoilt: 48 Quota: 999 Turnout: 6,040 (47.69%)
