= Stephen Lynch fitz Dominick Dubh =

Stephen Lynch (fl. 1504–1523) was the 23rd Mayor of Galway, serving from 1507 to 1510.

Lynch was a son of Dominick Dubh Lynch, Galway's second Mayor, and nephew of Peirce Lynch, the first Mayor.

It was his wife, Margaret Athy, who founded the Augustinian monastery of Forthill while he was on a trading voyage. He may have had a second wife, a daughter of Mayor John Bodkin. He had at least seven sons, one of whom, Nicholas, was mayor in 1554 and 1561.

Following the sudden death by drowning of Mayor Arthur Lynch, Stephen Lynch was elected to fill out his term. He remained Mayor until September 1510, one of the few early mayors to hold office over successive terms.

He continued the work of his father and mother, Anastacia Martin, by extending what would become known as Lynch's Aisle in St. Nicholas' Collegiate Church. The arms of both Lynch and his wife, along with that of his parents, adorn the upper portion of two windows in the aisle.

Civic offices
Preceded by Arthur Lynch	Mayor of Galway; November 1507 – September 1510	Succeeded by James Lynch fitz Stephen

Civic offices
Preceded by Edmond Deane	Mayor of Galway; 1504–1505	Succeeded by Walter Lynch fitz Thomas
Preceded by Arthur Lynch	Mayor of Galway; 1508–1509	Succeeded by Stephen Lynch fitz James
Preceded by Stephen Lynch fitz James	Mayor of Galway; 1517–1518	Succeeded by John Bodkin fitz Richard
Preceded by Martin Font	Mayor of Galway; 1522–1523	Succeeded by Stephen Lynch fitz James
