= Thomas Bodkin (mayor) =

Mayor of Galway

Thomas Bodkin, fl. 1506–1507, was the first member of the Bodkin family to be elected Mayor of Galway. The Bodkins were one of The Tribes of Galway, and a sept of the FitzGerald family. He would be succeeded in office by John Bodkin fitz Richard (1518–1519, died 1523), Richard Bodkin (1610–1611), and John Bodkin fitz Dominick (1639–1640).

== See also ==
- Matthias McDonnell Bodkin
- Thomas Bodkin
- Matthias Bodkin
- Tribes of Galway
- Galway

Civic offices
Preceded by Walter Lynch	Mayor of Galway; 1506–1507	Succeeded by Arthur Lynch
