= Robuck Lynch =

Robuck Lynch, sixth Mayor of Galway, 1490–91 and 1501–02.

Along with the first two mayors, (Peirce Lynch and Dominick Dubh Lynch, Robuck is believed to have been a son of John Lynch, who was father to Nicholas and John Lynch. This demonstrates the hold that the Lynch family held on the town's mayoralty from the very first years of its creation. He appeared in the will of Pierce Lynch in 1507 and appears to have been the same man elected mayor in 1501.

== See also ==
- Tribes of Galway
- Galway

Civic offices
Preceded by John Lynch	Mayor of Galway; 1490–1491	Succeeded by John Skerrett (Mayor)
Preceded by Geoffrey Lynch (Mayor)	Mayor of Galway; 1501–1502	Succeeded by Edmond Deane (Mayor)
