= Dominick Lynch =

Dominick Lynch may refer to:

- Dominick Lynch (mayor), mayor of Galway, fl.1580–1581
- Dominick Lynch (wine merchant) (1754 - 1824), Irish born American wine merchant
- Dominick Dubh Lynch (died 1508), second mayor of Galway
- Dominick Lynch fitz John, mayor of Galway from 1548 to 1549
