= Robuck =

Robuck is a given name. Notable people with the name include:

- Robuck French, 16th-century Irish politician
- Robuck Lynch, 15th-century Irish politician

== See also ==
- Roebuck (disambiguation)
