= Richard Blake (16th century) =

Richard Blake was Mayor of Galway from 1533 to 1534.

Blake resided at Kiltolla (modern-day Kiltullagh, Carnamore), approximately ten miles east of Galway town. His grandfather, John Blake fitz William, was elected for the term 1487–88, being the third mayor. He had disputes with the Burke family, as well as his own Blake relatives, concerning the ownership of lands at Kiltolla, having inherited from his great-grandfather, William Blake. The dispute was not settled till 1536, with the intervention of Lord Chancellor of Ireland, John Barnewall.

In 1558 Blake gave legal approval to gifts of his ancestors to St. Nicholas's church, Galway. He died in 1564, having had sons Geoffrey, John, Martin and Thomas. The second son, John Blake fitz Richard, was elected mayor in 1578.

Civic offices
Preceded by James Skerrett	Mayor of Galway; 1533–1534	Succeeded by Thomas Kirwan (Mayor)
