= Peter Greene (Irish politician) =

Irish politician (1895–1963)

Peter Greene ON

Mayor of Galway
- In office 1954–1960
- Preceded by: James Owens
- Succeeded by: Fintan Coogan

Personal details
- Born: October 1895 Spanish Arch, Galway
- Died: December 21, 1963 (aged 68)
- Party: Fianna Fáil
- Children: 3
- Occupation: Politician

Peter Greene (October 1895 – 21 December 1963) was Mayor of Galway from 1954 to 1960.

Greene was born at the family home at the Fishmarket Pub, Spanish Arch. His father was Coleman Greene of Carna and his mother was Julia McGrath from Newcastle. He was a member of the Old Irish Republican Army from 1917 to 1926, when he joined Fianna Fáil. The following year he married and subsequently fathered three children. He represented the East Ward on the Urban Council from 1934.

As Mayor, he opened the first Galway Oyster Festival in September 1954. He was also Mayor during the KLM Flight 607-E disaster in August 1958, of which there were no survivors. Only thirty-four bodies were recovered. In 1960 Queen Juliana of the Netherlands awarded Mayor Greene the Insignia of the Order of Orange-Nassau, in recognition of the efforts of the Mayor and people of Galway. It was formally presented to the Mayor by the Dutch Ambassador in the city's Great Southern Hotel.

Civic offices
Preceded by Joseph Owens	Mayor of Galway; 1954–1960	Succeeded by James Redington
