= Patrick O'Flaherty =

Patrick O'Flaherty may refer to:

- Patrick O'Flaherty (writer) (1939–2017), Newfoundland and Labrador writer, historian, and academic
- Patrick O'Flaherty (politician) (1928–1989), mayor of Galway, 1964–1965 and 1973–1975
