= Peter Stubbers =

Peter Stubbers, Mayor of Galway, fl. 1654.

Colonel Stubbers was the first non-Tribal Mayor of Galway. The old corporation was forcibly dissolved in October 1654 and Colonel Stubbers, as one of the leading Cromwellian officers of the town's occupiers, became Mayor. He also seized Mayor Lynch's splendid house, now the King's Head pub.

On 12 May, Galway surrendered to Sir Charles Coote, "and it was at that time considered so very strong, that the loss of it carried with it the fate of Ireland, and was the determination of the rebellion." Colonel Stubbers became Governor of the town. It was a usual practice of the governor and other Cromwellian officers throughout the county to take people out of their beds at night and sell them for slaves to the West Indies. It is estimated that Stubbers sold out of the county over 1,000 persons in conjunction with the fellow Cromwellian officers including his son-in-law Edmond Bray. Bray was married to Stubbers daughter Tryphena.

His neighbour to the rear Richard Gunning, thought to have executed King Charles I, but local historians believe the actual culprit to have been Stubbers himself. After The Restoration, Stubbers disappeared, though it is now known that he lived quietly on family estates in County Louth.

Civic offices
Preceded by Tomás Lynch	Mayor of Galway; October 1654 – September 1655	Succeeded by Humphrey Hurd
