= Claude Toft =

Mayor of Galway, Ireland

David Claude Toft (10 April 1922 – 3 December 1981) was the Mayor of Galway from July 1981 until his death.

Toft was born in Galway to Abby Toft of Dublin, and Florence (née Piper) Toft of Tramore, County Waterford, and had two siblings, Kenneth and Maureen. The family was in the amusement business. They set up arcades in Eyre Square during the Galway Races. The final two days takings of race week were always donated to charity.

A campaigner for Bobby Molloy since the 1960s brought him into the political arena, and he successfully contested the 1979 Galway Corporation elections. He was elected Mayor of Galway on 29 June 1981. Upon receiving the chain of office from Bridie O'Flaherty he joked "The only reason I'm taking on this job is to have the family name on the chain - isn't that perfectly understandable!"

Already ill on the night of his election, Toft nonetheless continued in his duties, his last official function being an especially strenuous journey to New York City for the Galwaymen's Association Centennial celebrations. He died on 3 December 1981, aged 59, from undisclosed causes, and was succeeded in office by Michael D. Higgins. He was buried in the New Cemetery, Bohermore, survived by his daughter Gillian and her family.

Civic offices
Preceded by Bridie O'Flaherty	Mayor of Galway; July – December 1981	Succeeded by Michael D. Higgins
