= Martin Connolly =

Martin Connolly may refer to:

- Martin Connolly (Irish politician) (1924–2006), mayor of Galway
- Martin Connolly (British politician) (1874–1945), member of parliament for Newcastle-upon-Tyne East
