= Richard Bodkin =

Richard Bodkin was the mayor of Galway from 1610 to 1611.

Bodkin was sworn into office on 29 September 1610. As Galway was granted a new charter on 18 December by James II, Bodkin appears to have been the first mayor to have a sword borne before him. The sword is the still property of the Galway Corporation. The title of bailiff, referring to the mayor's two deputies, was changed to sheriff, with the first two holders being Patrick Martyn and Christopher Bodkin.

== See also ==
- Tomás Bobhdacing
- Thomas Bodkin
- John Bodkin fitz Richard
- John Bodkin fitz Dominick
- John Bodkin
- Dominick Dáll Bodkin
- Tribes of Galway
- Galway

Civic offices
Preceded by Ullick Lynch	Mayor of Galway; 1610–1611	Succeeded by Sir Valentine Blake
