= Dominick Lynch fitz John =

Dominick Lynch fitz John, Mayor of Galway, September 1548–September 1549.

Lynch was the son of John Lynch fitz Andrew, and a grandson of Andrew, who had been Mayor for the term 1498–99.

A town statute passed during his term stated that any of the town's enemies seized by gentlemen of the town should be sent to the town to answer for their crimes. If found guilty, sentence was to be carried out by the Mayor and Bailiffs immediately.

Lynch married his kinswoman, Eleanor Lynch, by whom he had six known children: Thomas, John, Nicholas, Stephen, Geoffrey and Henry.

== See also ==
- Mayor of Galway
- The Tribes of Galway

Civic offices
Preceded by Thomas Kirwan (Mayor)	Mayor of Galway; 1548–1549	Succeeded by Thomas Óge Martyn
