= Stephen Arthur =

Stephen Arthur may refer to:

- Sir Stephen John Arthur, 6th Baronet (1953–2010), of the Arthur baronets
- Stephen Lynch fitz Arthur, Mayor of Galway 1546–1547
