= Patrick D. Ryan =

Irish mayor

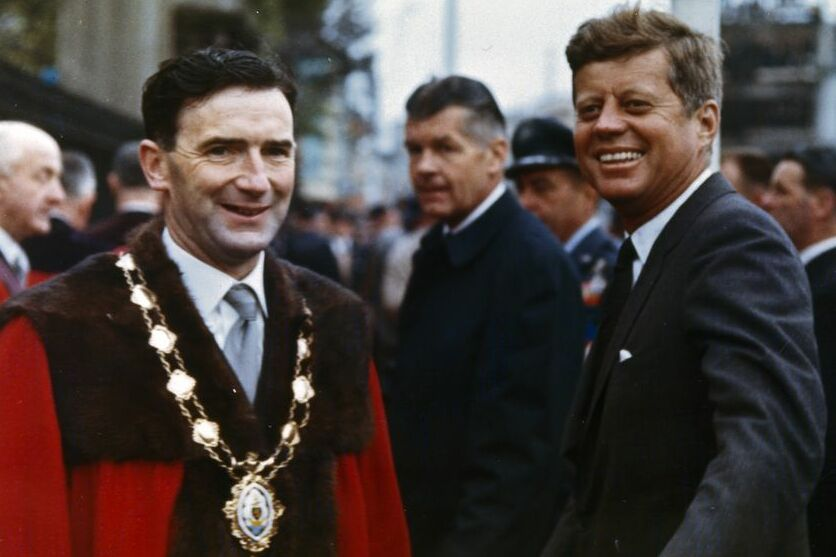
- Ryan in mayoral robes alongside President John F. Kennedy in June 1963

Mayor of Galway
- In office 1962–1963
- Preceded by: Fintan Coogan Snr
- Succeeded by: Martin Divilly

Personal details
- Born: 10 March 1920 Galway, Ireland
- Died: 13 April 2004 (aged 84) Galway, Ireland
- Party: Independent
- Spouse: Breda Fitzsimons (m. 1953)
- Children: 6

Patrick D. Ryan (10 March 1920 – 13 April 2004) was a local councillor with Galway City Council who served as Mayor of Galway from 1962 to 1963.

Born on Shop Street in Galway, he married in 1953 and, together with his wife Breda, opened the Ardilaun Hotel in the city in 1962.

Ryan served two terms as a councillor (alderman) with Galway City Council and was Mayor of Galway from 1962 to 1963. He oversaw the visit of President of the United States, John F. Kennedy on 29 June 1963 and conferred the Freedom of the City on Kennedy.

Ryan was also involved with the Galway Chamber of Commerce, Galway Oyster Festival and Galway Race Committee. He died in April 2004, at the age of 84.

Civic offices
Preceded by Fintan Coogan Snr	Mayor of Galway; 1962–1963	Succeeded by Martin Divilly
