= Richard Gare Lynch =

Richard Gare Lynch, Mayor of Galway, September 1529 - September 1530.

While leaving Galway on a voyage that became very profitable, Lynch fired a gun salute from his ship to a rock in Galway Bay, now thought to be Black Rock, Salthill. Because of the success of the voyage, the salute was repeated by his descendants over the next century.

== See also ==
- Mayor of Galway
- The Tribes of Galway

Civic offices
Preceded by John Lynch fitz Andrew	Mayor of Galway; 1529–1530	Succeeded by John Óge Kirwan
