= Stephen Lynch fitz Arthur =

Stephen Lynch fitz Arthur, Mayor of Galway 1546–47.

Lynch was the son of Arthur Lynch, Mayor in 1507. He enacted a statute the warden and vicars of the town should not set any lands or revenues of the collegiate church for over one year, apparently because longer tenures were being given to friends and relatives, which caused problems for the church. Three Lynch Mayors bearing the patroyomic fitz Stephen were elected mayor in 1552 and 1554 and 1603, but only the last, Marcus Lynch fitz Stephen, may have been his son.

== See also ==
- Mayor of Galway
- The Tribes of Galway

Civic offices
Preceded by Thomas Blake	Mayor of Galway; 1546–1547	Succeeded by Thomas Kirwan
