= Divilly =

Divilly is an Irish surname. Notable people with the surname include:

- John Divilly, Gaelic footballer
- Martin Divilly (died 1979), Mayor of Galway, Ireland
