= Andrew Lynch (mayor) =

Andrew Lynch (Mayor), 14th Mayor of Galway, died 25 March 1523.

Lynch was a member of The Tribes of Galway, and served the term 1498-1499. He is notable in that he attempted to connect the Corrib with Lough Atalia on the east of the town. The work was never completed and was afterwards referred to as 'Lynch's Folly.' He was the Mayor who oversaw the first recorded curfew in the town.

In the late 15th and early 16th centuries, Galway was engaged in a trade war with Limerick. Merchants from the latter city were licensed by letters patent from Edward IV to arrest any inhabitants of Galway found in Limerick and have their good impounded until an owed by Andrew Lynch fitz Stephen was paid. This was dated 1477 yet the dispute seems to have continued long after. Andrew is stated in a contemporary document to have died while under arrest in Dublin in March 1523.

He married Eleanor Martin and had two known children, John Lynch fitz Andrew and Arthur Lynch fitz Andrew. Both would serve as Mayors, for the terms 1528-1529 and 1539-1540 respectively.

Civic offices
Preceded by Dominick Dubh Lynch	Mayor of Galway; 1498–1499	Succeeded by James Lynch
