= Dominick Lynch (mayor) =

Irish mayor

Dominick Lynch (fl. 1580–1581) was mayor of Galway, Ireland.

Lynch was a member of one of The Tribes of Galway and his term occurred during the Mac an Iarla Wars (Mac an Iarla means the Earl's sons, i.e., Earl of Clanricarde and Earl of Thomond) which devastated much of County Galway from about 1570– about 1584. Two of them, a Burke and an O'Brien, were captured and brought to Galway to be hanged. Lynch secured a pardon for the prisoners, but was deliberately held up on the way from the Thosel to the gallows outside the town walls by order of Sheriff William Óge Martyn, who proceeded to hang them, though fully aware of Lynch's pardon.

Other events during his term of office including the construction of the west side of the Thosel and his foundation of one of the town's first schools, situated near the Spanish Arch. It was called Saint Nicholas's Lay School, also known as the Free School. It became the most important grammar school west of the Shannon over the next sixty years, with students studying the classics and Irish literature and culture. By 1608 some twelve hundred were attending the school, by which stage it had gained great statues all over Ireland. Among those who would attend the school were historians John Lynch, Dubhaltach Mac Fhirbhisigh and Ruaidhrí Ó Flaithbheartaigh. Other possible students include Patrick D'Arcy and Richard Martyn, as well as other notables of the town.

Lynch made a donation of money to the corporation, and gave it his own mansion to serve as the Town Hall.

Dominick Lynch had at least one son, Geoffrey Lynch, who represented the town in the bid for a Charter in 1610.

Civic offices
Preceded by Martin French	Mayor of Galway; 1580–1581	Succeeded by Peter Lynch
