= Thomas Tierney (mayor) =

Thomas Tierney (1916 – 22 February 1998) was a previous Mayor of Galway, Ireland.

== Biography ==
=== Early life ===
Tierney was born in Galway's Mainguard Street, the son of John Tierney of Hollymount, County Mayo, and Ellen Kinnevey of Roscahill, County Galway. 'Tommy' was one of 3 children, and he had one brother and one sister. The family ran a grocery, and after the early death of his father, the business was sold and Ellen re-joined her first profession, nursing.

=== Career ===
Tierney began working for CIÉ shortly after leaving school, and was to become a prominent member of the Irish Transport and General Workers' Union, holding the roles of branch secretary and vice-president. His work in trade unionism brought him into politics and in 1960 he was elected to Galway Corporation where he became Mayor as an independent labour candidate in 1967, the first of the kind in Galway. He made industrial unrest and unemployment his priority, and was proud of the fact that while he was Mayor, no industrial action was taken in the city. This was avoided because Tierney made himself constantly available for negotiations between management and unions.

He made history in 1968 when he became the first Mayor from Ireland to wear his robes of office in Stormont Castle while meeting the Prime Minister of Northern Ireland, Terence O'Neill. Among the items discussed were tourism, and the unsettling political situation. In March 1968 he was guest of honor of Mayor Richard J. Daley of Chicago during the Saint Patrick's Day parade. On this trip he addressed the United States House of Representatives, and in Boston visited American soldiers wounded in Vietnam.

Tierney spent nineteen years on the corporation, fifteen on the Harbour Board as Commissioner, and a number of other private and public associations. At the 1969 general election, he was the Labour Party candidate in Galway West, but he was not elected.

=== Personal life ===
He married Margaret (Peggy) Lydon in 1945, and had nine children. He is buried in New Cemetery, Bohermore.

Civic offices
Preceded by Brendan Holland	Mayor of Galway; 1967–1968	Succeeded by Bobby Molloy
