= Humphrey Hurd =

Humphrey Hurd, Mayor of Galway 1655-56.

A Lieutenant-Colonel in the Cromwellian army of occupation in Ireland, Hurd was the first of the Protestant Mayors elected following the removal of the old tribal corporation. He was said to have originally been a carpenter by trade, and is listed as owning property seized from the tribal families in the town in a survey of 1657.

Civic offices
Preceded by Peter Stubbers	Mayor of Galway; October 1655–September 1656	Succeeded by Paul Dodd
