= William Morris (Irish mayor) =

Irish mayor

William Morris was Mayor of Galway, 1527-28.

Morris was the first of two members of his family who would serve as Mayors of Galway. A law passed during his term outlawed the playing of games such as hurling and handball, with archery and football encouraged in its place. His descendants would include Baron Killanin, and the filmmaker John Ford.

== See also ==
- Tribes of Galway

Civic offices
| Preceded by Rychard Martin | Mayor of Galway; 1527–1528 | Succeeded by Richard Gare Lynch |
