= James Redington =

Irish politician (1872–1962)

James Francis ("Jimmy") Redington (4 October 1872 – 10 February 1962) was Mayor of Galway from 1960 to 1961, the sixth since Restoration of Office.

Redington was born on Prospect Hill, just outside the old medieval city, the youngest of six. With both of his parents dead by 1880, he lived with his grandparents at Knockdoe for a time. He was secretary of the Galway branch of the Gaelic League in 1896. Politically he followed Parnell and John Redmond. He was a founder member of the Connacht Tribune and a member of the Gaelic Athletic Association (GAA).

He married Mary Leonard in 1900 but she died in childbirth in 1901. In 1921, he married Winifred ("Winette") McNamara (1886-1973) and had children Bernadette (1926-2013) and Martin (1927-2001).

He joined local government upon Ireland's independence in 1922, being elected (with his brother, Martin) to the Galway Urban Council. In 1937 he became an independent member of the reinstituted Galway Corporation. He chose not to affiliate with any political party during his career.

At his election in 1960 he was the oldest recorded Mayor (aged 88) but despite this Redington kept up an active schedule. The highlight of his term was returning from New York in October 1960 with the Civic Sword and Mace of Galway. He was presented them by Mrs. Millicent Hearst, Sr., along with Irish Minister for External Affairs, Frank Aiken.

Civic offices
Preceded by Peter Greene	Mayor of Galway; 1960–1961	Succeeded by Fintan Coogan Snr
