= Shelia Jordan =

Irish politician

Mayor of Galway
- In office 1977–1978
- Preceded by: Gerard G. Colgan
- Succeeded by: John Francis King

Shelia Jordan was the Mayor of Galway from 1977–1978.

A native of Lower Salthill and later Raleigh Row, Jordan was the fourth of seven children to Patrick Walsh and Sabina Coyne. Patrick was a sergeant major with the Connaught Rangers and fought during the Gallipoli Campaign. Two of his brothers, Michael and Peter, were killed in action. Upon returning, Patrick Walsh became a tailor. In 1945 she married John Jordan from Galway's Abbey Lane. Their children were Mary, Gerard, Hilary and John.

She served as chairperson and secretary of the Woodquay and District Residents Association, and this was her route into city politics. She was the third elected candidate in the 1974 elections, and became Mayor in 1977.

During her Mayoralty she entertained the French, British and Russian ambassadors. A notable occurrence during her term was her attendance, with her husband John, to services held by the Church of Ireland on three occasions. The preacher on the last occasion memorably stated that "if one leaves the door open, you will never know just who might walk in."

Civic offices
Preceded by Gerard G. Colgan	Mayor of Galway; 1977–1978	Succeeded by John Francis King
