= Oliver Óge French =

Sir Oliver Óge French (died 1666) was an Irish merchant and mayor of Galway.

French was a member of the Tribes of Galway. During the 1640s he held a number of civic appointments in the town (burgess, councilor, sheriff). He was an agent for the Irish Confederation to the United Provinces in May 1648, making a speech to the states general in The Hague. His speech outlined the reasons for the war in Ireland, the justness of the Irish cause and their many disadvantages. That October, he petitioned Prince Charles (later Charles II) to intercede with James Butler, 1st Duke of Ormonde in an effort to retain his lands. Because of his loyalty, Charles recommended his case to Ormond.

While Mayor of Galway (1650–51), French was knighted by Ulick Burke, 1st Marquess of Clanricarde. The town was just recovering from an outbreak of the plague, and warfare was endemic in the county. He sought terms for the town's surrender from Henry Ireton. His property was seized after the surrender in 1652 and he was transplanted to Mayo.

French was married twice. His first wife's name appears to be unknown, but his second was Eveline Brown, whom he married after 1648. She was the widow of Robert French of Monivea.

Civic offices
Preceded by Thomas Lynch fitz Marcus	Mayor of Galway; September 1650–September 1651	Succeeded by Richard Kirwan fitz Thomas
