= Seán an tSalainn French =

Irish politician (1489–1546)

Mayor of Galway
- In office 1538–1539
- Preceded by: Martin Lynch
- Succeeded by: Arthur Lynch and Arthur French

Personal details
- Born: 1489
- Died: 1546 (aged 56–57)
- Occupation: Lawyer

Seán an tSalainn French (1489–1546) was Mayor of Galway from 1538 to 1539.

French was born in Galway, a member of one of The Tribes of Galway. Baptised John, he was known as Seán an tSalainn ('John of the Salt') because of the immense wealth he accrued as a merchant. He financed several additions to St. Nicholas' Collegiate Church, and had a chapel built on the south side of St. Francis Abbey. A large stone building, called John French's Chamber, was erected on arches, just outside the town walls, over the river Corrib.

Four of his sons later became Mayors - Dominick (1568–69); Peter (1576–77); Robuck French (1582–83); Marcus French (1604–1605).

Civic offices
Preceded by Martin Lynch	Mayor of Galway; 1538–1539	Succeeded by Arthur Lynch and Arthur French
