= John Blake fitz William =

John Blake fitz William, third Mayor of Galway, 1487–1488.

Blake was a descendant of Richard Caddell, alias Blake (fl. 1278–1315). The surname Blake was adopted in remark of Richard's dark complexion. His original surname, Caddell or Cadell, suggests Welsh ancestry.

A member of one of The Tribes of Galway, John Blake was the first of eighteen members of his family to serve as Mayor of Galway, the last been Edmond Blake. He was the eldest son of William Blake, a burgess of the town, and had at least two siblings, Andrew and Thomas.

Blake's tenure is notable for the agreement signed between him and the then Clanricarde, William Burke, which bound the latter to defend the rights of the church of St. Nicholas's, Galway. In return, Blake guaranteed that daily prayers would be said in the church for de Burgo, and that a canonry would be established for his son, Richard Burke.

Blake married a daughter of Clanricarde, Annabel Burke, and had issue Geoffrey, Walter, Andrew, and Peter. Geoffrey Blake became the ancestor of the Blakes of Kiltolla, Oranmore, while Walter became Bishop of Clonmacnoise.

Civic offices
Preceded by Dominick Dubh Lynch	Mayor of Galway; 1487–1488	Succeeded by Geoffrey Lynch
