= Henry Joyce =

Mayor of Galway
- In office 1542–1543
- Preceded by: Dominick Lynch
- Succeeded by: Jonathan Lynch

Henry Joyce, Mayor of Galway, 1542–1543.

Joyce was a member of one of The Tribes of Galway, and the only member of the Joyce family to become Mayor. Other members of the family included Archbishop William Joyce of Tuam (appointed 1486) and William Joyce, bailiff of Galway in 1507. William Henry notes that he was active as an arbitrator in several legal disputes in the town over the course of his life

== See also ==
- Tribes of Galway
- Galway
- Richard Joyce

Civic offices
Preceded by Dominick Lynch	Mayor of Galway; 1542–1543	Succeeded by Jonathan Lynch
