= Brendan Holland =

Irish mayor

Brendan Holland (1918 – 12 November 1989) was Mayor of Galway from 1965 to 1967.

Born in Birr, County Offaly, Holland's father, Patrick Joseph, was from Craughwell, County Galway. The family moved to Galway in 1932. He was first elected to the Corporation in 1960.

In his first term, he oversaw the opening of the Cathedral of Our Lady Assumed Into Heaven and Saint Nicholas, officially opened by Cardinal Cushing of New York. Mayor Holland's son, Richard, was the first child to be baptised in the Cathedral, the ceremony being carried out by Cushing. He bestowed the Freedom of Galway on Cushing and Cardinal Conway.

During his terms, the 50th anniversary of the 1916 Rising was commemorated, the English Rose III landed at Kilronan, and the railway station was renamed in honor of Éamonn Ceannt.

Civic offices
Preceded by Patrick O'Flaherty	Mayor of Galway; 1965–1967	Succeeded by Thomas Tierney
