= Pat McNamara (Irish politician) =

Mayor of Galway
- In office 1982–1983
- Preceded by: Michael D. Higgins
- Succeeded by: Michael Leahy

Personal details
- Born: 1938; Claddagh, Ireland
- Died: 19 October 2016 (aged 77–78)

Pat McNamara (1938 – 19 October 2016) was an Irish politician who served as the mayor of Galway from 1982 to 1983.

== Background ==
A native of the Claddagh, McNamara worked for Connacht Mineral Company and played with Galway Rovers and Galway Town.

McNamara was elected to Galway Corporation in 1973 and was to spend the next seventeen years in politics. Elected Mayor in 1982, he visited one of the town's twins, Lorient, and Boston and Derry. He conferred the Freedom of Galway upon Paulo Evaristo Arns, the Archbishop of São Paulo.

McNamara died on 19 October 2016.

== Sources ==
- Role of Honour: The Mayors of Galway City 1485-2001, William Henry, Galway 2001.

Civic offices
Preceded by Michael D. Higgins	Mayor of Galway; 1982–1983	Succeeded by Michael Leahy
