= Christopher Lynch (mayor) =

Christopher Lynch was Mayor of Galway, fl. 1601–1604.

A member of one of The Tribes of Galway, Lynch was elected mayor during the Nine Years' War (Ireland), which had devastated Ireland and left the town of Galway deeply impoverished and depopulated. The town itself had been besieged twice in the 1590s, and though not seized, had suffered the burning of the suburbs and the seizing of goods and livestock. In addition, the town was obliged to pay for the maintenance of the town garrison, amid controversy, since 1579. To this end he sent one of the merchants, Nicholas Darcy, to London to seek much-needed payment and cancellation of debts.

The most dramatic event of his term occurred on 4 October 1601 when Lynch took the sworn statements of Andrew Lynch fitz Henry, merchant, and Doctor Thomas Lynch fitz Nicholas. The two had just arrived from Spain, stating that a large fleet had sailed from Spain and had landed at Kinsale, County Cork. Their evidence suggested that the fleet's original destination was either Limerick or Galway, but had been forced to divert due to bad weather. The landing of six thousand men had taken place on 2 October; thus Lynch immediately sent a dispatch to Dublin to warn the authorities. This in turn led to Charles Blount, 8th Baron Mountjoy, marching to Kinsale with as many men as he could take, where he laid siege to the town. The result was the Siege of Kinsale, leading to the defeat of the Gaelic-Irish.

Christopher was the son of George Lynch, and served as mayor again from June to September 1603, following the death of Mayor James Riabhach Darcy (father of the Irish nationalist Patrick D'Arcy.

Civic offices
Preceded by Francis Martin	Mayor of Galway; 1601–1602	Succeeded by James Riabhach Darcy
