= Dominick Burke =

Irish politician

Dominick Burke or Bourke (died 8 December 1747) was an Irish politician from County Galway.

He represented the Galway Town in the Irish House of Commons from 1735 to his death. He was also Mayor of Galway in 1735 and 1737 and Recorder of the town from 1739 to 1747.

His sons included Dominick, who married Margaret, widow of Francis Annesley of Ballysax and daughter and heiress of Edward Eyre of Galway, but had no issue by her, and Bingham, a captain in the Army. His daughter Sarah married George Brabazon of New Park and was the mother of Sir Anthony Brabazon, 1st Baronet.
