= Andrew Morris (mayor) =

Andrew Morris, Mayor of Galway, September 1588 to September 1589.

Morris had served as a bailiff for Galway Corporation in 1565. His single term of office occurred during the Spanish Armada. Some two hundred Spanish sailors were imprisoned in the town by June 1589. In the same month arrived Sir William FitzWilliam. On his orders all were beheaded. Only two are said to have survived, been given shelter within the town. The Pope is later said to have sent forgiveness to the town for the deed.

Andrew Morris died in 1594. His descendants include Baron Killanin and John Ford.

Civic offices
Preceded by John Blake	Mayor of Galway; 1588–1589	Succeeded by Richard Browne
