= Rychard Martin =

Mayor of Galway (fl. 1519–1537)

Rychard Martin (fl. 1519–1537) was a Mayor of Galway.

== Biography ==
Martin was related to Wylliam Martin, under whom he served as bailiff for the term 1519–1520. He served the first of three terms as Mayor for 1526–27. In 1535 he was again Mayor, been re-elected the following years.

He gained note in local folklore for firing a cannon at the castle of Mutton Island at the conclusion of a long voyage, so overjoyed was he to see his home again. Subsequent generations of the Martyn family observed this custom.

== See also ==
- The Tribes of Galway

Civic offices
Preceded by Wylliam Martin	Mayor of Galway; 1526–1527	Succeeded by William Morris (mayor)
Preceded by Thomas Kirwan	Mayor of Galway; 1535–1536	Succeeded by self
Preceded by self	Mayor of Galway; 1536–1537	Succeeded by Martin Lynch fitz James
