= Mickey Smyth =

Michael Smyth (27 April 1921 – 7 May 1981) was an Irish trade unionist and Labour Party politician. He was Mayor of Galway from 1971 to 1972.

Smyth was one of six children born to Patrick Smyth and Barbara Crowley of Prospect Hill, Galway City. He was a shop steward in the Irish Transport and General Workers' Union, and in 1963 became a founder member of the city's first credit union, St. Columba's Credit Union Limited, Mervue. He was to continue working for the Credit Union for the rest of his life. He was a member, and later chairman, of the Trades Council, joined the Labour Party in the 1950s, later becoming a member of its constituency council.

Smyth was elected to Galway Corporation in the early 1960s and was elected Mayor on 5 July 1971. It was under his auspices that the first Mayoral Ball was held, at Seapoint, Salthill, on 29 February 1972. At his instigation, cross-border holidays were held for children from Derry, a city he visited while Mayor.

He did not seek re-election to the council in June 1974.

Civic offices
Preceded by Martin Divilly	Mayor of Galway; 1971–1972	Succeeded by Michéal Ó hUiginn
