= Gerard G. Colgan =

F. Gerard Colgan (1907–2004) was Mayor of Galway.

Colgan's father, Matthew Colgan, was a native of Cappagh, County Kildare, and a constable in the Royal Irish Constabulary who was stationed in Galway and for a time in Ballyvaughan, Co Clare. Matthew married Delia Donohoe, a native of Clooniff, County Galway. Francis Gerard was the eldest of four children, and raised at the family's thatched cottage in Barna, Co Galway, where his mother was a schoolteacher and his father was first stationed. However they were forced to move when their house was burned down during the Irish War of Independence. The family moved to the Cappagh Road, and some years later to Dublin, before returning to Galway again, where Colgan graduated from university as a civil engineer. He began his engineering career in London, before returning to Ireland.

In June 1970, Gerry Colgan was co-opted to Galway Corporation to fill the vacancy created by the appointment of Bobby Molloy (Fianna Fáil) as Minister for Local Government. He was elected as a councillor in his own right in 1974 and he was elected Mayor on 5 July 1976, his first function been to open the Congress of the Irish Trade Unions at Leisureland the following day. He was present in St. Louis in March 1977 for the twinning of the cities, the visit also used to promote business ties between St. Louis and Galway. One of his last acts as Mayor was to attend the opening of the Zapata Lexington semi-submersible oilrig, anchored south of the Porcupine Bank, one hundred and sixty miles west of Galway.

Gerry Colgan played a notable part in the development of trade and tourism in Galway and Salthill. He married Carmell Small of Bohermore (in England in September 1944) and had children: Brian, David, Vivienne, Roy and Denise. His wife and children were accomplished musicians, notably Vivienne.

Civic offices
Preceded by Mary Byrne	Mayor of Galway; 1976–1977	Succeeded by Shelia Jordan
