= Arthur French fitz Geoffrey =

Arthur French fitz Geoffrey, Mayor of Galway, 1539–40.

French replaced Arthur Lynch fitz Andrew who had died while in office. Unlike other mayoral replacements, French never served as Mayor in his own right. The bailiffs, Andrew Lynch fitz Stephen and James Oge Lynch, do not appear to have been replaced. Legislation enacted during his term made legal the provision that widows were entitled to a third of their husband's possessions at the time of his death.

== See also ==
- Mayor of Galway
- The Tribes of Galway

Civic offices
Preceded by Arthur Lynch fitz Andrew	Mayor of Galway; 1539–1540	Succeeded by Thomas Lynch
