= Martyn (surname) =

Family name

Martyn, variant of Martin, is a surname of Gaelic origin. In Scotland, Martyn is a sept of Clan Cameron in the West Highlands. In Ireland, it is one of the Tribes of Galway.

== Family history ==
The Martyn family were one of a group of fourteen families who became the premier merchant and political families in the town of Galway during the late medieval and early modern eras. They traded with Scotland, England, Wales, France, Spain, and Portugal. Many were dispossessed by the Irish Confederate Wars and the subsequent Cromwellian conquest. The family have cadet branches in the U.K., Canada, USA, France, Hungary, and several other countries.

There is a worldwide internet-based society for people with the family name Martin and Martyn.

== Notable Martyns of Galway ==
- Wylliam Martin (fl. 1519), Mayor of Galway, builder of the Spanish Arch
- Thomas Óge Martyn (fl. 1533–1577), builder of Galway's West Bridge
- William Óge Martyn (fl. 1566–1593), notorious Sheriff and Mayor of Galway
- Richard Óge Martyn (1602–1648), lawyer and Irish Confederate leader
- Francis Martin (1652–1714), theologian
- Richard Martin (1754–1834), member of Irish Volunteers, supporter of Catholic Emancipation, and founder of the Royal Society for the Prevention of Cruelty to Animals
- Peter Martyn (1772–1827), soldier
- Andrew H. Martyn (1784–1847), parish priest who died during the Great Famine
- Thomas B. Martin (1786–1847), Member of Parliament and landlord who died saving his tenants during the Great Famine
- Mary Letitia Martin (1815–1850), novelist
- Edward Martyn (1859–1923), arts patron and political activist; co-founded Abbey Theatre, Dublin
- Violet Florence Martin (1862–1915), novelist and short-story writer
- Ferenc Martyn (1899–1986), Hungarian artist and sculptor descended from the Martyns of Galway

== Martyns outside Ireland ==
The surname Martyn is common in the West of England, particularly in Devon and Cornwall, where the name spelling could be Martyn, Martin or Marten. In 1543 John Martyn, John Martyn and Joan Martyn are listed with reference to Davidstow (Dewstow) in the "Cornwall Subsidies in the reign of Henry Vlll". In the 1569 Muster Roll John Marten and William Marten are mentioned for Davidstow. In the Register for St Stephens by Launceston the baptisms are given for two sons of Richard Martin of Dewstowe – Nicholas Martin 24 May 1584 and John Marten 21 November 1586. Dated 27 July 1646 is a Davidstow Administration for John Marten the Elder, late of Davidstow and it is possible that this is the John baptised at St Stephens in 1586.

Notable people with the name include:

- Beverley Martyn (1947–2026), English folk singer, songwriter and guitarist
- Damien Martyn (born 1971), Australian cricketer
- David Forbes Martyn (1906–1970), Scottish-born Australian physicist
- Henry Martyn (1781–1812), Anglican priest and missionary in India and Persia
- John Martyn (disambiguation), several people
- Thomas Martyn (disambiguation), several people
- Bryan Martyn (1966-), American soldier, politician, missionary
- Herbert Henry Martyn (1842-1937), founder of H.H. Martyn & Co. of Cheltenham

== See also ==
- Martin (name)
- FitzMartin

== Sources ==
- O'Flaherty, Roderic (1846) [Written 1684]. Hardiman, James (ed.). A Chorographical Description of West Or H-Iar Connaught. For the Irish Archaeological Society.
- Hardiman, James (1820). The History of the Town and Country of the Town of Galway. W. Folds and Sons.
- O'Sullivan, Mary Donovan (1942). Old Galway. W. Heffer and Sons.
- Ó Cearbhaill, Diarmuid; et al., eds. (1984). Galway: Town and Gown 1484-1984. Gill and Macmillian. ISBN 9789914166361.
- Nex, Lionel (1987). The Baronial Martins. Orphington: The UK Family History Society of Martin.
- Moran, Gerard; et al., eds. (1996), Galway: History and Society, Geography Publications, ISBN 9780906602751
- Miles, Dillwyn (1997). The Lords of Cemais. Haverfordwest: Cemais Publications. ISBN 0-9531961-0-0.
- Martyn, Adrian (2001). The Tribes of Galway. OCLC 48208254.*Phillips, Peter (2003). Humanity Dick The Eccentric Member for Galway. Parapress. ISBN 9781898594765.
- Henry, William (2003). Role of Honour, The Mayors of Galway City 1485-2001. Galway City Council 2002. OCLC 51023721.
- Martyn, Adrian (2016). The Tribes of Galway, 1124-1642. Adrian Martyn. ISBN 9780995502505.
