= Tomás Lynch =

Thomas Lynch, son of Ambrose Lynch, was elected Mayor of Galway in August 1654, while the town was occupied by British forces in the aftermath of the Cromwellian conquest of Ireland. Following a request by the occupiers, the Lord Deputy issued orders to have the power of holding council removed from the Catholics of Galway. This was implemented in October 1654.

Lynch was therefore the last of The Tribes of Galway to serve as Mayor in succession to the first, Peirce Lynch, who served the term 1485-86. He was replaced by Colonel Peter Stubbers.

Lynch held property on Galway's High Street, now in part occupied by the King's Head public house. Colonel Stubbers seized this from Lynch for his own use.

Civic offices
Preceded by Martine Lynch	Mayor of Galway; September 1654–October 1654	Succeeded by Colonel Peter Stubbers
