= Adam Font =

Adam Font was the Mayor of Galway, 1524–25.

Font was town bailiff in 1509. It was during his term of office that peace terms in a trade war between Limerick and Galway were reached. He was the second of three members of the Font family to become mayor.

== See also ==
- Tribes of Galway

Civic offices
| Preceded by Stephen Lynch fitz James | Mayor of Galway; 1524–1525 | Succeeded by Wylliam Martin |
