= Arthur Lynch fitz Andrew =

Arthur Lynch fitz Andrew, Mayor of Galway, 1539–40.

Lynch was a son of Andrew Lynch whose failed attempt to connect the lower Corrib with Lough Atalia in 1498 was called Lynch's Folly. Arthur died in office, though the date is not precisely known. His brother, John Lynch fitz Andrew, served as Mayor for the term 1528–29.

== See also ==
- Tribes of Galway

Civic offices
Preceded by Seán an tSalainn French	Mayor of Galway; 1539–1540	Succeeded by Arthur French fitz Geoffrey
