= Andrew H. Martyn =

Rev Andrew Martyn (1785–1847) was an Irish Roman Catholic priest and activist. He was a staunch supporter of the Repeal Association.

== Biography ==
Andrew H. Martyn was born in Eyre Square in 1785, the son of Henry Martyn (formerly of Breaffy, Castlebar). He claimed descent from the Martyn family, one of the Tribes of Galway. He began studying at Maynooth College in October 1804, been ordained in Carlow College on 10 April 1809. He served as curate at Oughterard, County Galway, until 1826, when he became vicar of Carrowbrowne, residing at the priest's house on top of Brierhill. Among his first actions was the building of a new church and the regular recording of births, marriages and deaths, "commencing 6th March 1827 Andrew H. Martyn, PP and V."

Martyn was described as "a rabid supporter of Daniel O'Connell" and his repeal movement. In October 1838 he led the men of the parish to a monster meeting at Kiltulla racecourse, where they joined men from the adjoining parishes of Oranmore and Claregalway "in a concerted movement to get relief from the tithes." He led the early efforts against the effects of the Irish Famine but died of typhoid on 24 August 1847 (as had his kinsman, Thomas Barnwall Martin). He is buried in the family vault in Forthill cemetery, Galway.

== See also ==
- The Tribes of Galway

== Sources ==
- History of Castlegar Parish, Padraic Ó Laoi, 1996.
- The Tribes of Galway, Adrian James Martyn, 2001.
