= Geoffrey Lynch =

Fifteenth century Mayor of Galway

Geoffrey Lynch (Mayor), a.k.a. Geffere Lynch, fourth Mayor of Galway, fl. 1488–1489.

Lynch was a member of one of The Tribes of Galway, and during his term of office he oversaw the introduction of the Dominican Order into Galway from Athenry. They were given a site overlooking The Claddagh, on the west bank of the river Corrib.

Lynch is said to have been knighted. He was married to a daughter of Walter Font and had at least one child, Anastasia Lynch. He may be the Geffere Lynch who was elected mayor in 1500.

Civic offices
| Preceded by John Blake | Mayor of Galway; 1488–1489 | Succeeded by John Lynch |
| Preceded by James Lynch (fitz Martin) | Mayor of Galway; 1501–1502 | Succeeded by Edmond Deane |
