= William Óge Martyn =

Irish mayor

William Óge Martyn (fl. 1566–1592) was the 101st Mayor of Galway.

== Early life ==
Also known as William Óge Martyn fitz Thomas, he was a son of Thomas Óge Martyn and Evelina Lynch of Galway. Bailiff of Galway in 1566 to 1567, he was kidnapped by the Earl of Thomond in January 1570 but was free in time to participate at the battle of Shrule in April of the same year. He served as High Sheriff of County Galway and Jailer of Athlone Castle during the 1570s and 1580s.

== Gráinne O'Malley ==
Martyn attempted to capture or kill the pirate Gráinne O'Malley at her stronghold of Rockfleet Castle in 1579, but was repulsed.

== Execution of the earl's sons ==
In 1580 he personally hanged, among others, William Burke, third son of the Earl of Clanricarde, for rebellion at the gallows outside the walls of Galway, fully aware that the condemned men had been pardoned.

The Annals of Loch Ce state:

LC1581.16 The Earl of Clann-Rickard's son, i.e. William Burk, went to Gaillimh to make peace with the Foreigners, on the engagement and guarantees of the Mayor, and of the town besides; and there was within before him a perpetrator of injury and destruction upon the Clann-Rickard, i.e. William Og Martin, and two bands of soldiers along with him. And after the Earl's son went in, William Martin and the Saxons acted treacherously towards him; and they apprehended himself; and nine of his people were hanged, and he himself was put in prison, in despite of the mayor, and of the town. And not long after that the Earl's son, and Toirdhelbhach, the son of Donnchadh O'Briain, were hanged; and on Corpus Christi the Earl's son was hanged, and O'Briain's son was hanged on the morrow.

== Mayor of Galway ==
Martyn served as Mayor of Galway from September 1586 to September 1587. He participated in a notorious session in December 1586, as recorded in the Annals of the Four Masters:

A session was held at Galway in the month of December of this year, and many women and men were put to death at it; and Edmond Oge, the son of Edmond, son of Manus Mac Sheehy, and eight soldiers of the Geraldines along with him, were put to death, information having been given against them that they had been along with those Scots who were slain at Ardnarea.

== Later life ==
William Óge also served as an interlocutor between the O'Flaherty's of Connemara and the administration in Dublin Castle in 1585 and 1586, and again in 1589 and 1590, when they rose in rebellion. He enjoyed a good working relationship with Murrough na dTuadh Ó Flaithbheartaigh.

He was survived by his brother, Francis, sons John and Richard, and was the ancestor of Edward Martyn of Tullira Castle (1859–1923).

== See also ==
- The Tribes of Galway

== Notes ==
- Óge (Modern Irish Óg) is the Irish term for "the younger" or "junior"; Martyn was so-called to distinguish him from his grandfather, Wylliam Martin, (c. 1480–1547), a former Mayor of Galway.

== Footnotes ==
Civic offices
Preceded by James Lynch	Mayor of Galway; 1586–1587	Succeeded by John Blake
