= Mary Byrne (mayor) =

Mary Byrne (1917–2004) was the Mayor of Galway from 1975 to 1976 and again from 1984 to 1985.

One of two children of Michael Byrne of Newry, County Down, and Brigid Kelly of Garafine, Ballymacward, County Galway, she trained as a nurse in the city's old Central Hospital and later worked as a staff-nurse at Galway Regional Hospital. She eventually became a Sister and worked in the Casualty Department for twenty-two years. She was a member of the Western Health Board from 1970 to 1988 representing General Nurses. She served as Chairperson of the Galway Branch of the Irish Nurses Organisation as well as being a member of its National Executive for many years.

Politically active due to her father's influence, Byrne was an active member of Fianna Fáil from the 1940s, and successfully ran for election to Galway Corporation in 1967, serving eighteen years as a Councillor. She was the first woman ever to run for Fianna Fáil in the West Galway Constituency in a General Election when she was selected as the running mate for Johnny Geoghegan and Bobby Molloy in the 1969 General Election. She created history on 30 June 1975 when she became the first woman to be elected Mayor of the City of Galway. Her first term of office coincided with International Women's Year.

She was re-elected for the term 1984–1985, the Quincentennial year of the Mayoralty. In commemoration of this, Galway's Quincentennial Bridge, spanning the River Corrib from Terryland to Newcastle, was begun. The foundation stone was laid by the Tánaiste, Dick Spring, on 15 December 1984. The following May, Byrne laid the foundation stone of the new City Hall at College Road, which was in use by 1991. During a long career in public life she served on several Boards including Comhairle na n-Ospideal and the City of Galway VEC. She was Chairman of the Board of Galway Technical Institute up to the time of her death.

She died 16 January 2004.

Civic offices
Preceded by Fintan Coogan Snr	Mayor of Galway; 1975–1976	Succeeded by Gerard G. Colgan
Preceded by Michael Leahy	Mayor of Galway; 1984–1985	Succeeded by Bridie O'Flaherty
