= Martin Divilly =

Mayor of Galway

Martin Divilly (died August 1979) was Mayor of Galway from 1963 to 1964 and from 1970 to 1971.

Divilly used his terms of office to extend and expand Irish tourist links, particularly in the U.S., where he travelled extensively. He was made an honorary citizen of New Orleans and was officially received by Mayor of New York, Robert Wagner.

His first grandson, Jon Richards, now a DJ on Galway Bay FM, was baptised on the opening day of Galway's New Cathedral by Cardinal Cushing of Boston.

Divilly died in August 1979.

Civic offices
Preceded by Patrick D. Ryan	Mayor of Galway; 1963–1964	Succeeded by Patrick O'Flaherty
Preceded by Fintan Coogan Snr	Mayor of Galway; 1970–1971	Succeeded by Mickey Smyth
