= Martin Connolly (Irish politician) =

Martin Connolly (October 1924 – November 2006) was the Mayor of Galway from 1987–1988.

== Biography ==
Connolly was born in the old Claddagh to Thomas Connolly (born in Boston) and Mary McDonagh of Spanish Parade. He was a member of the Sea Scouts, a personal friend of actor Sean McClory, and served two years on the ship Irish Poplar as ship's carpenter. He married Una Keaveney of Glenamaddy with whom he had children Thomas, Padraic, Marty, Seán, Kieran, Rory, Maura. He became deeply involved in the revival of traditional sailing craft of the Claddagh, such as the Gleoiteog and Galway hooker. An outstanding achievement in this regard was his restoration of the Claddagh Lass, a gleoiteog that had spent nearly twenty years neglected and underwater. Connolly restored it in six months.

Connolly became involved in local politics in the early 1980s in the campaign against plans for a raw-sewage pump plant at The Swamp (now called South Park), beside the Claddagh. He was elected to the Corporation in 1985 and was responsible for footpaths, roads and seaside walks repaired. As Chairman of the Claddagh Residents Association, he and other members worked at laying pipes into Galway Bay to ease sewage problems. In July 1987 he became the first Claddagh native to be elected Mayor of Galway. On 21 December 1987 he officially opened Galway's Quincentennial Bridge. On a thirteen-day business-and-tourism trip to Seattle, he was awarded by the State of Washington the titles of Honorary Distinguished Citizen, Ambassador of Good Will, and Washington General. While in office he entertained eight foreign ambassadors. Among them was the British ambassador, who expressed a wish to sail in Mayor Connolly's Gleoiteog, though this proved impossible for security reasons.

Civic offices
Preceded by John Mulholland	Mayor of Galway; 1987–1988	Succeeded by Fintan Coogan Jnr
