= Patrick O'Flaherty (politician) =

Irish mayor

Patrick O'Flaherty (21 December 1928 – 11 March 1989) was Mayor of Galway from 1964 to 1965 and from 1973 to 1975.

O'Flaherty was from Upper Dominick Street and one of six children. He boarded at Blackrock College, Dublin as well as being locally educated, graduating from University College, Galway in 1950 with a B.A. He was capped for Connacht rugby and called for the Irish squad.

His father, Michael, had served as Mayor in 1950 and 1951. Following his death in 1959, O'Flaherty became a member of the Galway Corporation. He was married to Patricia O'Connor of Salthill House. Their children were Michael and Cathriona.

Civic offices
Preceded by Martin Divilly	Mayor of Galway; 1964–1965	Succeeded by Brendan Holland
Preceded by Michéal Ó hUiginn	Mayor of Galway; 1973–1974	Succeeded by Fintan Coogan Snr
