= John Lynch fitz Andrew =

John Lynch fitz Andrew, Mayor of Galway, September 1528-September 1529. Lynch was the son of Andrew Lynch (Mayor 1498–99) and Eleanor Martin. He had a brother, Arthur Lynch fitz Andrew, who served as Mayor from 1539 to 1540. During his term, laws were introduced which forbade a number of forms of gambling, such as dice, cards, aimed especially against apprentices and members of the Gaelic community. Those found guilty would pay twenty shillings.

Lynch married his kinswoman, Redish Lynch, by whom he had at least one son, Dominick Lynch fitz John, who served as Mayor 1548–49.

== See also ==
- Mayor of Galway
- The Tribes of Galway

Civic offices
Preceded by William Morris	Mayor of Galway; 1528–1529	Succeeded by Richard Gare Lynch
