= Martin Font =

Martin Font, 35th mayor of Galway, 1520–1522, was a member of one of the Tribes of Galway, and one of only three members of his family to serve as mayor. Font had been bailiff in 1498 and was one of the few mayors who served successive terms. Adam Font was elected mayor in 1524, as was Givane Font in 1569. The last known member of the family was Geoffrey Font (c. 1709 – 1814).

Civic offices
Preceded by Wylliam Martin	Mayor of Galway; 1520–1522	Succeeded by Stephen Lynch
