= John Bodkin fitz Richard =

Mayor of Galway in the 16th century

John Bodkin fitz Richard was Mayor of Galway, 1518-19.

Bodkin was one of the four sons of Richard Bodkin. His brothers were James, Henry, and Laurence. John was married to Janet Morris, daughter of John Morris, town provost in 1477. He had several children, including Christopher Bodkin, Archbishop of Tuam (died 1572).

Bodkin was the Mayor responsible for passing a notorious town statute that forbade the Gaelic-Irish from making a nuisance of themselves in the town: "Neither O nor Mac shall strut nor swagger through the streets of Galway."

Mayor John Bodkin fitz Richard died in 1523.

== See also ==
- Tribes of Galway
- Galway

Civic offices
Preceded by Stephen Lynch (Mayor)	Mayor of Galway; 1518–1519	Succeeded by Wylliam Martin
