= Bridie O'Flaherty =

Bridie O'Flaherty (27 October 1917 – 12 January 2006) was an Irish Fianna Fáil politician who left that party in 1986 to become a founder-member of the Progressive Democrats. She was the Mayor of Galway from 1980 to 1981 and again from 1985 to 1986.

O'Flaherty was one of five children born to Patrick Lawless and Delia Laffy of Bullaun, Loughrea. When her father died in 1924, Delia sold the land and moved to Loughrea. At age sixteen she moved to Galway, working at the Great Southern Hotel. She met and married Larry O'Flaherty of Ennis, and had issue John, Mary, Della, Angela, Betty, Joe, Terry (herself a future Mayor), Tony, Claire and Trudy.

She became a well-known businesswoman, opening a canteen on the city's Fairgreen for farmers and dealers. A shop in Mervue was later expanded into a successful mini-supermarket.

Approached by Bobby Molloy to run in the 1964 elections, she failed to secure a seat by thirteen votes, but succeeded in 1969, and became Mayor in 1980 and 1985. Her achievements as Mayor included signing the official charter twinning Galway and Seattle, been guest of honor at the Evacuation Day Saint Patrick's Day Parade in 1981 in South Boston and in 1986 in Memphis, Tennessee, and representing Galway during visits to L'Orient, Amsterdam, and Jerusalem.

O'Flaherty's daughter Terry was mayor of Galway from 2003 to 2004 and again beginning in 2012.

Civic offices
| Preceded by Michéal Ó hUiginn | Mayor of Galway; 1980–1981 | Succeeded by Claude Toft |
| Preceded by Mary Byrne | Mayor of Galway; 1985–1986 | Succeeded by John Mulholland |
