= Pádraic McCormack =

Irish former politician (born 1942)

Teachta Dála
- In office June 1989 – February 2011
- Constituency: Galway West

Senator
- In office 25 April 1987 – 15 June 1989
- Constituency: Agricultural Panel

Mayor of Galway
- In office 6 June 1992 – 7 June 1993
- Preceded by: Michael Leahy
- Succeeded by: Michéal Ó hUiginn

Personal details
- Born: 15 May 1942 (age 83) Longford, Ireland
- Party: Fine Gael
- Education: St Mel's College

Pádraic McCormack (born 15 May 1942) is an Irish former Fine Gael politician who served as Mayor of Galway from 1992 to 1993. He served as a Teachta Dála (TD) for the Galway West constituency from 1989 to 2011 and a Senator for the Agricultural Panel from 1987 to 1989.

McCormack is from Kenagh, County Longford, and was educated at St Mel's College, Longford. He was elected to Seanad Éireann in 1987 for the Agricultural Panel and is also a former member of Galway County Council. He was elected to the Dáil at the 1989 general election and was re-elected at each subsequent election until his retirement in 2011. Prior to entering politics, he worked as a livestock auctioneer. He was Mayor of Galway from 1992 to 1993. He was Fine Gael deputy spokesman on the environment and local government, with special responsibility for urban renewal and housing policy in the 29th Dáil.

In April 2006, he announced his intention not to seek re-election at the forthcoming general election. However, in December 2006, after the withdrawal of Brian Walsh, the candidate originally selected by Fine Gael to replace him, McCormack announced that he had reconsidered his decision and would after all stand in the general election. He did stand, and in May 2007, he was re-elected on the twelfth of 13 counts, taking the third of Galway West's five seats.

In December 2010, he failed to secure a place on the Fine Gael ticket in the Galway West constituency for the 2011 general election. He said afterwards that he was not considering being added to the ticket.

Civic offices
Preceded by Michael Leahy	Mayor of Galway; 1992–1993	Succeeded by Henry O'Connor
Party political offices
Preceded by Phil Hogan	Chair of the Fine Gael parliamentary party 2001–2002	Succeeded by Tom Hayes
Preceded by Tom Hayes	Chair of the Fine Gael parliamentary party 2010–2011	Succeeded by Charles Flanagan

Dáil	Election	Deputy (Party)	Deputy (Party)	Deputy (Party)	Deputy (Party)	Deputy (Party)
9th	1937	Gerald Bartley (FF)	Joseph Mongan (FG)	Seán Tubridy (FF)	3 seats 1937–1977	
10th	1938	Gerald Bartley (FF)	Joseph Mongan (FG)	Seán Tubridy (FF)	3 seats 1937–1977	
10th	1940 by-election	Gerald Bartley (FF)	Joseph Mongan (FG)	John J. Keane (FF)	3 seats 1937–1977	
11th	1943	Gerald Bartley (FF)	Joseph Mongan (FG)	Eamon Corbett (FF)	3 seats 1937–1977	
12th	1944	Gerald Bartley (FF)	Joseph Mongan (FG)	Michael Lydon (FF)	3 seats 1937–1977	
13th	1948	Gerald Bartley (FF)	Joseph Mongan (FG)	Michael Lydon (FF)	3 seats 1937–1977	
14th	1951	Gerald Bartley (FF)	John Mannion Snr (FG)	Peadar Duignan (FF)	3 seats 1937–1977	
15th	1954	Gerald Bartley (FF)	Fintan Coogan Snr (FG)	Johnny Geoghegan (FF)	3 seats 1937–1977	
16th	1957	Gerald Bartley (FF)	Fintan Coogan Snr (FG)	Johnny Geoghegan (FF)	3 seats 1937–1977	
17th	1961	Gerald Bartley (FF)	Fintan Coogan Snr (FG)	Johnny Geoghegan (FF)	3 seats 1937–1977	
18th	1965	Bobby Molloy (FF)	Fintan Coogan Snr (FG)	Johnny Geoghegan (FF)	3 seats 1937–1977	
19th	1969	Bobby Molloy (FF)	Fintan Coogan Snr (FG)	Johnny Geoghegan (FF)	3 seats 1937–1977	
20th	1973	Bobby Molloy (FF)	Fintan Coogan Snr (FG)	Johnny Geoghegan (FF)	3 seats 1937–1977	
20th	1975 by-election	Bobby Molloy (FF)	Fintan Coogan Snr (FG)	Máire Geoghegan-Quinn (FF)	3 seats 1937–1977	
21st	1977	Bobby Molloy (FF)	John Mannion Jnr (FG)	Máire Geoghegan-Quinn (FF)	Bill Loughnane (FF)	4 seats 1977–1981
22nd	1981	Bobby Molloy (FF)	John Donnellan (FG)	Máire Geoghegan-Quinn (FF)	Mark Killilea Jnr (FF)	Michael D. Higgins (Lab)
23rd	1982 (Feb)	Bobby Molloy (FF)	John Donnellan (FG)	Máire Geoghegan-Quinn (FF)	Frank Fahey (FF)	Michael D. Higgins (Lab)
24th	1982 (Nov)	Bobby Molloy (FF)	John Donnellan (FG)	Máire Geoghegan-Quinn (FF)	Frank Fahey (FF)	Fintan Coogan Jnr (FG)
25th	1987	Bobby Molloy (PDs)	John Donnellan (FG)	Máire Geoghegan-Quinn (FF)	Frank Fahey (FF)	Michael D. Higgins (Lab)
26th	1989	Bobby Molloy (PDs)	Pádraic McCormack (FG)	Máire Geoghegan-Quinn (FF)	Frank Fahey (FF)	Michael D. Higgins (Lab)
27th	1992	Bobby Molloy (PDs)	Pádraic McCormack (FG)	Máire Geoghegan-Quinn (FF)	Éamon Ó Cuív (FF)	Michael D. Higgins (Lab)
28th	1997	Bobby Molloy (PDs)	Pádraic McCormack (FG)	Frank Fahey (FF)	Éamon Ó Cuív (FF)	Michael D. Higgins (Lab)
29th	2002	Noel Grealish (PDs)	Pádraic McCormack (FG)	Frank Fahey (FF)	Éamon Ó Cuív (FF)	Michael D. Higgins (Lab)
30th	2007	Noel Grealish (PDs)	Pádraic McCormack (FG)	Frank Fahey (FF)	Éamon Ó Cuív (FF)	Michael D. Higgins (Lab)
31st	2011	Noel Grealish (Ind.)	Brian Walsh (FG)	Seán Kyne (FG)	Éamon Ó Cuív (FF)	Derek Nolan (Lab)
32nd	2016	Noel Grealish (Ind.)	Hildegarde Naughton (FG)	Seán Kyne (FG)	Éamon Ó Cuív (FF)	Catherine Connolly (Ind.)
33rd	2020	Noel Grealish (Ind.)	Hildegarde Naughton (FG)	Mairéad Farrell (SF)	Éamon Ó Cuív (FF)	Catherine Connolly (Ind.)
34th	2024	Noel Grealish (Ind.)	Hildegarde Naughton (FG)	Mairéad Farrell (SF)	John Connolly (FF)	Catherine Connolly (Ind.)
34th	2026 by-election	Noel Grealish (Ind.)	Hildegarde Naughton (FG)	Mairéad Farrell (SF)	John Connolly (FF)	
