= John Francis King =

Irish politician (1926–1998)

Mayor of Galway
- In office 1978–1979
- Preceded by: Shelia Jordan
- Succeeded by: Michéal Ó hUiginn

Personal details
- Born: 9 July 1926
- Died: 18 December 1998 (aged 72)
- Party: Independent
- Spouse: Teresa Murphy (m. 1954)
- Children: 6
- Occupation: Politician

John Francis King (9 July 1926 – 18 December 1998) was the Mayor of Galway from 1978 to 1979.

King was born in the family home on Forster Street, but was in fact descended from a very old and prominent Claddagh family, his grandfather been Padge King, King of the Claddagh. His parents were Paddy and Delia. Educated by the Patrician Brothers at the Old Monastery school, he began an apprenticeship with O'Gorman's Bookbinders in August 1941. On 12 January 1954 he married Teresa Murphy of Fairhill, the Claddagh, and had Della, Paddy, John, Bernadette, Martina and Tony. In 1986, John Francis King went on to open J.F.K. Bookbinders in Sandy Road Centre, Galway. Run by his daughter, Della, J.F.K. Bookbinders today remains open for business.

He was elected to the corporation as an independent in June 1974, and acted as deputy-Mayor that year. Elected Mayor in 1978, his first civic duty was attending the twinning ceremony of Galway with St. Louis at UCG on 4 July. Prior to the engagement, King had made some notes for his speech which he left in his pocket. When he began his speech, he found that one of the notes was black while the second contained the measurements for his new suit. He made a point ever afterwards never to have a pre-prepared speech. An innovation of his term was the innovation of each councillor standing as deputy-Mayor for one month.

Civic offices
Preceded by Shelia Jordan	Mayor of Galway; 1978–1979	Succeeded by Michéal Ó hUiginn
