= Thomas Óge Martyn =

Irish merchant and politician

Thomas Óge Martyn (fl. 1533 – c. 1577) was an Irish merchant and politician who served as Mayor of Galway.

== Early life ==
Martyn was a merchant in Galway and a member of the Martyn family, one of the Tribes of Galway. He was the son of Wylliam Martin, who also served as Mayor of Galway.

== West Bridge and mills ==
In 1558, Martyn obtained a grant from Queen Mary to build a mill on the west side of the River Corrib, on the condition that he construct a new stone bridge with gates and battlements.

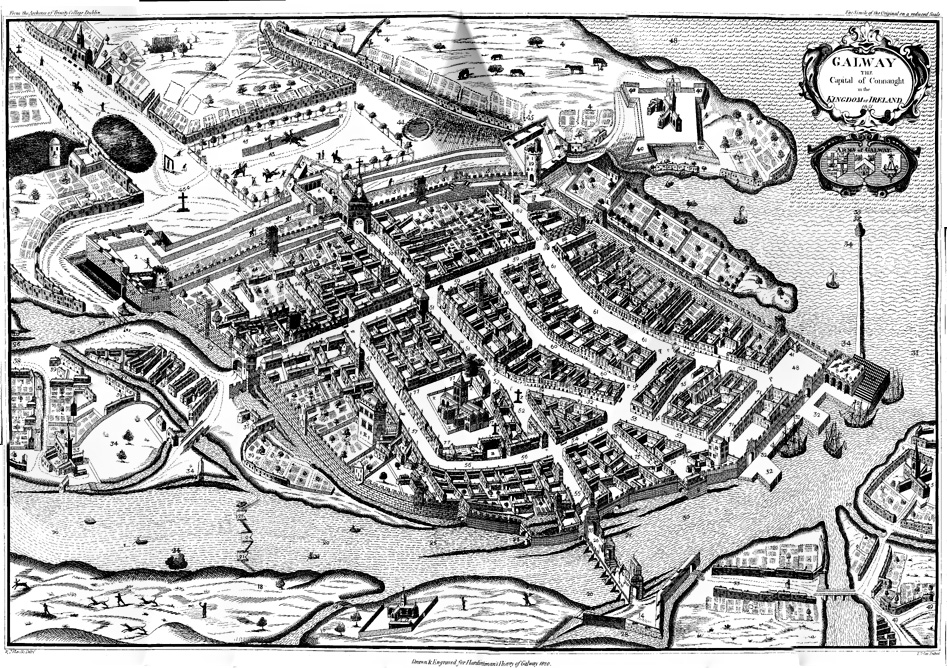
A 1651 map of Galway showing the walled city (north is to the left). The River Corrib is in the foreground, crossed by what is now O'Brien's Bridge.

The bridge and mill were completed in 1562 and bore a plaque stating that Thomas Óge and his wife Evelina Lynch "caused this bridge and mill to be made". The original structures were demolished around 1800 and later rebuilt as the Bridge Mills by the Murphy family. The rebuilt bridge is now known as O'Brien's Bridge.

== Later life and descendants ==
Martyn served as a bailiff of Galway from September 1533 to September 1534. He later served two terms as Mayor of Galway (1549–1550 and 1563–1564).

He also served as a master of Galway from 1550 until around 1577, after which he disappears from historical records.

He was the father of William Óge Martyn and Francis Martin, both of whom also served as mayors of Galway.

Through William Óge, Martyn is believed to be an ancestor of Richard "Humanity Dick" Martin (1754–1834), Harriet Letitia Martin (1801–1891), Mary Letitia Martin (1815–1850), and D'Arcy Argue Counsell Martin (1899–1992).

== Notes ==
- Óge is an Irish term meaning "the younger" or "junior". Martyn was so called to distinguish him from his grandfather, Thomas Martin, who was murdered before May 1520.

== See also ==
- Tribes of Galway

Civic offices
Preceded by Dominick Lynch	Mayor of Galway; 1549–1550	Succeeded by Richard Kirwan (Mayor)
Preceded by Thomas Blake	Mayor of Galway; 1563–1564	Succeeded by Nicholas Blake
