= Arthur Lynch (mayor) =

Arthur Lynch (Mayor), 22nd Mayor of Galway, died 20 November 1507.

Lynch was a member of one of The Tribes of Galway, and was notable as the first of the Mayors of the town to die in office.

He was elected in August 1507 and sworn in the following month.

The circumstances of his death were as follows: accompanied by his bailiffs, Anthony Lynch and William Joyce, he was making his way home from an inn in an intoxicated state when they fell off the town's Great West Bridge and drowned in the Corrib.

It is not known who replaced him as mayor, but Stephen Lynch was Mayor of the term 1508–1509.

Civic offices
Preceded by Thomas Bodkin	Mayor of Galway; September 1507 – 20 November 1507	Succeeded by Stephen Lynch (fitz Dominick)
