= Henry O'Connor =

Irish mayor

Henry O'Connor (born c. 1946) was the Mayor of Galway from 1993 to 1994.

Civic offices
Preceded by Pádraic McCormack	Mayor of Galway; 1993–1994	Succeeded by Fintan Coogan Jnr
