= Edmond Blake =

Irish mayor

Edmond Blake (1803–1895) was the last Mayor of the old Galway Corporation. Blake was a member of one of The Tribes of Galway, and the son of a previous Mayor, Colonel John Blake (1830–1836). He served from 1836 to 1840. In compensation for the loss of office, Blake received the Civic Sword and Mace in 1840.

He married Anne St. George of Tyrone House, Kilcolgan, and was survived by his daughter, Anne.

== Sources ==
- Henry, William (2002). Role of Honour: The Mayors of Galway City 1485-2001. Galway: Galway City Council. OCLC 51023721 ASIN B003NECRYW

Civic offices
| Preceded by John Blake | Mayor of Galway; 1836–1840 | Office abolished |
