= Thomas Kirwan (mayor) =

Former mayor of Galway

Thomas Kirwan was a former Mayor of Galway from 1534–35 and 1547–48.

Kirwan was the second member of his family to serve as Mayor; a further nine would hold the office. He was a descendant of William Ó Ciardhubháin, who had settled in the town of Galway in the 1480s.

During his second term, Kirwan responded to a threat of attack by Scots gallowglass and Gaelic forces by raising eight hundred men to defend the town within twenty-one days. While confidant of holding out on land, Kirwan expressed to the Lord Deputy in Dublin that Galway was in need of reinforcement from the sea. He pointed out in a second letter that, unlike other towns, Galway had always provided for its own defences.

One son, Thomas Óge, who died in 1542 while an alderman. His second son, Stephen, was ancestor to the Kirwans of Castlehackett House, Tuam.

Civic offices
Preceded by Richard Blake	Mayor of Galway; 1534–1535	Succeeded by Rychard Martin
Preceded by Stephen Lynch fitz Arthur	Mayor of Galway; 1547–1548	Succeeded by Dominick Lynch fitz John
