= John Bodkin fitz Dominick =

John Bodkin fitz Dominick was the mayor of Galway from 1638 to 1640.

A son of Dominick Bodkin, he was elected in August 1638. During his term, the town corporation provided finance for the construction of a new market house. He was the last of the Bodkin mayors of Galway, though a descendant of the Bodkin family, Martin Quinn, was mayor from 2000 to 2001.

== See also ==
- Tribes of Galway
- Galway

Civic offices
Preceded by Sir Roebuck Lynch	Mayor of Galway; 1639–1640	Succeeded by Francis Blake
