= Galway International Oyster Festival =

Annual seafood festival in Galway, Ireland

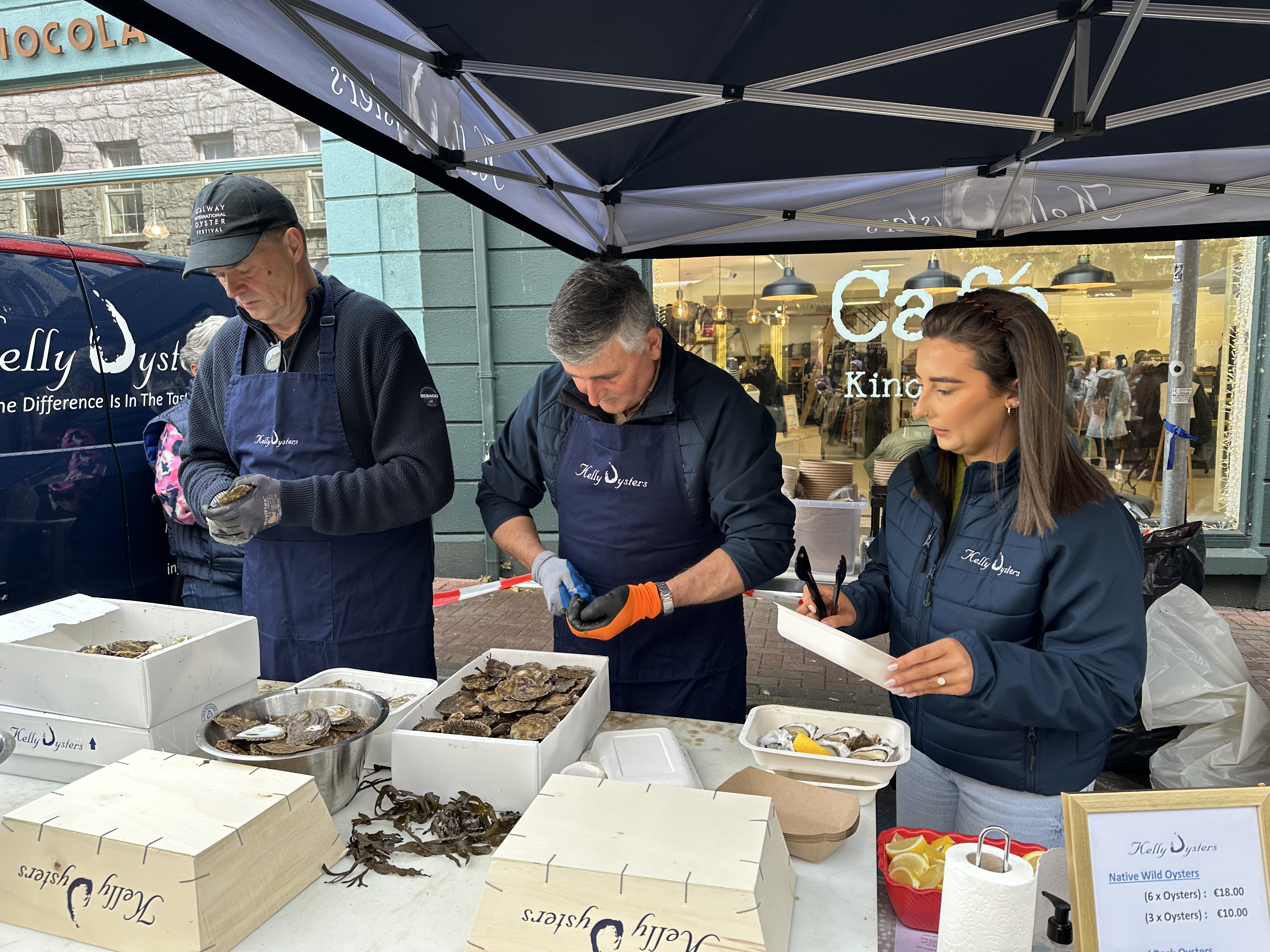
A stall selling Galway native flat oysters in Galway International Oyster and Seafood Festival 2025

The Galway International Oyster Festival is a food festival held annually in Galway on the west coast of Ireland on the last weekend of September, the first month of the oyster season. Inaugurated in 1954, it was the brainchild of the Great Southern Hotel (now Hotel Meyrick) manager, Brian Collins. In 2000 was described by the Sunday Times as "one of the 12 greatest shows on earth" and was listed in the 1987 AA Travel Guide as one of Europe's Seven Best Festivals.

The Galway International Oyster Festival was created to celebrate the Galway Native Oyster as a "unique feature" of Galway city and county. Hotel manager Brian Collins had been searching for something to attract more visitors to Galway, in what was then a quieter month of the year. Collins discussed the idea with representatives of Guinness and of Patrick M. Burke's Bar in Clarenbridge and the first Galway Oyster Festival was created in 1954. It had 34 attendees.

The festival was originally held in Clarenbridge village during the day and the Great Southern Hotel in Galway City at night until the mid-1980s, when all of the activities were held in the city centre of Galway. There was a red and white striped marquee at Spanish Arch and then at Nimmo's Pier by the Claddagh. In order to reduce ticket prices, the festival changed location to The Radisson Hotel Galway in 2009 but due to demand, the marquee was brought back in 2011, located in the Docks and the festival was renamed as the Galway International Oyster & Seafood Festival. In 2014, the 60th anniversary of the event, it returned to its original Galway City Fishmarket at the Spanish Arch.

The festival's events include two Oyster Opening Championships, the Irish Oyster Opening Championship and the World Oyster Opening Championship.

Clarinbridge, the original location of the Galway Oyster Festival, is running a separate Clarenbridge Oyster Festival as of 2019. The organisers state it was also incepted in 1954.
