= Michael Leahy (politician) =

Former Mayor of Galway

- Born: 1932; Ballylanders, County Limerick
- Died: 2006 (aged 73–74)
- Occupations: Fianna Fáil politician, Mayor of Galway

Michael Leahy (1932–2007) was an Irish Fianna Fáil politician. He was the Mayor of Galway from 1983–1984, 1991–1992, and 1997–1998.

Born in Ballylanders, County Limerick, Leahy began working for CIÉ in 1952, been transferred to Galway two years later. He contested in the election of 1974 but only became a councillor in 1979, representing the North and East Ward. He first became Mayor in 1983, and so oversaw the Quincentennial celebrations of the city's Mayoral status. With President of Ireland, Patrick Hillery, he formally opened the celebrations with the raising of the coats of arms of The Tribes of Galway at Eyre Square. Eighteen Mayors from Ireland and abroad arrived in February, he conferred the Freedom of Galway twice, and welcome President Ronald Reagan to the city on 2 June 1984.

One of his first acts for his second term was to welcome Councillor Tony O'Donohue, who had served for twenty years on the City Council of Toronto; both men had shared accommodation in Galway in the 1950s, after which O'Donohue emigrated following his graduation from University College Galway. Another was a visit to Voronezh, Russia, in June 1992 at the request of Galway University.

During his third term, on 5 May 1998, Leahy signed a six million contract for the construction of a causeway to Mutton Island, signally the start of the long-overdue construction of the sewage treatment plant. He also hosted receptions for the Druid Theatre Company, Rita Ryan Gilligan, MBE and formally opened the pedestrianised streets of Galway on 3 March 1998.

Civic offices
Preceded by Pat McNamara	Mayor of Galway; 1983–1984	Succeeded by Mary Byrne
Preceded by Michael D. Higgins	Mayor of Galway; 1991–1992	Succeeded by Pádraic McCormack
Preceded by John Mulholland	Mayor of Galway; 1997–1998	Succeeded by Angela Lynch-Lupton
