= Mayor of Galway =

Honorific title of the chairperson of Galway City Council

- Méara Chathair na Gaillimhe
- Incumbent; Helen Ogbu (Lab) since 19 June 2026
- Appointer: Galway City Council
- Term length: 1 year
- Inaugural holder: Peirce Lynch
- Formation: 1485
- Salary: €20,000
- Website: galwaycity.ie

The office of Mayor of Galway is an honorific title used by the Cathaoirleach of Galway City Council. The council has jurisdiction throughout its administrative area of the city of Galway which is the largest city in the province of Connacht, in Ireland. The incumbent, since June 2026, is Labour councillor, Helen Ogbu.

== Election to the office ==
The Mayor is elected to office annually by Councillors of Galway City Council from amongst its members. There is no popular vote. Up to 1841, Mayors were elected in August and took office in September. There was a strong tradition of festivities to mark this start of a new municipal year. Current practice is for the term of office to begin in June with the former Mayor presenting the Chain of Office to the incoming Mayor, thus formally inaugurating a new term. The process is repeated the following June, unless the same person is given a second consecutive term.

== History of the office ==
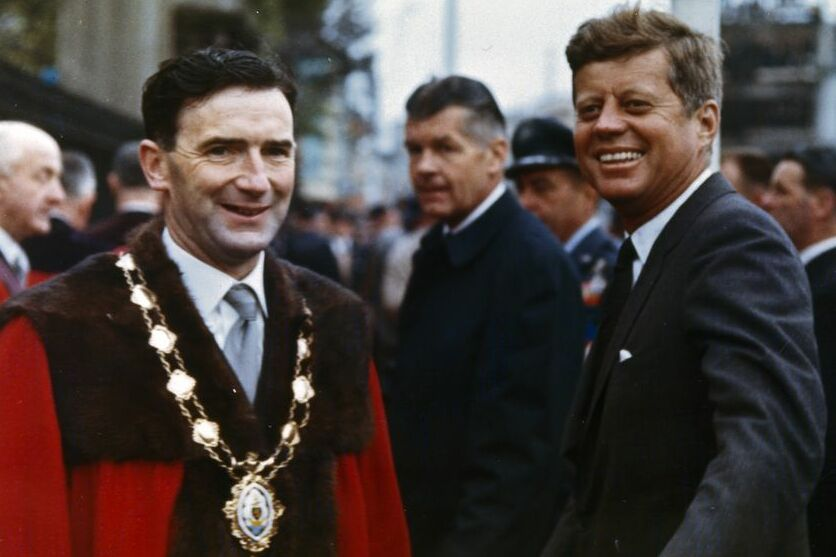
Patrick D. Ryan in mayoral robes alongside President Kennedy in June 1963

Prior to the creation of the mayoralty, the town of Galway was ruled by a Provost or Sovereign who was appointed by the Earl of Ulster. After the murder of the 3rd Earl in June 1333, the town was under the control of successive members of the Clanricarde line of the House of Burke. This situation lasted until well into the 15th century. However, charters from Richard II (in 1396) and Edward IV (in 1464) gave the citizens of the town semi-independence from the Clanricardes.

The office of mayor established by a royal charter issued by Richard III in December 1484 at the solicitation of merchants from the city's leading families, known as the Tribes of Galway. Although it survived the turbulent 17th century, the corruption of the office led to its disestablishment in 1841. Galway became an urban district in 1899. In 1937 the city regained its corporation status and the office of Mayor was re-installed.

Under section 11 of the Local Government Act 2001, the role is symbolic: "Subject to this Act, royal charters and letters patent relating to local authorities shall continue to apply for ceremonial and related purposes in accordance with local civic tradition but shall otherwise cease to have effect". The Act states the chairman of the Council must be styled the Cathaoirleach and that "Any reference in any other enactment to the lord mayor, mayor, chairman, deputy lord mayor, deputy mayor or vice-chairman or cognate words shall, where the context so requires, be read as a reference to the Cathaoirleach or Leas-Chathaoirleach or other title standing for the time being." (section 31 (3)).

== Officeholders ==
=== Early leaders (pre-1485) ===
Year	Name	Office
1270	Thomas de Lynch	Provost
1272–1275	Stephen Annery	Collector of the Murage
1272–1275	Adam Albus	Collector of the Murage
1278–1280	Robert Bayon	Collector of the Murage
1280	William O'Ciorovane	Sovereign
1306	Cruchus Delaps	Farmer of the New Customs
1306	Simon Long	Collector of the Customs
1306	Thomas Sage	Collector of the Customs
1306–1307	Thomas Dolfyn	Collector of the Customs
1310	Andrew Gerard of Florence	Keeper of the Customs
1312	Nicholas Mor Lynch, the Black Marshall	Marshal
1353	Stepehn Penrise	Provost
1353+	Stepehn Penrise	Bailiff & Collector of the New Customs
1375	Bishop Stephen de Valle	Collector of the Customs of the Port
1376–1377	Nicholas Calf	Deputy Collector of the Customs of the Port
1378	Richard Scared	Provost
?–1385	Thomas Alwyne	Seneschal and Receiver
1434	Edmund Lynch	Sovereign
1443	Edmund Lynch	Sovereign
1443	Robert Lynch	Provost
1443–1444	Henry Lynch, ditto. Robert Lynch, ditto. Thomas O'Tyernay	Bailiff
1445	Thomas O'Tyernay	Bailiff
1448	William Allen, alias Den	Provost
1460	William Dubh Lynch fitz James	
1461	William Develin	Sovereign
1462	William Oge Allen, alias Den	Sovereign
1476	Thomas Lynch	
1483–1484	William Lynch	Sovereign
1484–1485	William Lynch	Sovereign
1484–1485	John Lynch fitz Edmond	Provost

=== "Tribes" period (1485–1654) ===
From 1485, the title of Mayor of Galway was used.

==== 15th century ====
Year	Name
1485–1486	Peirce Lynch fitz John
1486–1487	Dominick Dubh Lynch fitz John
1487–1488	John Blake fitz William
1488–1489	Geoffrey Lynch
1489–1490	John Lynch fitz John
1490–1491	Robuck Lynch
1491–1492	John Skerrett
1492–1493	Thomas Lynch fitz Edmond
1493–1494	James Lynch fitz Stephen
1494–1495	John Lynch fitz Edmond
1495–1496	Thomas Blake
1496–1497	Walter Lynch fitz Robert
1497–1498	Dominick Dubh Lynch fitz John
1498–1499	Andrew Lynch
1499–1500	James Lynch fitz Martin

==== 16th century ====
Year	Name
1500–1501	Geoffrey Lynch
1501–1502	Robuck Lynch
1502–1504	Edmond Deane
1504–1505	Stephen Lynch fitz Dominick Dubh
1505–1506	Walter Lynch fitz Thomas
1506–1507	Thomas Bodkin
1507–1508	Arthur Lynch
1508–1509	Stephen Lynch fitz Dominick Dubh
1509–1510	Stephen Lynch fitz James
1510–1511	James Lynch fitz Stephen
1511–1512	James Lynch fitz Geoffrey
1512–1513	James Lynch fitz Martin
1513–1514	Walter Lynch fitz Thomas
1514–1515	Stephen Lynch fitz Walter
1515–1516	James Lynch fitz Stephen
1516–1517	Stephen Lynch fitz James
1517–1518	Stephen Lynch fitz Dominick Dubh
1518–1519	John Bodkin fitz Richard
1519–1520	Wylliam Martin
1520–1522	Martin Font
1522–1523	Stephen Lynch fitz Dominick Dubh
1523–1524	Stephen Lynch fitz James
1524–1525	Adam Font
1525–1526	Wylliam Martin
1526–1527	Rychard Martin
1527–1528	William Morris
1528–1529	John Lynch fitz Andrew
1529–1530	Richard Gare Lynch
1530–1531	John Óge Kirwan
1531–1533	James Skerrett
1533–1534	Richard Blake
1534–1535	Thomas Kirwan
1535–1537	Rychard Martin
1537–1538	Martin Lynch fitz James
1538–1539	Seán an tSalainn French
1539–1540	Arthur Lynch fitz Andrew and Arthur French fitz Geoffrey
1540–1541	Thomas Lynch
1541–1542	Dominick Lynch
1542–1543	Henry Joyce
1543–1544	Jonathan Lynch
1544–1545	Edmund Lynch
1545–1546	Thomas Blake
1546–1547	Stephen Lynch fitz Arthur
1547–1548	Thomas Kirwan
1548–1549	Dominick Lynch fitz John
1549–1550	Thomas Óge Martyn
1550–1551	Richard Kirwan
1551–1552	John Óge Lynch
1552–1553	John Óge Lynch fitz Stephen
1553–1554	Patrick Lynch
1554–1555	Nicholas Lynch fitz Stephen
1555–1556	Nicholas Blake
1556–1557	William Skerrett
1557–1558	James Óge Lynch
1558–1559	Ambrose Lynch fitz Martin
1559–1560	Thomas Blake
1560–1561	Stephen Lynch fitz Arthur
1561–1562	Nicholas Lynch fitz Stephen
1562–1563	Thomas Blake
1563–1564	Thomas Óge Martyn
1564–1565	Nicholas Blake
1565–1566	Peter French fitz Valentine
1566–1567	James Kirwan
1567–1568	Edmond Kirwan
1568–1569	Dominick French
1569–1570	Givane Font
1570–1571	Denis Kirwan
1571–1572	Robuck Lynch
1572–1573	John Lynch
1573–1574	Pierce Lynch fitz Oliver
1574–1575	Andrew Browne and James Kirwan
1575–1576	Dominick Browne
1576–1577	Peter French fitz John
1577–1578	Pierce Lynch
1578–1579	John Blake fitz Richard
1579–1580	Martin French
1580–1581	Dominick Lynch
1581–1582	Peter Lynch fitz Marcus
1582–1583	Robuck French fitz John
1583–1584	Nicholas French
1584–1585	Nicholas Lynch
1585–1586	James Lynch fitz Arthur
1586–1587	William Óge Martyn
1587–1588	John Blake
1588–1589	Andrew Morris
1589–1590	Richard Browne
1590–1591	James Lynch (fitz Ambrose)
1591–1592	Ulick Lynch fitz Edmond
1592–1593	Valentine French
1593–1594	John Martin
1594–1595	Rolande Skerrett
1595–1596	Marcus Lynch fitz Nicholas
1596–1597	Oliver Óge French
1597–1598	Anthony Lynch fitz Marcus
1598–1599	Nicholas Kirwan fitz Denis
1599–1600	Michael Lynch

==== 17th century ====
Year	Name
1600–1601	Francis Martin fitz Thomas
1601–1602	Christopher Lynch fitz George
1602–1603	James Riabhach Darcy and Christopher Lynch fitz George
1603–1604	Marcus Lynch fitz Stephen
1604–1605	Marcus French fitz John
1605–1606	John Skerrett fitz William
1606–1607	Edmond French fitz Robuck
1607–1608	Richard Martin fitz William
1608–1609	Stephen Kirwan
1609–1610	Oliver Browne and Ullick Lynch
1610–1611	Richard Bodkin
1611–1612	Sir Valentine Blake and Richard Martin fitz William
1612–1613	Sir Thomas Rotheram
1613–1614	Walter Martyn
1614–1615	Nicholas Darcy
1615–1617	Pierce Lynch fitz John Óge
1617–1618	Francis French fitz Peter
1618–1619	Nicholas Lynch fitz George
1619–1620	James Darcy fitz James
1620–1621	Andrew Lynch fitz John
1621–1622	Robert Martin and Richard Martin fitz William
1622–1623	Patrick Martin fitz Walter
1623–1624	Marcus Óge French fitz Marcus
1624–1625	Robert Blake fitz Walter
1625–1626	Thomas Lynch fitz Nicholas
1626–1627	James Lynch fitz Martin
1627–1628	Sir Richard Blake fitz Richard
1628–1629	John Lynch fitz Richard
1629–1630	Nicholas Lynch fitz Jonathan
1630–1631	Sir Valentine Blake
1631–1632	George Martin fitz Walter
1632–1633	Geoffrey Martin
1633–1634	Patrick French
1634–1635	Sir Dominick Browne
1635–1636	Nicholas Mór Lynch fitz Marcus
1636–1637	Anthony Lynch fitz James
1637–1638	Sir Thomas Blake
1638–1639	Sir Robuck Lynch
1639–1640	John Bodkin fitz Dominick
1640–1641	Francis Blake
1641–1642	Walter Lynch fitz James
1642–1643	Richard Óge Martyn
1643–1644	Sir Valentine Blake
1644–1645	James Darcy fitz Nicholas
1645–1646	Edmond Kirwan fitz Patrick
1646–1647	John Blake fitz Nicholas
1647–1648	Walter Browne
1648–1649	Sir Walter Blake
1649–1650	Thomas Lynch fitz Marcus
1650–1651	Oliver Óge French
1651–1652	Richard Kirwan fitz Thomas
1652–1653	Michael Lynch fitz Stephen
1653–1654	Martine Lynch fitz Anthony
1654	Tomás Lynch fitz Ambrose

=== Commonwealth and Restoration (1654–1691) ===
Year	Name
1654	Peter Stubbers
1655	Humphrey Hurd
1656	Paul Dodd
1657	Gabriel King
1658	Sir Charles Coote
1659	John Mathews
1660	John Morgan
1661	John Eyre
1662	Henry Greneway
1663	Edward Eyre
1664	John Morgan
1665	John Spencer (till 1668)
1669	John Peters
1670	John May
1671	Richard Ormsby
1672	Gregory Constable (till 1673)
1674	Theodore Russell (till 1685)
1686	John Kirwan (fitz Stephen) (till 1687)
1688	Dominick Browne (till 1689)
1690	Alexandar McDonnell
1691	Sir Henry Bellasyse

=== Penal era (1692–1761) ===
Year	Name
1692–1693	Thomas Revett
1694–1695	Thomas Simcokes
1696	Thomas Cartwright
1697–1698	John Gerry
1699	Thomas Andrews
1700	Richard Browne
1701–1702	Thomas Staunton
1703	James Ribett Vigie
1704–1705	John Eyre
1707	Richard Wall
1708	John Gibbs
1709	Jarvis Hinds
1710–1711	Edward Eyre
1712–1713	Samuel Eyre
1714–1714	Robert Blakeney
1716	Robert Coates
1717–1718	Mark Wall
1719–1720	Samuel Simcockes
1721–1722	William Hinde
1723	James Ribett Vigie
1724	George Gerry
1725	George Staunton
1726	Charles Gerry
1727	Charles Revett
1728	Richard Revett
1729	John Gibbs
1730	John Staunton
1731	Walter Taylor
1732	Charles Morgan
1733	Geoffrey Cooke
1734	John Bird
1735	Dominick Burke
1736	John Staunton
1737	Dominick Burke
1738	Richard FitzPatrick
1739	Henry Ellis
1740	Thomas Holland
1741	Robert Cooke
1742	John Disney
1743	Thomas Shaw
1744	George Purdon
1745	John Mills
1746	Croasdile Shaw
1747	James O'Hara
1748	James Disney
1749	John Eyre
1750	Francis Annesley
1751	James Staunton
1752	John Hamlin
1753	Ambrose Poole
1754	George Eyre Simcocks
1755	John Shaw
1756	Patrick Blake
1757	Robert Cooke
1758	Edward Sheilds
1759	Croasdaile Shaw
1760	Thomas French
1761	Charles Revett

=== Daly regime (1762–1840) ===
Year	Name
1762–1763	Charles Daly
1763–1764	Henry Ellis
1764–1765	John Eyre
1765–1766	James Daly
1766–1767	Henry White
1767–1768	John Gibson
1768–1769	Thomas Taylor
1769–1770	Denis Daly
1770–1771	Anthony Daly
1772–1773	Denis Daly
1774	
1775	Elias Tankervill
1776	George Carter
1777	James Shee
1778	Denis Daly
1799	Peter Daly
1800	Hyacinth Daly
1801	Peter Daly
1802	Hyacinth Daly
1803	Denis Bowes Daly
1804	James Daly
1805	Hyacinth Daly
1806–1807	Denis Bowes Daly
1808	Hyacinth Daly
1809	Denis Bowes Daly
1810	James Daly
1811	Hyacinth Daly
1812	Denis Bowes Daly
1813–1816	Hyacinth Daly
1817	Parnell Gale
1818–1819	James Daly
1820–1822	James Hardiman Burke
1823–1824	James Daly
1825–1829	James Hardiman Burke
1830–1836	John Blake
1836–1840	Edmond Blake

=== Mayoralty restored: Mayors since 1937 ===
Galway Corporation was abolished in 1841 under the Municipal Corporations (Ireland) Act 1840. It became an urban district under the Local Government (Ireland) Act 1898. It became a borough corporation in 1937.

==== 20th century ====
Year	Name	Party	Notes
1937–1950	Joseph J. Costello		
1950–1952	Michael O'Flaherty		
1952–1953	Michael Lydon	Fianna Fáil	
1953–1954	Joseph Owens		
1954–1960	Peter Greene		
1960–1961	James Redington		
1961–1962	Fintan Coogan Snr	Fine Gael	
1962–1963	Patrick D. Ryan		
1963–1964	Martin Divilly		
1964–1965	Patrick O'Flaherty		
1965–1966	Brendan Holland		
1966–1967	Brendan Holland		
1967–1968	Thomas Tierney		
1968–1969	Bobby Molloy	Fianna Fáil	
1969–1970	Fintan Coogan Snr	Fine Gael	
1970–1971	Martin Divilly		
1971–1972	Mickey Smyth	Labour	First member of the Labour Party to hold the office
1972–1973	Michéal Ó hUiginn	Fianna Fáil	
1973–1974	Patrick O'Flaherty		
1974–1975	Fintan Coogan Snr	Fine Gael	
1975–1976	Mary Byrne	Fianna Fáil	First female mayor
1976–1977	Gerard G. Colgan		
1977–1978	Shelia Jordan		
1978–1979	John Francis King		
1979–1980	Michéal Ó hUiginn	Fianna Fáil	
1980–1981	Bridie O'Flaherty	Fianna Fáil	
Jul–Dec 1981	Claude Toft		Died in Office
Dec 1981–1982	Michael D. Higgins	Labour	
1982–1983	Pat McNamara	Independent	
1983–1984	Michael Leahy	Fianna Fáil	
1984–1985	Mary Byrne	Fianna Fáil	
1985–1986	Bridie O'Flaherty	Fianna Fáil	Joined the Progressive Democrats while mayor
1986–1987	John Mulholland	Fine Gael	
1987–1988	Martin Connolly	Progressive Democrats	
1988–1989	Fintan Coogan Jnr	Fine Gael	
1989–1990	Angela Lupton	Fine Gael	
1990–1991	Michael D. Higgins	Labour	
1991–1992	Michael Leahy	Fianna Fáil	
1992–1993	Pádraic McCormack	Fine Gael	
1993–1994	Henry O'Connor	Fianna Fáil	
1994–1995	Fintan Coogan Jnr	Fine Gael	
1995–1996	Michéal Ó hUiginn	Fianna Fáil	
1996–1997	John Mulholland	Fine Gael	
1997–1998	Michael Leahy	Fianna Fáil	
1998–1999	Angela Lynch-Lupton	Fine Gael	
1999–2000	Declan McDonnell	Progressive Democrats	

==== 21st century ====
Year	Name	Party	Notes
2000–2001	Martin Quinn	Fianna Fáil	
2001–2002	Donal Lyons	Progressive Democrats	
2002–2003	Val Hanley	Fianna Fáil	
2003–2004	Terry O'Flaherty	Progressive Democrats	Daughter of former mayor Bridie O'Flaherty
2004–2005	Catherine Connolly	Labour	
2005–2006	Brian Walsh	Fine Gael	Youngest recorded Mayor of Galway
2006–2007	Niall Ó Brolcháin	Green	First member of the Green Party to hold the office
2007–2008	Tom Costello	Labour	
2008–2009	Pádraig Conneely	Fine Gael	
2009–2010	Declan McDonnell	Independent	
2010–2011	Michael Crowe	Fianna Fáil	
2011–2012	Hildegarde Naughton	Fine Gael	
2012–2013	Terry O'Flaherty	Independent	
2013–2014	Pádraig Conneely	Fine Gael	
2014–2015	Donal Lyons	Independent	
2015–2016	Frank Fahy	Fine Gael	
2016–2017	Noel Larkin	Independent	
2017–2018	Pearce Flannery	Fine Gael	
2018–2019	Níall McNelis	Labour	
2019–2021	Mike Cubbard	Independent	
2021–2022	Colette Connolly	Independent	
2022–2023	Clodagh Higgins	Fine Gael	
2023–2024	Eddie Hoare	Fine Gael	
2024–2025	Peter Keane	Fianna Fáil	
2025–2026	Mike Cubbard	Independent	
2026–present	Helen Ogbu	Labour	First person of colour to become Mayor of Galway

== Sources ==
- Hardiman, James (1820). History of Galway.
- Blake, Martin J. (1902). Blake Family Records. Vol. I.
