= Fintan Coogan Jnr =

Irish former politician (born 1944)

Senator
- In office 17 September 1997 – 12 September 2002
- Constituency: Administrative Panel

Teachta Dála
- In office November 1982 – February 1987
- Constituency: Galway West

Personal details
- Born: 2 June 1944 (age 82) Galway, Ireland
- Party: Fine Gael
- Parent: Fintan Coogan Snr (father)
- Education: University College Galway

Fintan A. Coogan (born 2 June 1944) is an Irish former Fine Gael politician from Galway. He was a Teachta Dála (TD) for five years, a senator for five years, and was twice Mayor of Galway.

== Early and personal life ==
The son of Fintan Coogan Snr, a long-serving TD and councillor, Coogan was educated at St. Joseph's Secondary School in Galway and graduated from University College Galway with a BA degree and a H.Dip.Ed. A lecturer in behavioural sciences at the Galway-Mayo Institute of Technology, he has also served on the boards of Galway Airport and of the Great Southern Hotels Group. He is married with three daughters and one son.

== Political career ==
Coogan followed his father into politics, becoming a member of Galway County Council and Galway City Council, and when his father died in 1984 he was appointed to succeed him as a member of the Western Health Board.

Coogan unsuccessfully sought election to Dáil Éireann in the February 1982 general election for the Galway West constituency, failing to regain the seat previously held by his father. However he succeeded at the November 1982 general election, giving Fine Gael a rare second seat in Galway West. He was defeated at the 1987 general election by Labour candidate Michael D. Higgins, whom he had ousted in 1982. He stood again at the 1989 and 1992 general elections, but never returned to the Dáil.

In 1997 he was elected to the 21st Seanad on the Administrative Panel, but was defeated at the 2002 election to the 22nd Seanad. Fine Gael had suffered heavy losses at the 2002 general election, and the party chose to prioritise younger politicians who appeared to be strong candidates for the next election to the Dáil.

Coogan was mayor of Galway city from 1988 to 1989, and 1994 to 1995. He remained a city councillor until his defeat at the 2004 local elections. At the 1999 local elections he was not selected as a candidate by his local party, was imposed by the party's national executive, and held his council seat with a majority of just two votes over his Progressive Democrats opponent, fish wholesaler Gary Creaven. The recounts extended over two nights, and when his victory was confirmed Coogan said "On the third day, he rose again", prompting The Irish Times to write an article about him under the headline "City's Lazarus claims resurrection status as he defeats provider of fish".

In a January 2008 comparison of the council elected in 2004 with its predecessor, the local Galway Advertiser newspaper gave Coogan a rating of 5 out of 10, noting that "at times he made good contributions but frequently appeared uninterested".

== See also ==
- Families in the Oireachtas

Civic offices
Preceded by Martin Connolly	Mayor of Galway; 1988–1989	Succeeded by Angela Lupton
Preceded by Henry O'Connor	Mayor of Galway; 1994–1995	Succeeded by Michéal Ó hUiginn

Dáil	Election	Deputy (Party)	Deputy (Party)	Deputy (Party)	Deputy (Party)	Deputy (Party)
9th	1937	Gerald Bartley (FF)	Joseph Mongan (FG)	Seán Tubridy (FF)	3 seats 1937–1977	
10th	1938	Gerald Bartley (FF)	Joseph Mongan (FG)	Seán Tubridy (FF)	3 seats 1937–1977	
10th	1940 by-election	Gerald Bartley (FF)	Joseph Mongan (FG)	John J. Keane (FF)	3 seats 1937–1977	
11th	1943	Gerald Bartley (FF)	Joseph Mongan (FG)	Eamon Corbett (FF)	3 seats 1937–1977	
12th	1944	Gerald Bartley (FF)	Joseph Mongan (FG)	Michael Lydon (FF)	3 seats 1937–1977	
13th	1948	Gerald Bartley (FF)	Joseph Mongan (FG)	Michael Lydon (FF)	3 seats 1937–1977	
14th	1951	Gerald Bartley (FF)	John Mannion Snr (FG)	Peadar Duignan (FF)	3 seats 1937–1977	
15th	1954	Gerald Bartley (FF)	Fintan Coogan Snr (FG)	Johnny Geoghegan (FF)	3 seats 1937–1977	
16th	1957	Gerald Bartley (FF)	Fintan Coogan Snr (FG)	Johnny Geoghegan (FF)	3 seats 1937–1977	
17th	1961	Gerald Bartley (FF)	Fintan Coogan Snr (FG)	Johnny Geoghegan (FF)	3 seats 1937–1977	
18th	1965	Bobby Molloy (FF)	Fintan Coogan Snr (FG)	Johnny Geoghegan (FF)	3 seats 1937–1977	
19th	1969	Bobby Molloy (FF)	Fintan Coogan Snr (FG)	Johnny Geoghegan (FF)	3 seats 1937–1977	
20th	1973	Bobby Molloy (FF)	Fintan Coogan Snr (FG)	Johnny Geoghegan (FF)	3 seats 1937–1977	
20th	1975 by-election	Bobby Molloy (FF)	Fintan Coogan Snr (FG)	Máire Geoghegan-Quinn (FF)	3 seats 1937–1977	
21st	1977	Bobby Molloy (FF)	John Mannion Jnr (FG)	Máire Geoghegan-Quinn (FF)	Bill Loughnane (FF)	4 seats 1977–1981
22nd	1981	Bobby Molloy (FF)	John Donnellan (FG)	Máire Geoghegan-Quinn (FF)	Mark Killilea Jnr (FF)	Michael D. Higgins (Lab)
23rd	1982 (Feb)	Bobby Molloy (FF)	John Donnellan (FG)	Máire Geoghegan-Quinn (FF)	Frank Fahey (FF)	Michael D. Higgins (Lab)
24th	1982 (Nov)	Bobby Molloy (FF)	John Donnellan (FG)	Máire Geoghegan-Quinn (FF)	Frank Fahey (FF)	Fintan Coogan Jnr (FG)
25th	1987	Bobby Molloy (PDs)	John Donnellan (FG)	Máire Geoghegan-Quinn (FF)	Frank Fahey (FF)	Michael D. Higgins (Lab)
26th	1989	Bobby Molloy (PDs)	Pádraic McCormack (FG)	Máire Geoghegan-Quinn (FF)	Frank Fahey (FF)	Michael D. Higgins (Lab)
27th	1992	Bobby Molloy (PDs)	Pádraic McCormack (FG)	Máire Geoghegan-Quinn (FF)	Éamon Ó Cuív (FF)	Michael D. Higgins (Lab)
28th	1997	Bobby Molloy (PDs)	Pádraic McCormack (FG)	Frank Fahey (FF)	Éamon Ó Cuív (FF)	Michael D. Higgins (Lab)
29th	2002	Noel Grealish (PDs)	Pádraic McCormack (FG)	Frank Fahey (FF)	Éamon Ó Cuív (FF)	Michael D. Higgins (Lab)
30th	2007	Noel Grealish (PDs)	Pádraic McCormack (FG)	Frank Fahey (FF)	Éamon Ó Cuív (FF)	Michael D. Higgins (Lab)
31st	2011	Noel Grealish (Ind.)	Brian Walsh (FG)	Seán Kyne (FG)	Éamon Ó Cuív (FF)	Derek Nolan (Lab)
32nd	2016	Noel Grealish (Ind.)	Hildegarde Naughton (FG)	Seán Kyne (FG)	Éamon Ó Cuív (FF)	Catherine Connolly (Ind.)
33rd	2020	Noel Grealish (Ind.)	Hildegarde Naughton (FG)	Mairéad Farrell (SF)	Éamon Ó Cuív (FF)	Catherine Connolly (Ind.)
34th	2024	Noel Grealish (Ind.)	Hildegarde Naughton (FG)	Mairéad Farrell (SF)	John Connolly (FF)	Catherine Connolly (Ind.)
34th	2026 by-election	Noel Grealish (Ind.)	Hildegarde Naughton (FG)	Mairéad Farrell (SF)	John Connolly (FF)	Seán Kyne (FG)
