= Robuck French =

Robuck French fitz John, Mayor of Galway 1582-83.

On 3 December 1582, Sir Nicholas Malby wrote to Dublin that the peace of the town had been threatened by a very serious quarrel between Mayor French and some of his colleagues on the town council. The matter was apparently concerning the Mayor's attempt to appoint his son, Edmond, as one of the two town bailiffs. The quarrel grew so serious that Malby bound all concerned to the peace, and stationed sixty foot soldiers from the town garrison about the town to ensure no disturbances arose.

French died in 1602, having had at least three children; Walter, Edmond (Mayor in 1606) and Margaret. The latter was the mother of Mayor Francis Blake, 1640-41.

== See also ==
- Tribes of Galway
- Galway

Civic offices
Preceded by Peter Lynch fitz Marcus	Mayor of Galway; 1582–1583	Succeeded by Nicholas French
