= Wylliam Martin =

34th Mayor of Galway

Wylliam Martin (fl. 1504-1547) was the 34th Mayor of Galway.

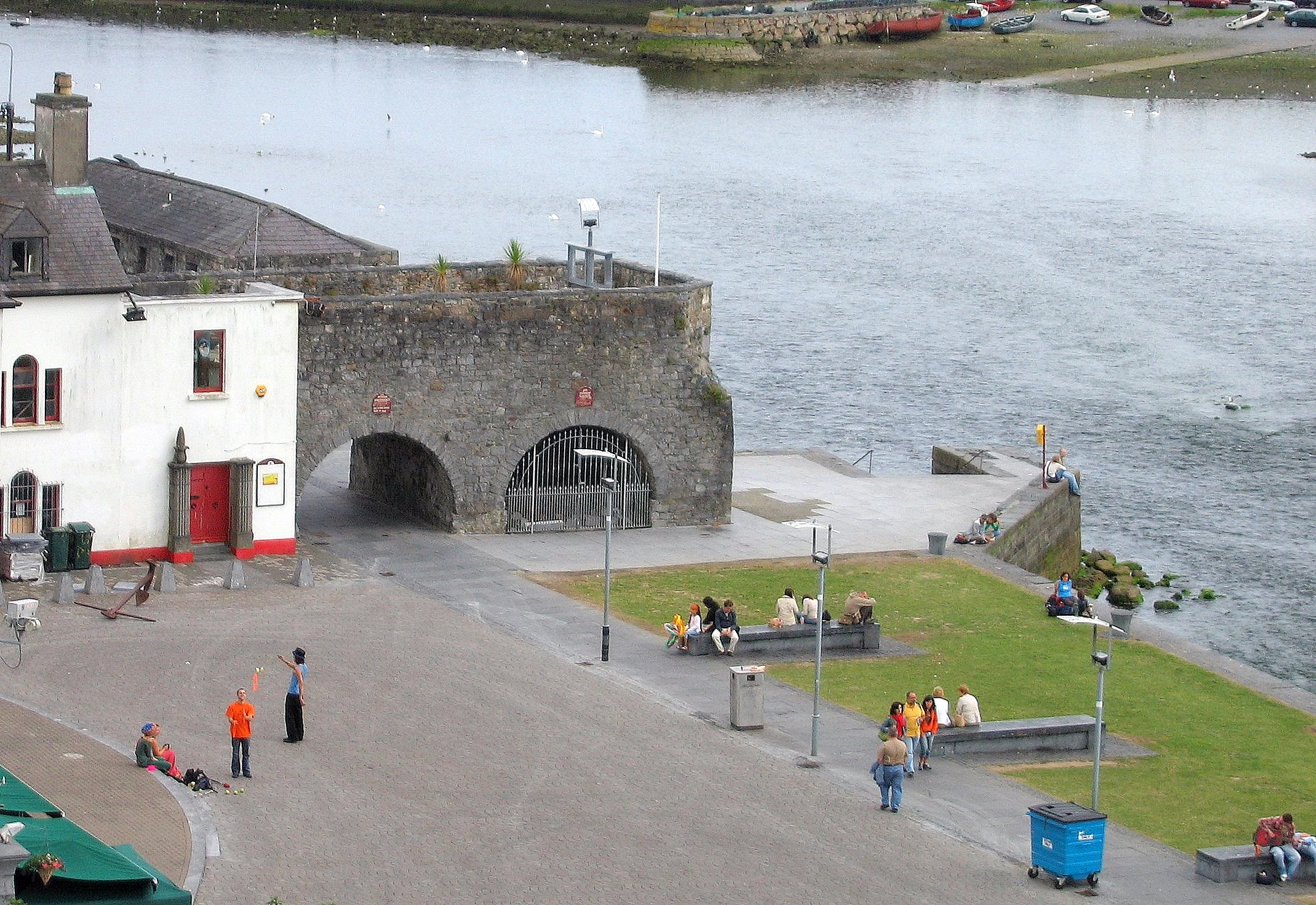
The Spanish Arch and the old town quays

Martin was a member of one of The Tribes of Galway, and had first served as a town bailiff for the term 1504-1505. He enjoyed two terms as Mayor, 1519–1520, and 1525-1526. He is noteworthy for introducing a statute concerning morality.

- It is ordered that if any man, free or unfree, be found by nighttime in any mans house to have copulation or to do with the good mans servant girl or the daughter of a merchant became pregnant, that the man responsible would have to marry or provide for her.

Martin was also responsible for the erection during his term of Ceann an Bhalla (the head of the wall). This was an extension of the town wall from Martin's Tower to the bank of the Corrib, as a measure to protect the town's quays, which were located in the area once known as the Fish Market. It is now known as the Spanish Arch.

He was the first Mayor of the Martyn family, who would ultimately produce nineteen Mayors and almost thirty Bailiffs and Sheriffs of Galway. His only known child was Thomas Óge Martyn.

== See also ==
- The Tribes of Galway

Civic offices
Preceded by John Bodkin	Mayor of Galway; 1519–1520	Succeeded by Martin Font
Preceded by Adam Font	Mayor of Galway; 1525–1526	Succeeded by Rychard Martin
