= Edmond Deane =

Edmond Deane was the 18th Mayor of Galway (1502–1504).

A member of one of The Tribes of Galway, Deane was the only member of his family to serve as the town's mayor. He is notable as one of the few who served two successive terms, as he is apparently the same man who held office from 1503 to 1504. His family, who bore the additional surname Allen, came from Bristol, where there is a record of a Mayor William Deane. The earliest references to the family in Galway occur in 1438 when a Williame Deane was town provost, while in 1562 William Allen, alias Deane, served as sovereign and collector of the customs of the port.

During his tenure he was an arbitrator settling disputes among the Blake family, and witnessed the occupation of the town by Clanricarde. This event led to the Battle of Knockdoe and the relief of Galway by the Earl of Kildare.

Civic offices
Preceded by Robuck Lynch	Mayor of Galway; 1502–1504	Succeeded by Stephen Lynch
