= Bobby Molloy =

Irish politician (1936–2016)

- Molloy in 1997

Minister of State
- 1997–2002: Environment and Local Government
- 1997–2002: Government

Minister for Energy
- In office 12 July 1989 – 4 November 1992
- Taoiseach: Charles Haughey
- Preceded by: Michael Smith
- Succeeded by: Albert Reynolds

Minister for Defence
- In office 5 July 1977 – 11 December 1979
- Taoiseach: Jack Lynch
- Preceded by: Oliver J. Flanagan
- Succeeded by: Pádraig Faulkner

Minister for Local Government
- In office 9 May 1970 – 14 March 1973
- Taoiseach: Jack Lynch
- Preceded by: Kevin Boland
- Succeeded by: James Tully

Parliamentary Secretary
- 1969–1970: Education

Teachta Dála
- In office April 1965 – May 2002
- Constituency: Galway West

Personal details
- Born: 9 July 1936 Galway, Ireland
- Died: 2 October 2016 (aged 80) Galway, Ireland
- Party: Independent
- Other political affiliations: Fianna Fáil (1965 to 1985); Progressive Democrats 1985 onwards
- Spouse: Phyllis Molloy (m. 1967)
- Children: 4
- Education: University College Galway

Robert Molloy (9 July 1936 – 2 October 2016) was an Irish politician who served as Minister of State for Housing and Urban Renewal and Minister of State to the Government from 1997 to 2002, Minister for Energy from 1989 to 1992, Minister for Defence from 1977 to 1979, Minister for Local Government from 1970 to 1973, Parliamentary Secretary to the Minister for Education from 1969 to 1970 and Mayor of Galway from 1968 to 1969. He served as a Teachta Dála (TD) for the Galway West constituency from 1965 to 2002.

== Early life ==
Molloy was born in Galway on 6 July 1936. His father, Michael Edward Molloy, was originally from Ballyhaunis, County Mayo, and ran a successful wholesale drapery business in the city. His mother, Rita Stanley, hailed from Clifden, County Galway. Molloy was educated at Coláiste Iognáid and University College Galway. Before entering politics, Molloy worked for several years in printing, the clothing industry and his family's drapery firm.

== Political career ==
=== Fianna Fáil ===
Molloy was first elected to Dáil Éireann as a Fianna Fáil TD for the Galway West constituency at the 1965 general election. In 1968, he was also elected Mayor of Galway. The following year he was appointed as Parliamentary Secretary to the Minister for Education.

Molloy's early political career was marked by his loyalty to Fianna Fáil's leadership under Taoiseach Jack Lynch. He quickly rose through the ranks and was appointed Minister for Local Government in 1970, a position he held until 1973. His tenure as Minister for Local Government was characterised by his efforts to modernise and streamline local government structures in Ireland. Molloy's tenure in Fianna Fáil saw him as a stalwart of the party's establishment, though tensions with its leadership grew over the years, particularly with Charlie Haughey.

In opposition from 1973, Molloy served as the frontbench spokesman, where he became involved in a high-profile dispute with Jim Tully, the Labour Minister for Local Government, over the controversial redrawing of constituencies, known as the "Tullymander". Molloy, along with fellow Fianna Fáil member Brendan Crinion, used Dáil privilege to accuse Tully of having an improper commercial relationship with a builder in County Meath. The accusation was strongly denied by Tully and Molloy and Crinion later withdrew the charge. Despite this, Molloy faced severe repercussions, being forced to resign from his frontbench position. He was subsequently condemned by a judicial tribunal and censured by the Dáil for abusing parliamentary privilege.

When Fianna Fáil returned to office in 1977, he became Minister for Defence in the final government of Jack Lynch.

Molloy supported George Colley in the 1979 Fianna Fáil leadership election. Charles Haughey won the contest and dropped Molloy, alongside other opponents, from the cabinet. Thereafter Molloy became a member of the Gang of 22 who opposed Haughey's leadership of the party.

=== Progressive Democrats ===
In 1986 Molloy resigned from Fianna Fáil and joined the newly formed Progressive Democrats, spearheaded by Haughey's arch-rival Desmond O'Malley. Molloy's move was seen as a major break from the political establishment, as the PDs advocated for low-tax, market-oriented economic policies and a more liberal economic agenda. Molloy's decision was driven by his dissatisfaction with the direction of Fianna Fáil under Haughey's leadership and his belief that the party had become increasingly alienating.

In 1989, Molloy contested the European Parliament elections but was unsuccessful in his attempt. Following the 1989 general election Molloy, along with newly elected MEP for Munster Pat Cox, represented the Progressive Democrats in the lengthy negotiations with Fianna Fáil to form a coalition government. Once the negotiations concluded, Molloy was reinstated in the Cabinet as Minister for Energy under Taoiseach Charles Haughey, who had previously caused Molloy's political humiliation a decade earlier. Over the following three years, Molloy and his Progressive Democrat colleague Desmond O'Malley had a working relationship with their former Fianna Fáil colleagues, though tensions grew due to resentment over their presence in the Cabinet. The issue came to a head when Molloy and O'Malley made it clear they would not serve in a Cabinet that included Brian Lenihan Snr, following his controversial remarks during the 1990 Irish presidential election about alleged phone calls to President Patrick Hillery from 1982.

In January 1992, Haughey faced further complications when Seán Doherty revealed information about the phone tapping of journalists dating back to 1982. Despite this, the coalition government ended when Albert Reynolds, Haughey's successor, called for a general election after accusing O'Malley of giving "dishonest" evidence to the Beef Tribunal. Molloy strongly denounced Reynolds’ accusation, describing it as "outrageous," and criticised him for what he perceived as a "lack of generosity" in recent North–South negotiations, in which Molloy had represented the Progressive Democrats in talks with British Unionists.

Molloy stood at the European Parliament elections again in 1994 but was again unsuccessful.

Following the 1997 general election, Molloy was part of the negotiations that led to the formation of a coalition government between the Progressive Democrats and Fianna Fáil. On that occasion, he was appointed as Minister of State at the Department of the Environment and Local Government and sat at cabinet as Minister of State to the Government.

==== Resignation and retirement ====
Molloy resigned as a minister and quit politics just before the 2002 Irish general election amid controversy surrounding his involvement in the rape case of Barbara Naughton. The controversy stemmed from a letter Molloy had sent to then Minister for Justice, John O'Donoghue, on behalf of a constituent whose relative had been convicted of rape. The letter, which requested the temporary release of the individual pending an appeal, led to public criticism. The case was high-profile, involving a Connemara man sentenced to eleven years for the systematic abuse of his young daughter. During the trial, the judge, Philip O'Sullivan, noted that someone acting on Molloy's behalf had tried to contact him in his chambers to clarify whether he had received certain correspondence from the victim's sister, which the judge described as "quite improper". In response to the backlash, Molloy resigned, describing the letter as a "human error of judgment", but insisting it was not intended to be dishonest. He retired from politics after the election.

== Political views ==
Molloy was a member of Fianna Fáil for over 20 years, but his views were not always in line with the mainstream of the party, particularly under the leadership of Charles Haughey. His decision to leave Fianna Fáil in 1986 and join the Progressive Democrats was motivated by ideological differences, notably the party's move towards a more conservative, state-controlled economy. Molloy, on the other hand, embraced a platform of fiscal conservatism, with an emphasis on reducing taxes, deregulation, and the liberalisation of the economy.

In terms of social issues, Molloy was ahead of his time in advocating for progressive policies, particularly on women's rights. In a survey conducted in 1976 by the Women's Political Association (WPA), Molloy scored among the highest of any member of the Dáil for his progressive stance on issues affecting women. He supported measures such as divorce, contraception, and family law reform, which were seen as highly controversial at the time. His responses to the WPA's questions revealed that he held views that were in stark contrast to many of his colleagues within Fianna Fáil. Molloy's progressive views on women's rights were notable, as he was the only member of Jack Lynch's cabinet who consistently supported reformist policies on issues like family law and the role of women in public life.

== Personal life ==
In 1972, Molloy married Phyllis Barry, a Montessori teacher from Foxrock, County Dublin, whose father was a cousin of the executed revolutionary Kevin Barry. The couple met while campaigning in a by-election in mid-Cork. Together, they had four children: Sinead, Sorcha, Donnacha, and Dara.

== Sources ==
- Henry, William (2002). Role of Honour: The Mayors of Galway City 1485-2001. Galway: Galway City Council. OCLC 51023721 ASIN B003NECRYW

Civic offices
Preceded by Thomas Tierney	Mayor of Galway; 1968–1969	Succeeded by Fintan Coogan Snr
Political offices
New office	Parliamentary Secretary to the Minister for Education; 1969–1970	Succeeded by Michael O'Kennedy
Preceded by Kevin Boland	Minister for Local Government; 1970–1973	Succeeded by James Tully
Preceded by Oliver J. Flanagan	Minister for Defence; 1977–1979	Succeeded by Pádraig Faulkner
Preceded by Michael Smith	Minister for Energy; 1989–1992	Succeeded by Albert Reynolds
Preceded by Pat Rabbitte	Minister of State to the Government; 1997–2002	Succeeded by Liz O'Donnell
Preceded by Liz McManus	Minister of State at the Department of the Environment and Local Government; 1997–2002	Succeeded by Noel Ahern

Dáil	Election	Deputy (Party)	Deputy (Party)	Deputy (Party)	Deputy (Party)	Deputy (Party)
9th	1937	Gerald Bartley (FF)	Joseph Mongan (FG)	Seán Tubridy (FF)	3 seats 1937–1977	
10th	1938	Gerald Bartley (FF)	Joseph Mongan (FG)	Seán Tubridy (FF)	3 seats 1937–1977	
10th	1940 by-election	Gerald Bartley (FF)	Joseph Mongan (FG)	John J. Keane (FF)	3 seats 1937–1977	
11th	1943	Gerald Bartley (FF)	Joseph Mongan (FG)	Eamon Corbett (FF)	3 seats 1937–1977	
12th	1944	Gerald Bartley (FF)	Joseph Mongan (FG)	Michael Lydon (FF)	3 seats 1937–1977	
13th	1948	Gerald Bartley (FF)	Joseph Mongan (FG)	Michael Lydon (FF)	3 seats 1937–1977	
14th	1951	Gerald Bartley (FF)	John Mannion Snr (FG)	Peadar Duignan (FF)	3 seats 1937–1977	
15th	1954	Gerald Bartley (FF)	Fintan Coogan Snr (FG)	Johnny Geoghegan (FF)	3 seats 1937–1977	
16th	1957	Gerald Bartley (FF)	Fintan Coogan Snr (FG)	Johnny Geoghegan (FF)	3 seats 1937–1977	
17th	1961	Gerald Bartley (FF)	Fintan Coogan Snr (FG)	Johnny Geoghegan (FF)	3 seats 1937–1977	
18th	1965	Bobby Molloy (FF)	Fintan Coogan Snr (FG)	Johnny Geoghegan (FF)	3 seats 1937–1977	
19th	1969	Bobby Molloy (FF)	Fintan Coogan Snr (FG)	Johnny Geoghegan (FF)	3 seats 1937–1977	
20th	1973	Bobby Molloy (FF)	Fintan Coogan Snr (FG)	Johnny Geoghegan (FF)	3 seats 1937–1977	
20th	1975 by-election	Bobby Molloy (FF)	Fintan Coogan Snr (FG)	Máire Geoghegan-Quinn (FF)	3 seats 1937–1977	
21st	1977	Bobby Molloy (FF)	John Mannion Jnr (FG)	Máire Geoghegan-Quinn (FF)	Bill Loughnane (FF)	4 seats 1977–1981
22nd	1981	Bobby Molloy (FF)	John Donnellan (FG)	Máire Geoghegan-Quinn (FF)	Mark Killilea Jnr (FF)	Michael D. Higgins (Lab)
23rd	1982 (Feb)	Bobby Molloy (FF)	John Donnellan (FG)	Máire Geoghegan-Quinn (FF)	Frank Fahey (FF)	Michael D. Higgins (Lab)
24th	1982 (Nov)	Bobby Molloy (FF)	John Donnellan (FG)	Máire Geoghegan-Quinn (FF)	Frank Fahey (FF)	Fintan Coogan Jnr (FG)
25th	1987	Bobby Molloy (PDs)	John Donnellan (FG)	Máire Geoghegan-Quinn (FF)	Frank Fahey (FF)	Michael D. Higgins (Lab)
26th	1989	Bobby Molloy (PDs)	Pádraic McCormack (FG)	Máire Geoghegan-Quinn (FF)	Frank Fahey (FF)	Michael D. Higgins (Lab)
27th	1992	Bobby Molloy (PDs)	Pádraic McCormack (FG)	Máire Geoghegan-Quinn (FF)	Éamon Ó Cuív (FF)	Michael D. Higgins (Lab)
28th	1997	Bobby Molloy (PDs)	Pádraic McCormack (FG)	Frank Fahey (FF)	Éamon Ó Cuív (FF)	Michael D. Higgins (Lab)
29th	2002	Noel Grealish (PDs)	Pádraic McCormack (FG)	Frank Fahey (FF)	Éamon Ó Cuív (FF)	Michael D. Higgins (Lab)
30th	2007	Noel Grealish (PDs)	Pádraic McCormack (FG)	Frank Fahey (FF)	Éamon Ó Cuív (FF)	Michael D. Higgins (Lab)
31st	2011	Noel Grealish (Ind.)	Brian Walsh (FG)	Seán Kyne (FG)	Éamon Ó Cuív (FF)	Derek Nolan (Lab)
32nd	2016	Noel Grealish (Ind.)	Hildegarde Naughton (FG)	Seán Kyne (FG)	Éamon Ó Cuív (FF)	Catherine Connolly (Ind.)
33rd	2020	Noel Grealish (Ind.)	Hildegarde Naughton (FG)	Mairéad Farrell (SF)	Éamon Ó Cuív (FF)	Catherine Connolly (Ind.)
34th	2024	Noel Grealish (Ind.)	Hildegarde Naughton (FG)	Mairéad Farrell (SF)	John Connolly (FF)	Catherine Connolly (Ind.)
34th	2026 by-election	Noel Grealish (Ind.)	Hildegarde Naughton (FG)	Mairéad Farrell (SF)	John Connolly (FF)	Seán Kyne (FG)
