= Michéal Ó hUiginn =

Irish politician

Mayor of Galway
- In office 1995–1996
- Preceded by: Fintan Coogan Jnr
- Succeeded by: John Mulholland

Mayor of Galway
- In office 1979–1980
- Preceded by: John Francis King
- Succeeded by: Bridie O'Flaherty

Mayor of Galway
- In office 1972–1973
- Preceded by: Mickey Smyth
- Succeeded by: Patrick O'Flaherty

Personal details
- Born: 1942 (age 83–84)
- Party: Fianna Fáil
- Education: Galway University

Michéal Ó hUiginn (born 1942) was the Mayor of Galway on three separate occasions: from 1972–1973, 1979–1980, and 1995–1996.

Ó hUiginn's family were based on Father Griffin Road, on the west bank of the Corrib. He was the eldest of five children and graduated from Galway University with a B.Comm. in 1963. The following year his father died and Ó hUiginn took over the family building business. At the same time, he was co-opted to serve on the city council to fill the vacancy left by his father's death. Aged twenty-two, he was its then youngest member. He was a member of the Fianna Fáil party.

His last official function for that term was to welcome President of Ireland Erskine Childers to Galway on 29 June 1973, to open the Leisureland complex, which had cost IR£1.3m.

His second term, 1979–1980, was marked by the Irish visit of Pope John Paul II. On Sunday 30 September 1979 the Pope arrived in Galway, celebrating mass for at Ballybrit racecourse for three hundred thousand people. Ó hUiginn conferred the Freedom of Galway upon the Pontiff.

His third term was plagued with problems concerning the long-overdue and controversial sewage treatment plant on Mutton Island, which had been dragging on since 1982. Work would only begin on the project in 1999. One notable high-point was the opening of the newly refurbished Town Hall Theatre, which he opened jointly with Michael D. Higgins. He held a civic reception for Irish Olympian, Francie Barrett, and conferred the Freedom of Galway on President of National University of Ireland, Galway, Colm Ó hEocha.

Civic offices
Preceded by Mickey Smyth	Mayor of Galway; 1972–1973	Succeeded by Patrick O'Flaherty
Preceded by John Francis King	Mayor of Galway; 1979–1980	Succeeded by Bridie O'Flaherty
Preceded by Fintan Coogan Jnr	Mayor of Galway; 1995–1996	Succeeded by John Mulholland
