= Dominick Dubh Lynch =

Irish mayor

Dominick Dubh Lynch (died 14 August 1508), was the second Mayor of Galway.

A member of The Tribes of Galway, Lynch was instrumental in securing the Mayoralty for Galway from Richard III, his brother Peirce becoming the town's first Mayor in September 1485. He himself served as Mayor 1486–87, and 1497–98.

His other achievements included gaining collegiate status for St. Nicholas's church, thus making the town ecclesiastically independent. He funded the construction of what would become the church's south aisle and the building of a college house for the clergy. He was married twice; first to Anastasia Martin, second to a woman called Juliane. His known children were John, Stephen, Gabriel, Peter, Kathleen, Anastasia and Agnes. His will detailed his properties, bequests, merchandise, as well as large sums of silver and gold. His son Stephen served four times as Mayor.

Civic offices
| Preceded by Peirce Lynch | Mayor of Galway; 1486–1487 | Succeeded by John Blake |
| Preceded by Walter Lynch | Mayor of Galway; 1497–1498 | Succeeded by Andrew Lynch |
