= Peirce Lynch =

Peirce Lynch, alias Peter Lynch, fl. 1485–1486, was the first Mayor of Galway.

The son of John Lynch fitz Edmond, as well as a brother of Dominick Dubh Lynch, and a member of one of The Tribes of Galway, Peirce became the first Mayor of Galway in August 1485, being succeeded by his brother Dominck in August 1486. His grandfather, Edmond Lynch, was Sovereign of Galway in the years 1434 and 1443. Their ancestor, Thomas de Linche, was provost of Galway in 1274. Descendants of the family continued to hold office regularly up to 1654.

== See also ==
- Tribes of Galway
- Galway

Civic offices
New office	Mayor of Galway; 1485–1486	Succeeded by Dominick Dubh Lynch
