= Bodkin (surname) =

Bodkin is an Irish surname of Norman origin. It was one of the 14 merchant families that made up the Tribes of Galway. Notable people with the surname include:

- Amby Bodkin (fl. 1777–1795), Irish lawyer and duelist
- Archibald Bodkin (1862–1957), English lawyer and Director of Public Prosecutions
- Christopher Bodkin (died 1572), Irish prelate, Archbishop of Tuam and Bishop of Kilmacduagh
- Dominic Fursey Bodkin (1843–1929), Irish-Australian Catholic priest
- Dominick Dáll Bodkin (died 1740), Irish mass murderer
- Frances Bodkin (born 1937), Australian botanist
- J. Alexander Bodkin, American psychiatrist
- John Bodkin (disambiguation), various people
- Joseph Bodkin (1902–1950), Australian politician
- Matt Bodkin (born 1968), English footballer
- Matthias McDonnell Bodkin (1850–1933), Irish MP, author, journalist, newspaper editor, barrister and judge
- Matthias Bodkin (1896–1973), Irish Jesuit priest and author, son of the above
- Maud Bodkin (1875–1967), British classical scholar
- Michael Bodkin (referee), Irish hurling referee
- Odds Bodkin (born 1953), pseudonym of an American storyteller, musician, and author
- Peter Bodkin (1924–1994), English cricketer
- Richard Bodkin, mayor of Galway (1610–1611)
- Shane Bodkin, mayor of Carlingford (1830–1844)
- Teresina Bodkin (died 2025), Montserrat teacher and civil servant, first woman Speaker (2010–2014) of Montserrat's Legislative Council
- Thomas Bodkin (1887–1961), Irish lawyer, art historian, art collector and curator
- Thomas Bodkin (mayor), mayor of Galway (1506–1507)
- Tom Bodkin, American newspaper designer
- William Bodkin (judge) (1791–1874), British barrister and politician
- William Bodkin (New Zealand politician) (1885–1964)

Fictional characters include:

- Monty Bodkin, a recurring character in P. G. Wodehouse novels

== See also ==
- Botkin, a surname
