= Bodkin =

Bodkin may refer to:

== People ==
- Bodkin (surname), a list of people and one fictional character

== Sharp implements ==
- A dagger
- Bodkin point, a type of arrowhead
- Bodkin needle, a variety of sewing needle
- Lawyers bodkin, a type of hole puncher
- A weavers bodkin, an instrument used in basketry to part tightly woven material.

== Places ==
- Bodkin, U.S. Virgin Islands, a settlement on Saint Croix
- Bodkin Island, Maryland, United States – see Bodkin Island Light
- Bodkin Hazel Wood, a Site of Special Scientific Interest in England

== Literature and the arts ==
- Bodkin Ras, 2016 Dutch-Belgian film
- Bodkin (TV series), 2024 American series set in Ireland

== Other ==
- One of the fourteen Tribes of Galway

== See also ==
- Botkin, a surname
- Odds bodkins (disambiguation)
