= Tomás Bobhdacing =

Tomás Bobhdacing, founder of the Bodkin family of The Tribes of Galway, fl. c. 1300.

== Biography ==
Bobhdacing was a descendant of Maurice FitzGerald, Lord of Lanstephan (c. 1100 – 1 September 1176), whose immediate ancestors took part in the Anglo-Irish invasion and settlement of Connacht in the late 1230s under Richard Mor de Burgh (c. 1194 – 1242). Maurice's grandson, Richard fitz Thomas held substantial property in Connacht by 1242, and his son, Tomás, earned the nickname Bobhdacing or Bodkin by which the family came to be known.

Dubhaltach MacFhirbhisigh states that:

"Tomás Bobhdacing, who was reared in Áth na Ríogh {Athenry} by Bobhdacing; from his rearing by him they are called 'Boidicín', and are of the lineage of Muiris mac Gearalt mac Muiris Mór."

MacFhirbhisigh goes on to relate that they were kindred of the Mac Morris family of Brize, County Mayo, who derived their surname from another Maurice fitz Gerald, also descended from the first Maurice fitz Gerald. A branch of this family would also become one of The Tribes of Galway, their first Mayor been William Morris, fl. 1527–28.

In his History of Galway, James Hardiman gives a different version:

"This family name originated, according to tradition, from a victory gained by their great progenitor, Thomas Fitz Richard (about the year 1300,) over a valiant Irish knight, whom he encountered in single combat, and having, in the conflict, made use of a short spear or weapon, in Irish called, a Baudekin, he was, from that circumstance, surnamed, Buaidh Baudekin, of the victory of the Bodkin, which name was afterwards retained by his descendants. Whatever doubt may attend this traditionary relation, none can exist as to the origin and descent of the family, which are fully ascertained by the testimony of antiquaries, by ancient stone sculptures and monuments, still remaining, and from the genealogies of the Geraldines, whose arms the Bodkin family bore for many generations, and whose motto, Crom aboo, they retain to this day.

== Notable descendants ==
Notable descendants of Bobhdacing include:

- Amby Bodkin, lawyer and duelist, fl. 1777 – 1795.
- Christopher Bodkin Archbishop of Tuam, fl. late 16th-century.
- Dominick Dáll Bodkin, murderer, executed 8 October 1740.
- Manuel Antonio Flórez Maldonado Martínez Ángulo y Bodquín, admiral in the Spanish navy and viceroy of New Granada (1776 – 1781) and New Spain (1787 – 1789).
- John Bodkin fitz Richard, Mayor of Galway, 1518–1519.
- John Bodkin fitz Dominick, Mayor of Galway, 1639–40.
- John Bodkin, Roman Catholic warden of Galway, died 1710
- John Bodkin (c. 1720 – 1742), Belclare, Co Galway, executed 1742.
- Leo Bodkin, writer and soldier, 1879 – 30 August 1919.
- Matthias McDonnell Bodkin, Nationalist M.P., 8 October 1850 – 7 June 1933.
- Michael Bodkin, lover of Nora Barnacle, c. 1888 – 11 February 1900.
- Thomas Bodkin, Mayor of Galway, fl. 1506–1507.
- Irene Lynch, née Bodkin, 1911–2011, centenarian.
- Martin Quinn, Mayor of Galway, 2000–2001.
- Michael Bodkin, GAA inter-county referee, fl. 2010.

== See also ==
- Athenry
- The Tribes of Galway
- Mayors of Galway
- History of Galway
- Sieges of Galway
