= Ireland's Eye =

Marine island in County Dublin, Ireland

Native name: Inis Mac Neasáin
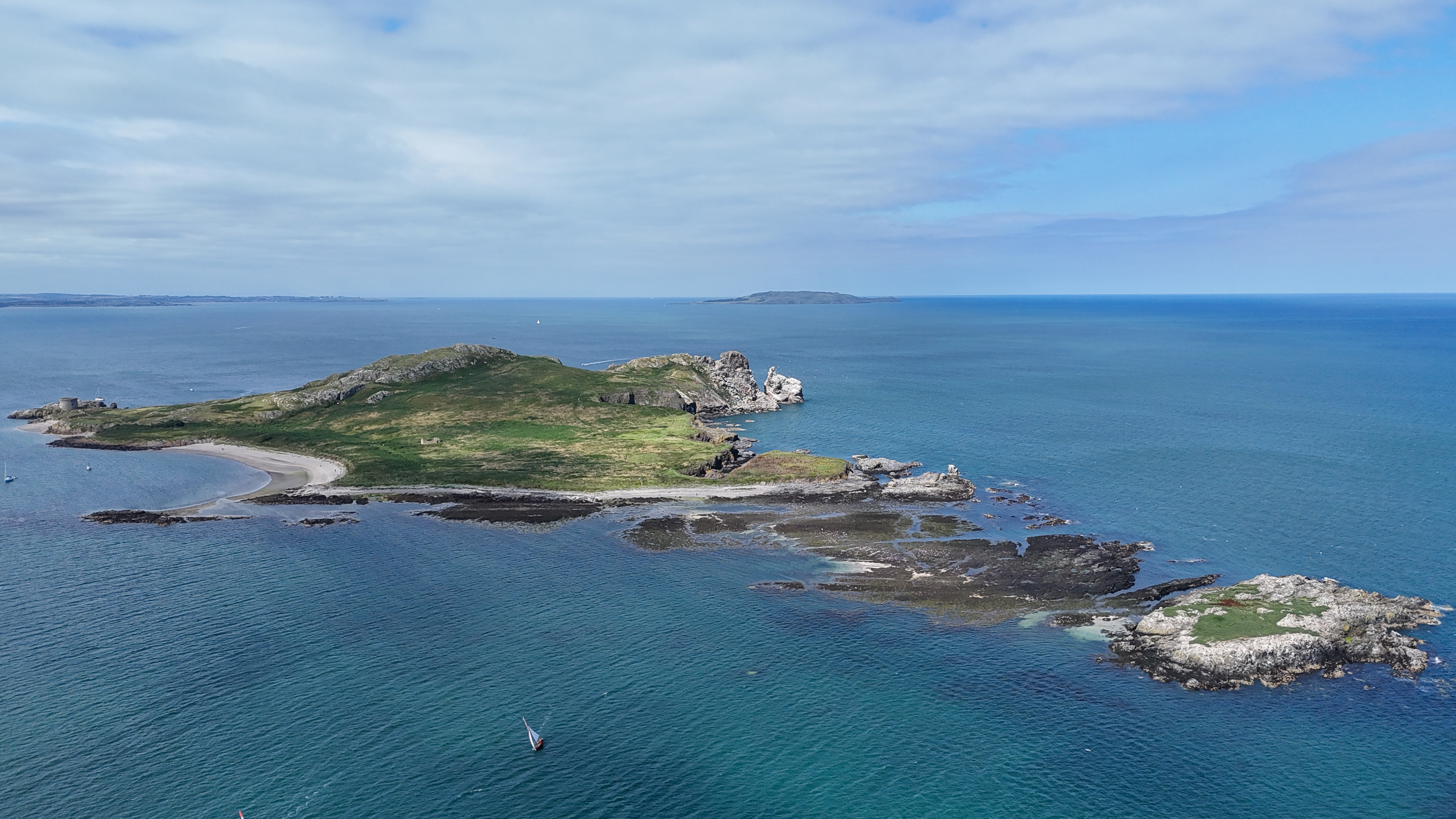
- Ireland's Eye

- Location within Dublin

Geography
- Location: Irish Sea
- Coordinates: 53°24′19″N 6°03′49″W
- Area: 0.22 km^{2} (0.085 sq mi)
- Highest elevation: 69 m (226 ft)

Administration
- Ireland
- Province: Leinster
- County: County Dublin
- Local government area: Fingal

Demographics
- Population: 0 (2016)

Additional information
- Special Area of Conservation (SAC), Special Protection Area (SPA), within Special Amenity Area and UNESCO Dublin Bay Biosphere; Owner: Tetrarch Investment Group

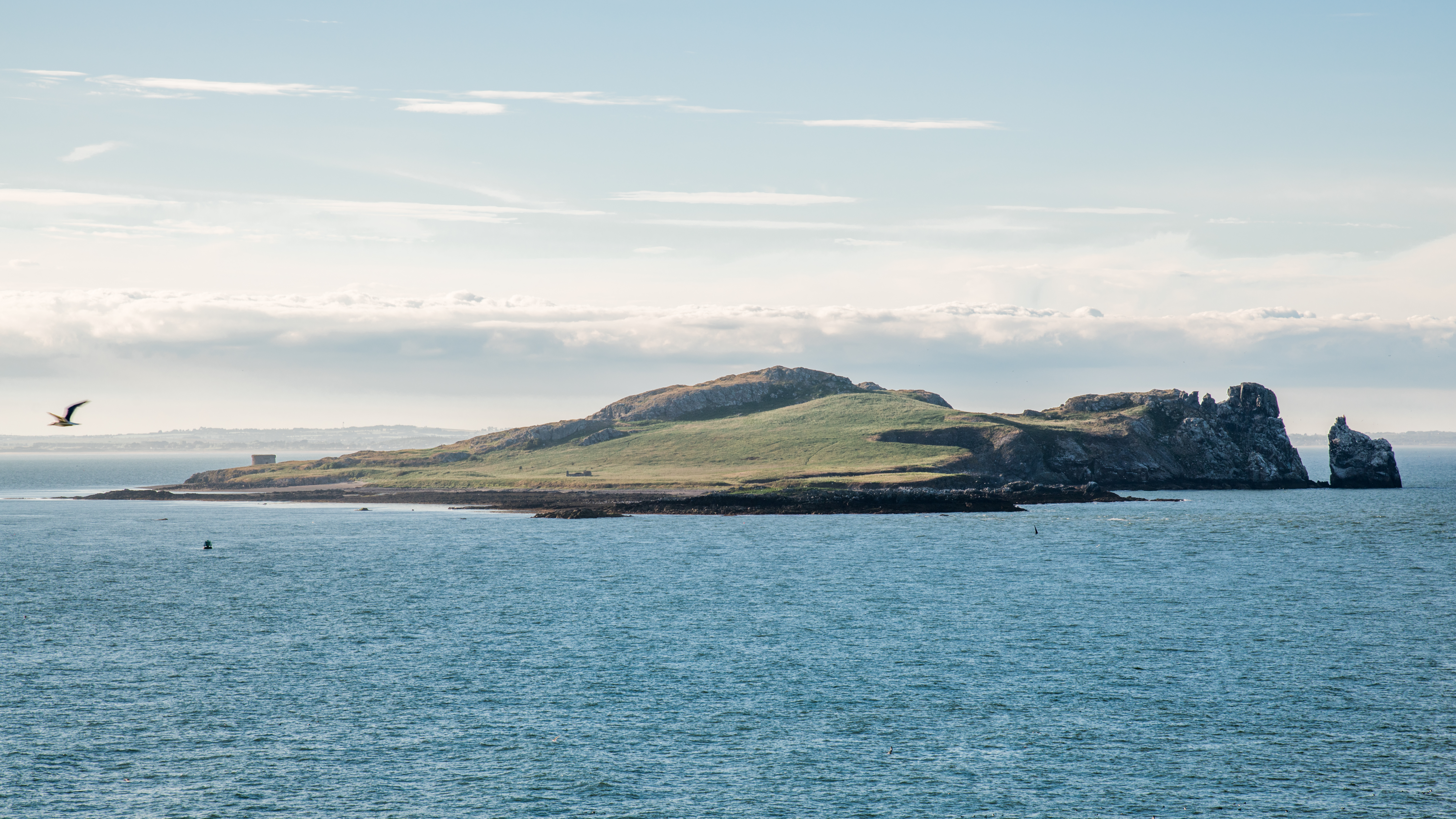
Irelands Eye Island Viewpoint From Howth

Ireland's Eye (Irish: Inis Mac Neasáin) is a small long-uninhabited island off the coast of County Dublin, Ireland. In ancient times it was called 'Adros' by Ptolemy, 'Adrea Deserta' by Pliny, and 'Andros' and 'Edria' by other early navigators. Colloquially called "the Eye", the island is situated directly north of Howth village and harbour and is easily reached by regular seasonal tourist boats, which both circumnavigate it and drop off day trippers. There is a yacht anchorage on its north side, and kayakers can also land.

The island is formed from quartzite, greywacke, and some sandstone, and has soils based on glacial drift. It is home to nationally significant bird populations, notably of guillemots, razorbills, kittiwakes, cormorants, and gulls, as well as modest numbers of puffins and peregrine falcons. There is a colony of grey seals, the surrounding waters also host harbour seals and harbour porpoise, while on land there are rats and rabbits. There is a range of plants, including some rare species and some specific to vegetated cliffs. The island has been essentially uninhabited for centuries but holds the ruins of an early church and a Martello tower.

The Eye is the basis for both a Special Area of Conservation and a Special Protection Area, and is incorporated within the Howth Special Amenity Area and the Dublin Bay Biosphere, among other designations. It is now part of Fingal for administrative purposes, having earlier been moved from the jurisdiction of the city of Dublin to County Dublin along with Howth, Sutton, Baldoyle, and Kilbarrack. The island was for centuries a possession of the Archdiocese of Dublin, and then a component of the Howth Estate. It was sold to the Tetrarch investment group as part of a deal finalised in 2019.

== Etymology ==
The name of the island is often assumed to be related to the eye, but it has a quite different origin. According to Patrick Weston Joyce in Irish Local Names Explained (1870), the island was originally called Inis Éireann ("Éire's Island"). Éire was both a female name and the Irish-language name for Ireland. Joyce says that the Vikings translated this to Ireland's Ey, with ey being the Old Norse word for "island".

The traditional Irish name of the island was Inis mac Nessan, now Inis Mac Neasáin, "island of the sons of Neasán". This was historically Anglicized as 'Inishmacnessan' and called in Latin Insula Filiorum Nessani. The island has also been known in the past as Inis Faithlenn, "the grassy island".

== Nature ==
=== Location and structure ===
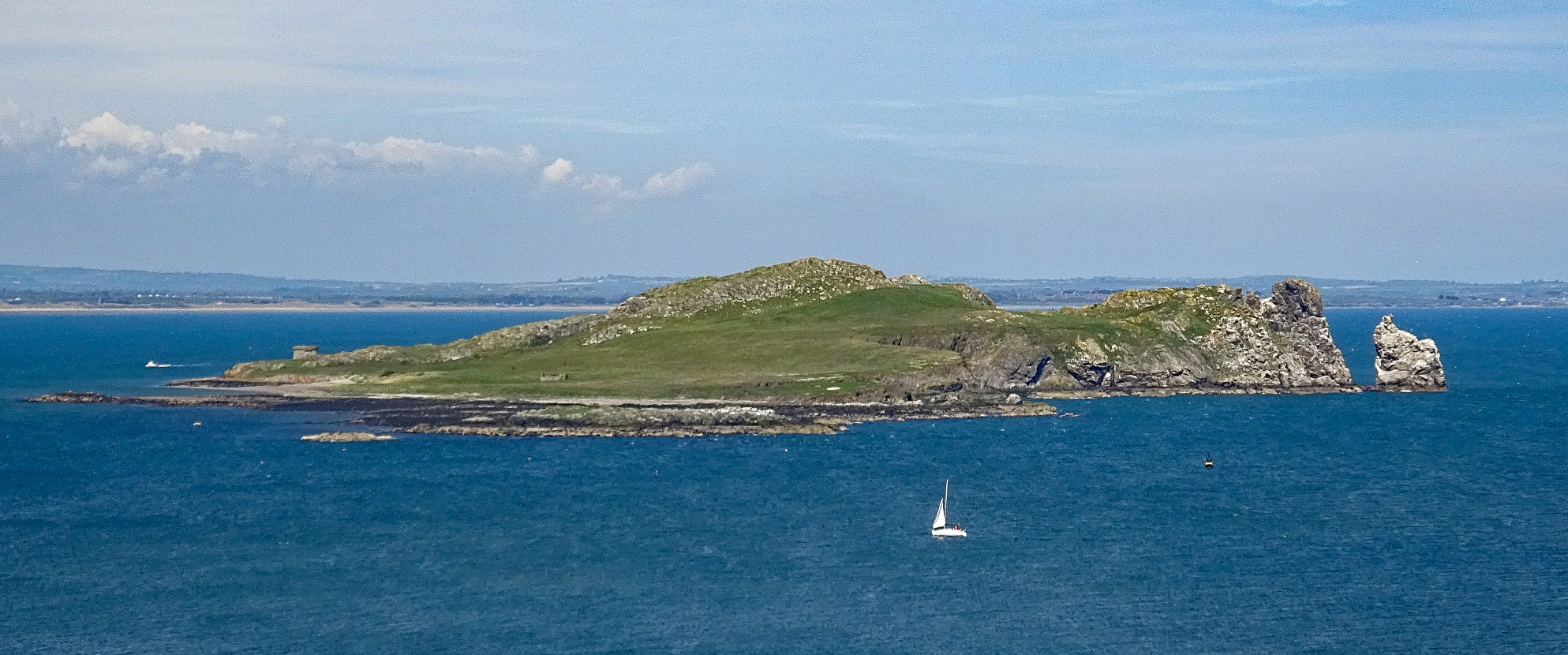
Ireland's Eye from the SSE

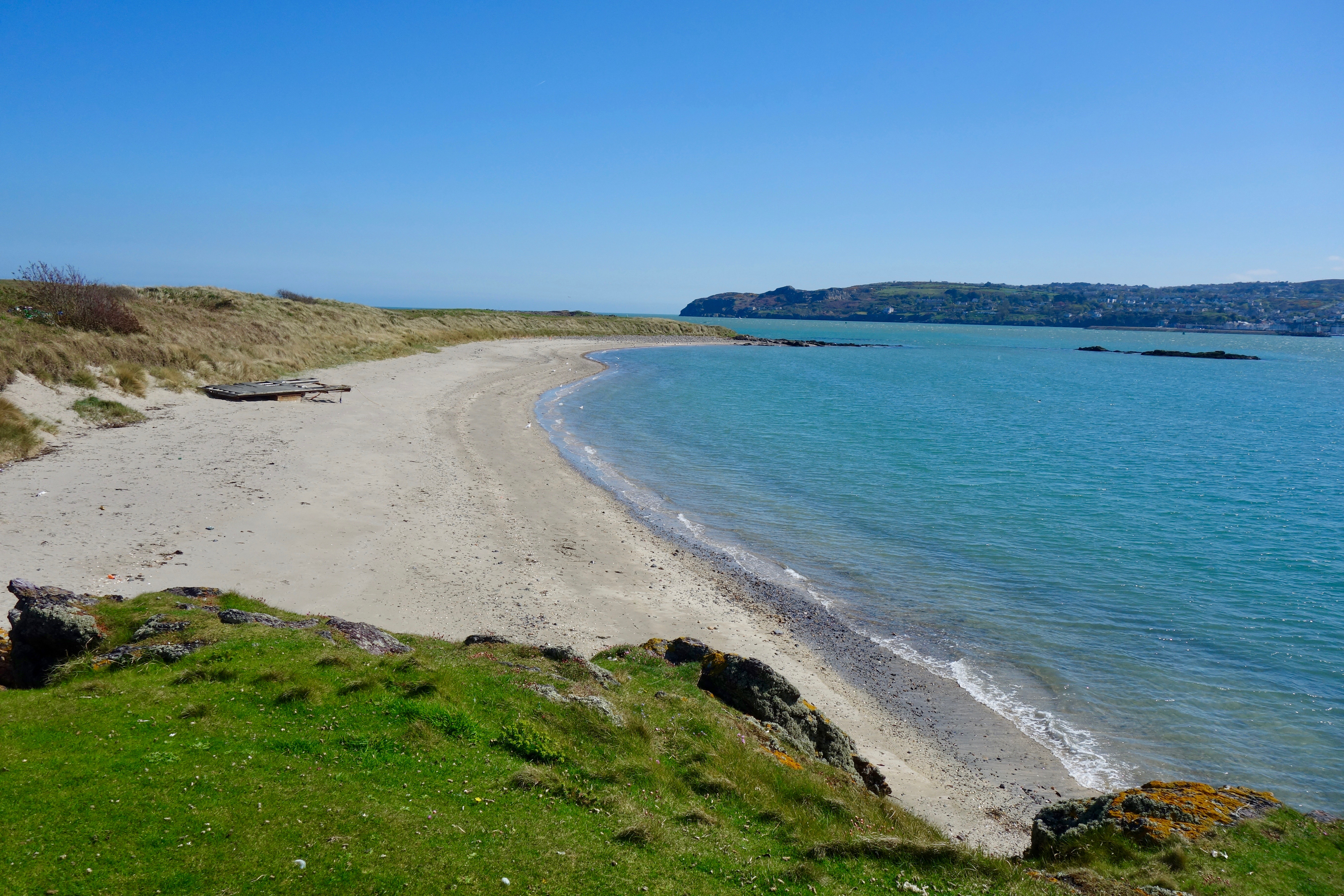
Beach at Carrigeen Bay

Ireland's Eye occupies a prominent site off Howth Head and is a feature of the Howth village and harbour area. It comprises the main island, a range of sea stacks and rocks and a grassy islet, (the) Thulla. The Eye lies 1,200–1,500 metres from Howth Harbour and around 13 km from Dublin city centre. The main island is roughly triangular, the points lying to the northwest, northeast and south, and around 600–700 metres along the edges. The terrain slopes broadly downhill from north to south, and to some extent from northeast to southwest. The most prominent feature is a sea stack called "the Steer", at the northwestern corner of the island, while at the northeastern point is a group of rocks or small sea stacks known as "the Stags". Closer to the Steer than the Stags on the northern coast is Seal's Cave, one of several sea caves. On the south-southwestern face of the island is Carrigeen Bay, with a sandy beach, and above that a shingle beach. Linked by a line of shelving rocks, exposed at low tide ("drying rocks"), the grass-surfaced islet of Thulla lies south of the main island, and the Rowan Rocks to the southeast and east of cliffs on the eastern aspect of the Eye. Also on the eastern coast are two inlets, Samper Hole nearer the Stags, and the longer and narrow Long Hole just north of the rocks linking the main island to Thulla. Between the island and Baldoyle Spit off Portmarnock Point is Howth Sound, and to the southwest the channel between the island and Howth Harbour, while in all other directions open sea extends for kilometres. The main island has sea-level coast on the western side, but on the east cliffs are 10s of metres high, while the island's highest point is about 69m above sea level. In total, there are just over 2.5 kilometres of cliff. Thulla is at most two metres above the water.

=== Geology, hydrology and climate ===
Ireland's Eye and its associated rocks are formed from Cambrian quartzite and greywacke, notably visible in the steep cliffs on the northern and eastern faces of the main island. The visible sections display faulting and folding. The island, and Howth Head, lie at the northern end of the Bray geological series. Three lithostratic groups exist in the bedrock of the island, being, south-to-north, the Thulla Formation, the Carrigeen Formation and the Steer Formation; these have parallels in three of the five formations comprising the bedrock of Howth Head, in the Nose of Howth group. Sandstone is also present, and the sea stacks are primarily formed from quartzite and sandstone. Embedded in the bedrock are a small range of minerals. Full fossils are scarce but there is a reasonable presence of trace fossils.

Above the bedrock are deposits of glacial drift, from which the island's soils are also formed. The soils are siliceous and acidic. At Carrigeen Bay are sand and shingle, developing into low sand hills inland, with modest presence of marram-bound dune.

There are no streams on the Eye but the island has one known regular spring, located 145 metres southeast of the site chosen for the Martello Tower. This spring was once substantial enough to fill a small pond, but the area around it has become sedimented and overgrown.

The climate is similar to that of coastal Fingal, with a mean air temperature of 12 degrees Celsius. Summer has notable occurrence of westerly winds, while easterly winds are more common from February to May, but the overall leading winds are from the southwest.

=== Habitats, fauna and flora ===
==== Habitats ====
In a survey in 2016, 11 land habitats and 4 maritime were identified; the marine aspect includes both intertidal and subtidal reefs, on the eastern edge of the island and in nearby waters. The terrestrial habitats include two types of grassland, three types of marsh, two rock types, two beach types, the stonework of the two buildings, and the dominant habitat, dense bracken cover with a bramble understorey.

==== Flora ====
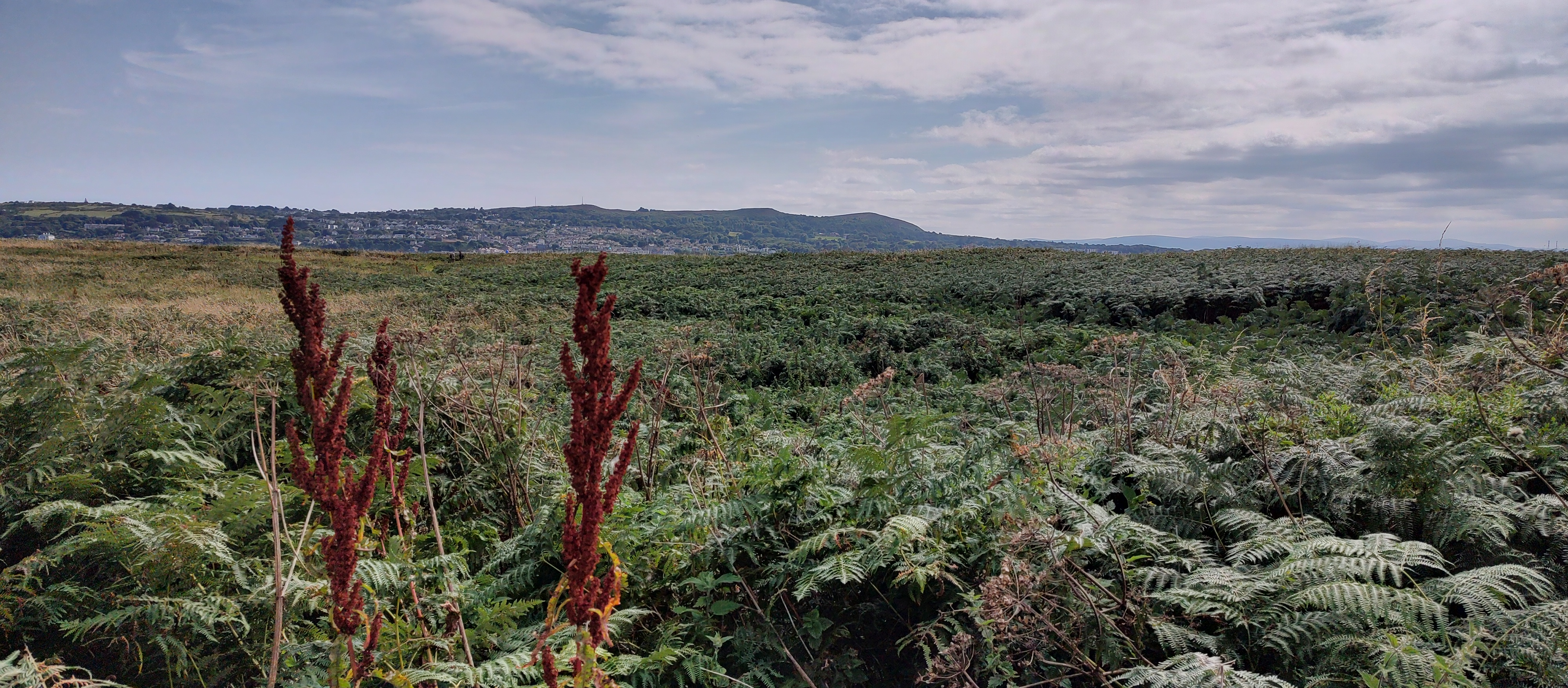
Typical flora on Ireland's Eye

The flora of the island differs considerably from that of Howth, partly due to island conditions, and to the large bird population and resulting guano. The primary vegetation types are bracken and dry grassland, notably of red fescue grass. Among the bracken plants are nettle, false oat-grass and hogweed, as well as some woodland species, lesser celandine and lords-and-ladies, and with rosebay willow herb (also known as fireweed) found at the edges of bracken patches. Bluebells and dog-violet are joined on thinner soils by the rare spring squill, and also mouse-ear and knotted clover. In some areas spear thistle and creeping thistle, and cow parsley, are also found. Elder and sycamore trees are found in small volume, and some rusty willow, ash, prunus and pyrus examples also.

Additional plant types are found near and on the cliffs, including rock samphire, rock spurrey, tree mallow and sea lavender, as well as the uncommon sea stock's-bill. In the exposed rocky areas near the cliffs, and on the cliff faces, there are also numbers of biting and English stonecrop. Near the beach are also found prickly saltwort and the rare and "near-threatened" henbane, and in an area of coastal grassland, Portland spurge and the spring squill. In at least one shingle area is some lyme-grass, and shingle areas also manifest sea mayweed, wild pansy and sea sandwort. The shingle areas are enriched by deposition of seaweed while having high soil salinity. Within the small area of sand dune, aside from the anchoring marram grass, there are examples of sea rocket, sea spurge, sea radish, curled dock and common stork's-bill, and more, as well as the acidic indicator plant, mouse-ear hawkweed. At the inner boundary of the sand and shingle areas is found a fairly rare plant, Campion hybrid. A rare variety of sea kale, listed among Red List vascular plants, has been seen historically, while a small number of invasive species, including stinking iris, montbretia and Japanese rose, have been observed.

The two historic buildings form a habitat zone of their own, and feature plants such as wall barley, sea fern-grass, dog-rose and dandelion, with the vicinity of the church also holding common orache. In the area of damp grassland around the natural spring site are plants typical of such terrain, and others fitting the marsh profile, indicating a history of greater waterflow. Specifically, there are examples of soft and common spike-rush, water starwort, pink water-speedwell and creeping buttercup. Brackish water seepage is indicated in at least one small area of saltmarsh, and leads to the presence of species such as saltmarsh-grass, saltmarsh rush, sea-milkwort, lesser sea-spurrey, brookweed and distant sedge.

The major fire of 2015, which especially affected the southeast of the island, allowed a few specific plants, such as changing forget-me-not, sticky mouse-ear and prickly sow-thistle, to flourish. It also provided visibility of the way the vegetation of the island spreads and recovers, notably the dominant bracken scrub. At least one invasive species, Bilbao's fleabane, was also spotted in thinner areas of bracken.

==== Birds ====
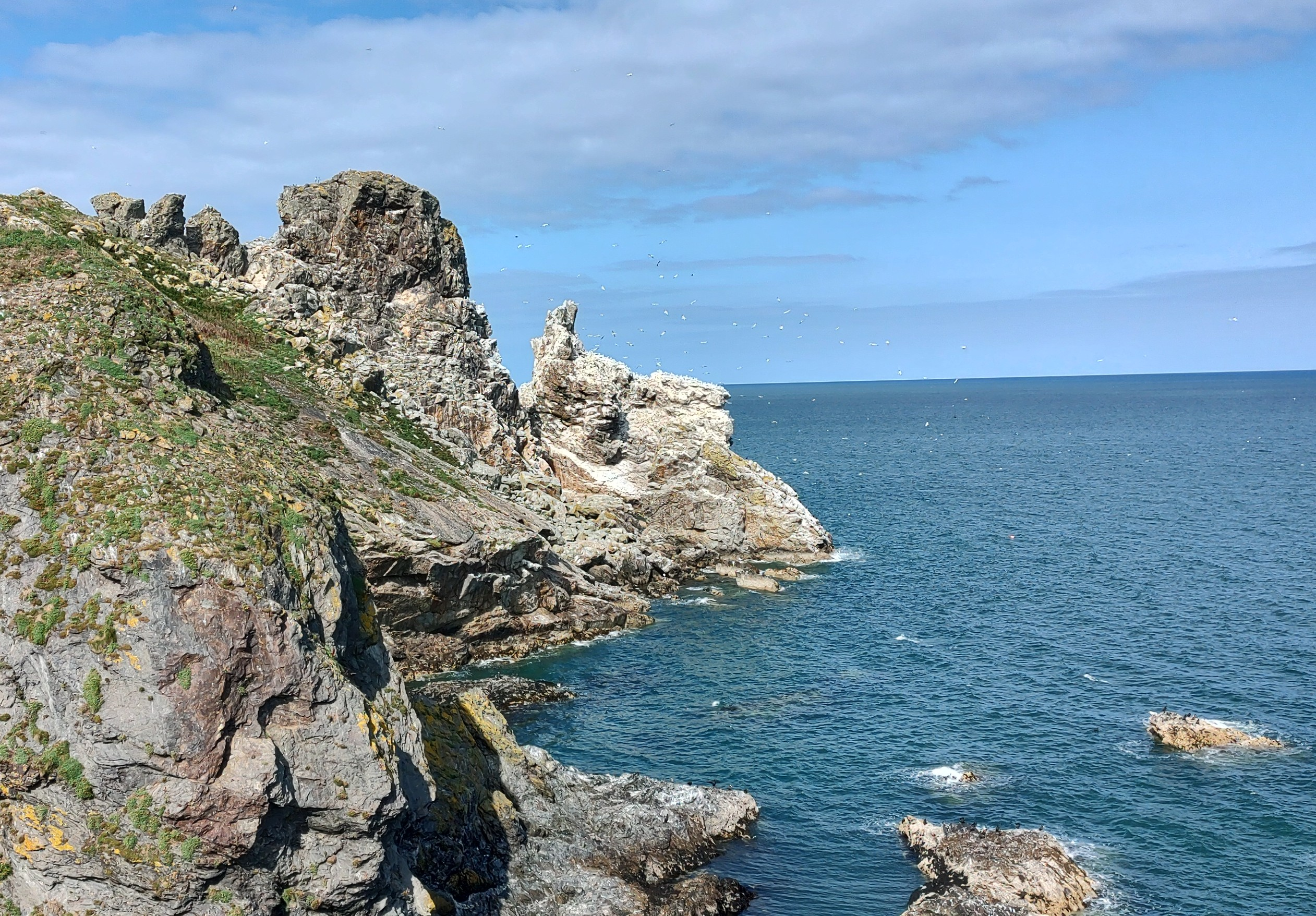
The Stack, Ireland's Eye - Various birds nesting

The island as a whole, and especially the Steer sea stack, host a large variety of seabirds, some with nationally significant populations. As of the last published survey, ten species of seabird and at least twelve other species bred there, and a dozen more species were observed.

The island is a protected area, and seasonal visitor numbers are modest, leaving the birds little disturbed. Between 2016 and the previous major survey the population of three species of seabird had increased sharply, and others modestly, a couple were stable, and two had declined a little. As of the most recent multi-month study, in 2016, there are more than 4,000 guillemots and 1,000 razorbills, and hundreds of pairs of kittiwakes, cormorants and European herring gulls. Smaller numbers of fulmars, shag and great black-backed gull are also found, as well as some lesser black-backed gulls. There were observations of black guillemot and Manx shearwater, but these species have not been observed to breed on the island. Ireland's fifth gannet colony became established on the Stack around 1989, and there were subsequently more than 100 pairs breeding there each year. There are also up to a dozen breeding pairs of puffins, which used to be common; the Eye remains the best site to see these birds in Dublin.

A limited number of peregrine falcons are found. In the 18th and early 19th century, goshawks were noted as building their nests here, but they are not listed in modern bird surveys covering Ireland's Eye. Among non-passerine species, a few shelduck and oystercatcher are routinely observed, as well as ringed plover. At least 17 passerine species have been counted, 8 definitely breeding on the island; examples include the hooded crow, rock pipit, stonechat, wren, blackbird and reed bunting. In 2016, for the first time, robins were observed to be breeding.

Two breeds of goose overwinter on the island, greylag and pale-bellied Brent geese. Other visiting or winter-passage species include the short-eared owl and the sandwich tern.

==== Other fauna ====
Grey seals are abundant in the sea around the island, and haul out on rocks, as well as living in sea caves on the northern face and around the northeast. It is believed that a colony of 270 to around 350 seals exists on and between the Eye and Lambay Island. Harbour seals are also seen, though in much smaller numbers. Harbour porpoise are also present in the waters off the island in material numbers. There is also a population of brown rats, against which control measures are supposed to be carried out annually, and there are rabbits, burrowing primarily in dry grassland areas. A previous population of foxes, noted in the 19th century, died out.

No specific studies of the invertebrates of Ireland's Eye appear to have been carried out. One spider species, Tegenaria domestica, is mentioned in scholarly papers – it is a common domestic variety, which may speak to past habitation. A study of areas of scientific interest in County Dublin recorded the presence of notable ant populations in western Ireland's Eye and Red Rock on Howth Head. Within these populations were, over decades, scientifically significant numbers of aberrant form red ants from at least one species, later renamed as Myrmica sabrinodis, and another sub-species, in modern taxonomy placed under Myrmica rubra. The aberration involved confused body parts, with male ants with some female attributes, and vice versa. As these were the only known consistent aberrant occurrences in western Europe, further studies were recommended by scientists working for the local authority, though between 1973 and 1988, at least, no such studies were performed. The aberrant ants, not isolated individuals, but occurring in some numbers, were found near a pool, and were studied for signs of radioactivity, but the cause of the issues was not determined.

== History ==
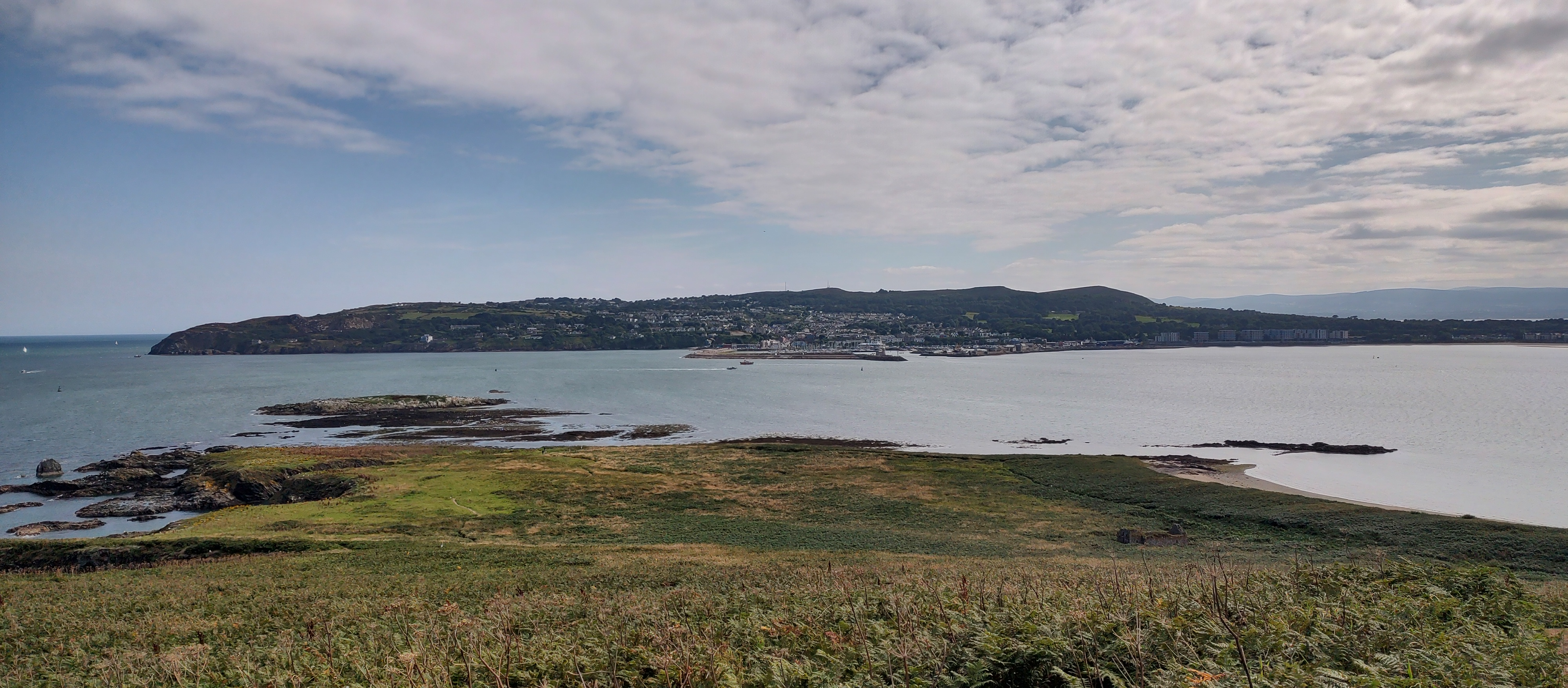
Howth Head as viewed from Ireland' Eye, near the summit

The island has been populated for only a limited span over the last 1400 years, primarily by religious figures over a few centuries. Some signs of farming have been found and ploughing revealed Roman coinage, but there is no record of there ever having been a residential farm there. In the 19th century, a small number of horses were noted as present. Some scholars believe that a monastic settlement might have developed around the church, and farmed both the island and parts of Howth.

=== Early history ===
==== The sons of Nessan ====
A church, Cill-mac-Nessan, was reputedly founded by three of the seven sons of Nessan; all seven sons were ordained (some accounts say that all seven were saints). Nessan in turn was a scion of an Irish regional royal house which ruled Leinster at that time. The three, Munissa, Neslug and Dichuill, "men of exceptional piety, love and peace", arrived at a point between 570 A.D. and the late 7th or early 8th century, with the probable timing partly depending on the estimation of their descent. For example, one scholar, Shearman, reckoned that Nessan was the great-grandson of Colman, King of Leinster until 576, placing Nessan's sons in the late 7th century, while another, Walsh, believed that he had identified Dichiull as a disciple of Maidoc or Madoc of Ferns, who died in 624. At one time, the island was named for these sons of Nessan, as Inis-mac-Nessan, and in Latin this naming appears in a Papal bull of 1179, as Insula Filiorum Nessani. The church once had a round tower on top, one of only nine such churches known. The church was at least partly rebuilt by the 12th century. In some accounts, it is said to have been founded by a "St Nessan" but later scholars showed that this was based on misinterpretation, and confusion of two men with this name, St Nessan being a figure from another part of Ireland with no connection to Ireland's Eye.

==== The Garland of Howth ====
The church had one or more scribes, and they reputedly produced a manuscript book of the four gospels, the Garland of Howth, sometime between the 8th and 10th century, a book later stored in the church. The manuscript is now held in the library of Trinity College Dublin, and has illuminated pages for the beginnings of two of the gospels. Shearman, in Historical Collections (1860) reported a local legend about the book, that it had been thrown at a devil by one of the sons of Nessan, splitting the rock of Howth Head to form Puck Rock, and that it was found centuries later by a local fisherman and presented to Peggy (Margaret) Plunkett, wife of the then Lord of Howth.

==== Raids and loss of status ====
The island was attacked by raiders from the Welsh or English coast in either 701 or 702, and a king of Bregia was killed; attacks, by Vikings, continued in the 9th and 10th centuries, with episodes recorded in 897 and 960, for example. The church became inactive in the 13th century, and its status as a prebend of St Patrick's Cathedral was revoked, being granted instead by the archbishop to St Mary's Abbey in Howth in 1235, with the Garland of Howth transferred as a result.

Ireland's Eye was a possession of the Bishop of Dublin, and later the archdiocese, as confirmed by Pope Alexander III to Saint Laurence O'Toole. It eventually became an element of the Howth estate, held by the St Lawrence family since the invasion of Ireland.

=== 19th century ===
After centuries when the island was little mentioned, a Martello tower was built in 1803 or 1804 as part of the programme of construction of defensive towers around the Irish, and parts of the British, coasts, to defend against the threat of Napoleonic invasion. The tower, the largest in the north Dublin area, was a two-gun establishment, with 24-pound cannon. An ordnance survey obelisk with a trigonometric point was erected on the island's highest point. In the early 19th century the church was visited by several antiquaries, and sketched by, for example, George Petrie in 1828. Mid-century, restoration works were carried out on the church ruins, during which several windows disappeared; these works were afterwards heavily criticised by antiquarians as having destroyed the historic fabric of the building, one saying it was reduced to a "mass of masonry". In 1833 the island was occupied at least some of the time by a single water guard, and had a considerable population of foxes; it had been rented by a local for potential farming but abandoned as it was too difficult to cultivate. As of 1834 the island was described as holding considerable pasturage, and in 1846 the island held a large population of rabbits, and medicinal plants grew there.

==== Death of Sarah Maria Kirwan ====
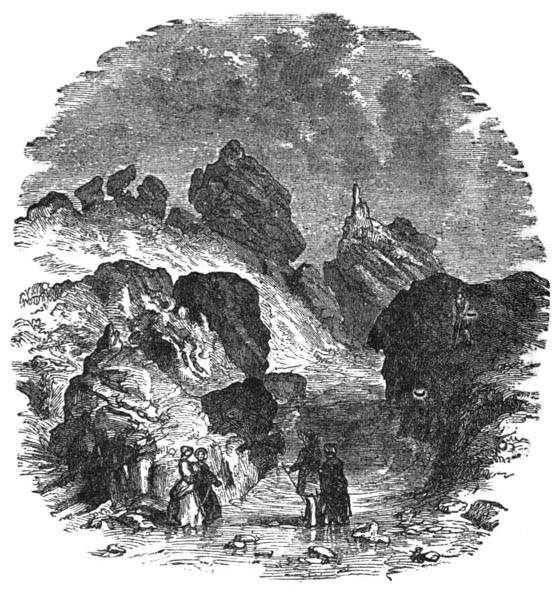
Long Hole, where Sarah Kirwan's body was found

In September 1852, Sarah Maria Louisa Kirwan, and her husband, miniature artist William Burke Kirwan, were on a trip to the island, and Sarah Kirwan disappeared. She died on the island, her drowned body being found in the Long Hole. There was no initial suspicion of foul play but questions were raised after some weeks, and her body was exhumed, and witnesses found who claimed to have heard screaming. After a trial in which he was defended by Isaac Butt, her husband was convicted of her murder. Matthias McDonnell Bodkin claimed in Famous Irish Trials that no murder had taken place, and that Sarah Kirwan had instead drowned accidentally as a result of a fit.

=== 20th and 21st centuries ===
A major wildfire occurred in the summer of 1975, burning for two days and causing serious damage to the island's ecosystem, with about 80% of the surface affected. An ecological team from Ireland's national heritage trust, An Taisce, studied the island afterwards and recommended rectification actions. For a period in the late 20th century, lasting into the 1990s, the island was leased to and managed by An Taisce. In June 2015, a large portion of the island was scorched by gorse fires; unlike the 1975 fire, these were curtailed by water drops by local authorities. An archaeological study in the 21st century identified further potential promontory fort presence.

In October 2018, the Gaisford-St.Lawrence family, heirs to the Lords of Howth, agreed to sell Howth Castle and demesne, including Ireland's Eye, to the Tetrarch investment group, as part of a multi-million euro deal, and on the 28 May 2019, for the first time in centuries, the freehold of the island passed outside the family. Tetrarch confirmed that the island would remain open to visitors, and stated their commitment to maintaining its beauty and accessibility.

== Buildings ==
The ruins of an 8th-century church (the Church of the Three Sons of Nessan) and a Martello tower are the only signs of previous habitation.

=== Cill Mac Nessan ===
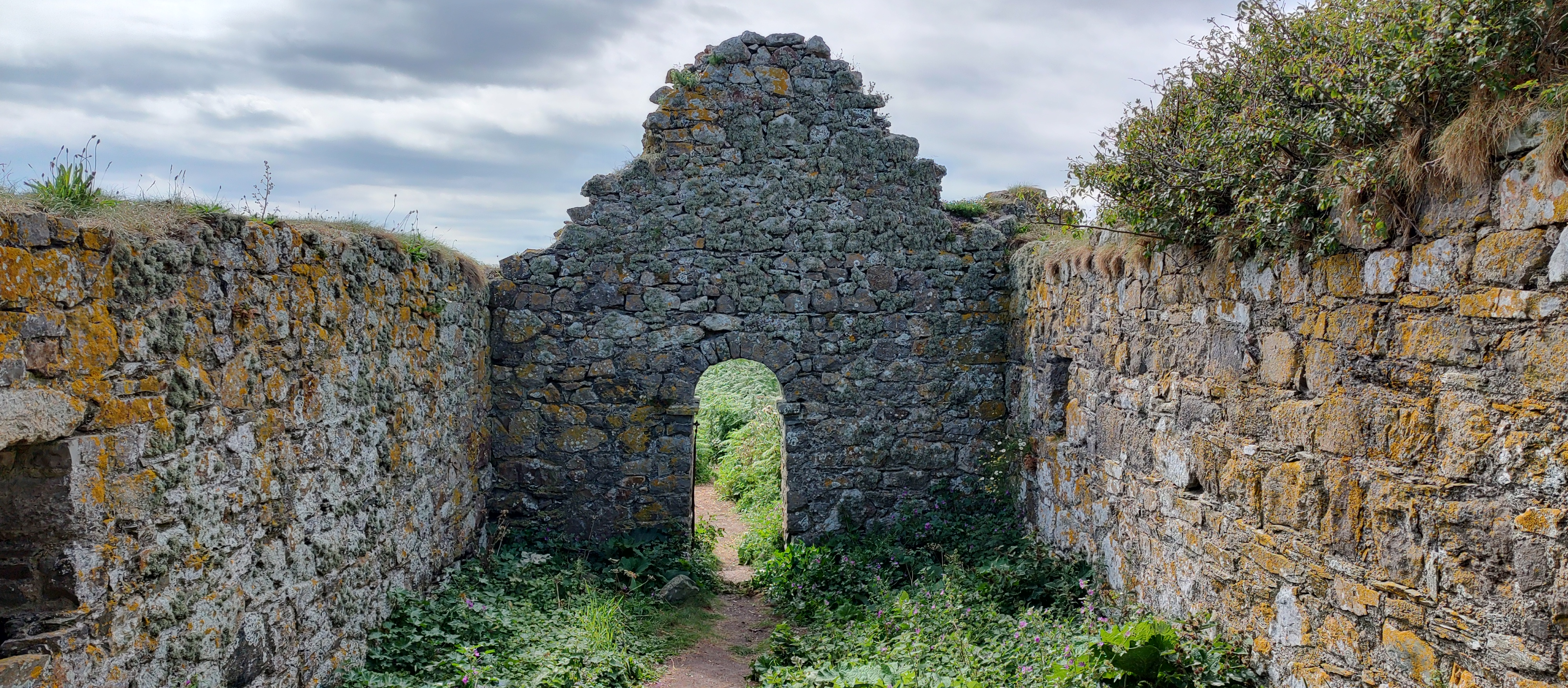
Cill Mac Nessan, inside the ruins

In 1837 the remains of the church of the sons of Nessan were prominent on the south west side of the island. The church is often, though inaccurately, known as St Nessan's Church. It functioned as parish church for Howth until 1235, being replaced by the church of St Mary's Abbey, and later a church in the village, perhaps partly due to the limitations of having to take a boat for every service. A burial ground exists beside the church. No evidence of a broader settlement, such as a full monastery, has been found to date but scholars have noted that were secondary buildings made of wattle-and-daub, for example, traces might not have survived.

The ruins of a church which probably began as a simple single-chamber chapel but which later took on a nave-and-chancel form, were subject to attempted restoration in the 19th century. When studied by Robert Cochrane, they were measured at around 28 ft (8.5 m) by 14 ft (4.3 m)–15 ft (4.6 m), with walls nearly 3 ft (0.91 m) in thickness. The round tower on the roof had a circumference of 42 ft (13 m), and Petrie computed its likely full height at 60 ft (18 m). Stones were removed, notably from the doorway area of the church, before 1845, to be used in the building of a new parish church in Howth village.

=== Martello tower ===
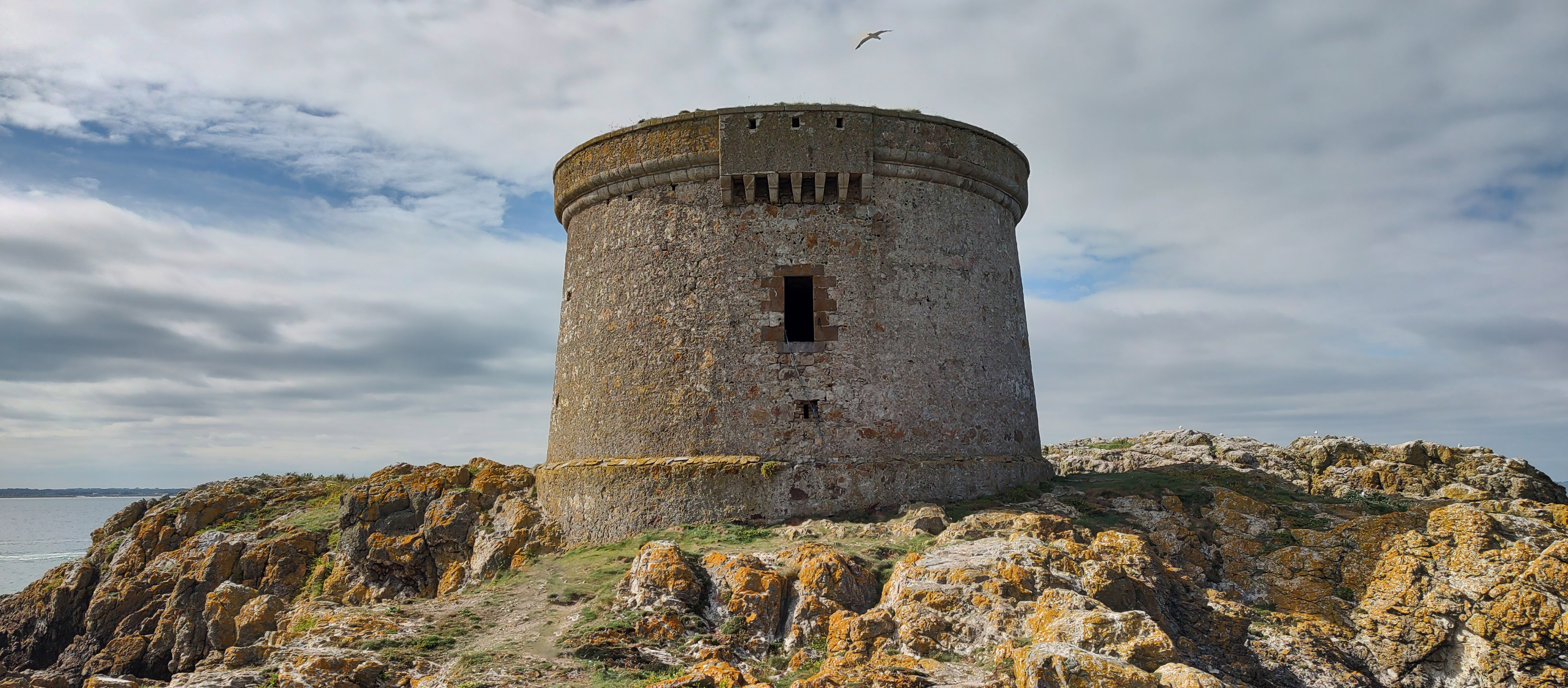
The Martello Tower on Ireland's Eye

The Martello tower, built in 1803 or 1804, was one of three constructed in the Howth area, and 26 in northern County Dublin, on the instructions of Prince Frederick, Duke of York and Albany to repel a possible invasion by Napoleon. Hosting two 24-pound guns, it was one of the larger Martello towers. It was constructed on a rocky area in the northwestern corner of the island, allowing it to limit access to Howth Harbour, and to observe and partly control usage of the anchorage area northwest of the Eye. The tower is built of rubble coated with rendering, with some brickwork, at least in the domed roof area, and a few pieces of cut limestone. It features both a plinth and a machicolation, a single entrance on its southern face, and three other small openings. The interior was, and largely remains, lime-washed. There was a wooden floor at the first-floor level, to which the raised door gave access; this has subsequently been removed. The undercroft is divided in three by rubble walls, and there is an iron storage chest there. The tower originally occupied a designated section of the island, with boundary-marking stones, and was sited near the island's spring.

The tower was rarely occupied, which contributed to poor maintenance, but there was a period during which it was a base, perhaps seasonal, for an early modern customs patrol body, the Preventative Water Guard. The Board of Ordnance having failed to rent out the tower, it was sold to the Lords of Howth in 1909, and passed to the Gaisford-St Lawrence family soon after, when the direct family line ended. It is believed to be structurally sound but is not actively maintained or in any official use. Its entrance, 5 metres above ground level, can be accessed by a rope that hangs down from the window.

== Jurisdiction, status and management ==
Ireland's Eye lies within the traditional County Dublin, and is now in the jurisdiction of Fingal County Council. It was previously governed by Dublin County Council, having been moved from the jurisdiction of the city of Dublin as part of a transfer encompassing Howth, Sutton, Baldoyle and Kilbarrack, and, explicitly, Ireland's Eye, and having in turn previously moved from the county administration. It is a townland in its own right, with a registered area of 21.5 hectares (53 acres), in turn within the civil parish of Howth, and the barony of Coolock.

=== Statuses and designations ===
The island, its rocks and the islet of Thulla, and the surrounding waters, form both a Special Area of Conservation (SAC), based on two qualifying interests (perennial vegetation of stony banks and vegetated sea cliffs of the Atlantic and Baltic coasts), and a Special Protection Area (SPA). They are also within the large Rockabill to Dalkey Island SAC. The island is a proposed Natural Heritage Area (pNHA) and is also a County Geological Site under the Fingal development plan (2017-2023). It is also within the Dublin Bay Sea Character Area, SCA15.

Ireland's Eye and its surrounding rocks and sea are incorporated within the Howth Special Amenity Area, which places some limitations on permitted development, and is overseen by a management committee with local authority and community representatives. Ireland's Eye is also within the Dublin Bay Biosphere Reserve.

The ruined Church of the Sons of Nessan and the Martello tower are designated National Monuments, as is the burial site near the church, and the possible site of a promontory fort, not fully studied as of 2018.

=== Management and plans ===
A management document was prepared in 2017 by consultants working for Fingal County Council, with input from a wide range of stakeholders, and a public meeting in Howth village. It comprised a study, summarising many sources about the island, and a prescriptive plan for 2018–2022, agreed between the owner, the local authority and some other stakeholders, including Conservation Volunteers Ireland. One group of planned actions related to management and control of visiting. This included agreement to make a one-off improvement to one of the landing places, to the east of the Martello tower, with installation of tying-up facilities, boats having been previously simply held manually near shore to allow disembarkation and embarkation. It was also agreed to pursue at least semi-annual clearance of paths, using mowing and strimming. There would also be a continuation of the ban on camping without a permit, a permanent ban on barbeques and fires, and installation of limited but robust signage. It was also agreed to create a form of steering group, "Friend's of Ireland's Eye", for the island. Plans relating to the natural environment included triennial monitoring of vegetation, with some sampling quadrats maintained permanently, and annual removal or spraying of invasive plant species, as well as restoration of the spring and pond. There would be more structured rat control, and greater protection of nesting sites, and monitoring of birds. It was also proposed to provide informational signage at Howth Harbour, make an information leaflet available for passengers on island ferries, and promote the island in schools. On the heritage aspect of the island, it was agreed to block access to the interior of the tower with a locked door or grille, and otherwise maintain it. In the medium term it was planned to seek ways to conduct archaeological research, near the buildings and on potential promontory fort locations.

== Access and leisure ==
=== Tourist and private boats ===
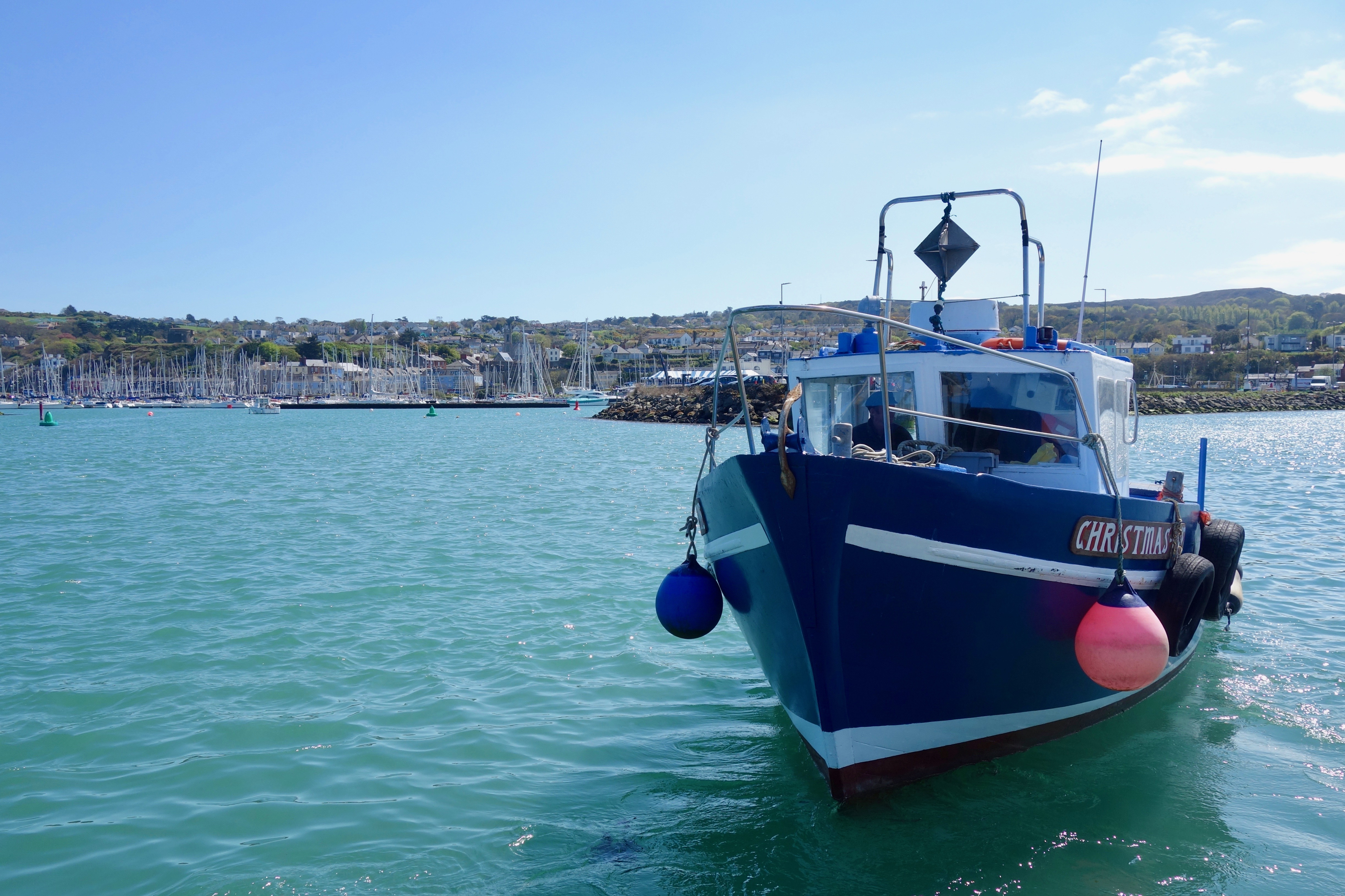
Ferry to the island

Ireland's Eye has been served by various tourist boat companies over decades, at least, all running from Howth Harbour. As of 2020, access to the island has never been restricted and there is no admission charge. Both tours around the island and landings on it are offered, subject to weather conditions, though the island has no running water or sanitary facilities. One company, Ireland's Eye Ferries, dates from 1947; another is Island Ferries. Services generally run in the summer months, and in the daytime, though evening services have also been offered. The two companies named held exclusive licences from the Howth Estate for landing of passengers, as of 2018, and operated four boats between them. The island is also used as a landing place for kayakers and other leisure boaters.

There are no piers or other substantial landing aids, but there are two established landing points at the northwest of the island, either side of the Martello tower, the one to the east featuring basic steps. Carrigeen Bay is the only other safe landing location on the island, and only if the weather is not unsettled. Guidance on landing is published, and there is one anchorage designated, northwest of the island, southeast of the submarine cable from Baldoyle to Southport (there are two other submarine cables, no longer in use, south of the island). Aids to navigation include two buoys on the Rowan Rocks on the eastern side of Ireland's Eye, as well as the Howth buoy and the modern Howth light tower, which replaced the now-disused Howth Lighthouse. Waters to the north and east are 8 metres or more in depth 0.1 kilometres out from the island, while in Howth Sound reach only a little over 2.5 metres even a couple of hundred metres out.

=== Walking ===
There are a number of informal pathways, none surfaced, and a circular path, designed to help walkers avoid nesting birds, was added in 2017.

=== Rock-climbing ===
The island has long been established as a minor rock-climbing location. At least 28 routes have been recorded since the 1940s, though it seems that climbers have operated on the island since the 1910s or before, with some routes – a ridge and the "inner stack", facing the Steer – believed to have been plotted by Conor O'Brien and other members of the Arts Club. Periods of greater activity were noted in 1942–1944, with the "old" Irish Mountaineering Club (IMC), from 1948, with the "new" IMC, and from 1978. The most prolific routes were developed on the Steer (the "outer stack"), the "inner stack" facing it, and an isolated pinnacle SW of the Steer, as well as the principal cliff area. Some routes are no longer accessible due to shifts in the rock formations, guano build-up and bird population growth, notably on the Steer. Climbing during the seabird nesting season of April to July is discouraged.
