= Archetypal literary criticism =

Literary Criticism theory

Archetypal literary criticism is a type of analytical theory that interprets a text by focusing on recurring myths and archetypes (from the Greek archē, "beginning", and typos, "imprint") in the narrative, symbols, images, and character types in literary works. As an acknowledged form of literary criticism, it dates back to 1934 when Classical scholar Maud Bodkin published Archetypal Patterns in Poetry.

Archetypal literary criticism's origins are rooted in two other academic disciplines, social anthropology and psychoanalysis; each contributed to literary criticism in separate ways. Archetypal criticism peaked in popularity in the 1940s and 1950s, largely due to the work of Canadian literary critic Northrop Frye (1912–1991). In the twenty-first century, archetypal literary criticism is no longer widely practiced; there have not been any major recent developments in the field (with the possible exception of biblical literary criticism), but it still has a place in the tradition of literary studies.

== Origins ==
=== Frazer ===
The anthropological origin of archetypal criticism can pre-date its analytical psychology origins by over 30 years. The Golden Bough (1890–1915), written by the Scottish anthropologist Sir James George Frazer, was the first influential text dealing with cultural mythologies. Frazer was part of a group of comparative anthropologists working out of Cambridge University who worked extensively on the topic. The Golden Bough was widely accepted as the seminal text on myth that spawned numerous studies on the same subject. Eventually, the momentum of Frazer's work carried over into literary studies.

In The Golden Bough Frazer identifies practices and mythological beliefs shared among primitive religions and modern religions. Frazer argues that the death-rebirth myth is present in almost all cultural mythologies, and is acted out in terms of growing seasons and vegetation. The myth is symbolized by the death (i.e., final harvest) and rebirth (i.e., spring) of the god of vegetation.

As an example, Frazer cites the Greek myth of Persephone, who was taken to the Underworld by Hades. Her mother Demeter, the goddess of the harvest, was so sad that she struck the world with fall and winter. While in the underworld Persephone ate six of the twelve pomegranate seeds given to her by Hades; consequently, she was forced to spend half the year, from then on, in the Underworld, representative of autumn and winter, or the death in the death-rebirth myth. The other half of the year Persephone was permitted to be with Demeter in the mortal realm, which represents spring and summer, or the rebirth in the death-rebirth myth.

=== Jung ===
While Frazer's work deals with mythology and archetypes in material terms, the work of Carl Gustav Jung, the Swiss-born founder of analytical psychology, is, in contrast, immaterial in its focus. Jung's work theorizes about myths and archetypes in relation to the unconscious, an inaccessible part of the mind. From a Jungian perspective, myths are the "culturally elaborated representations of the contents of the deepest recess of the human psyche: the world of the archetypes" (Walker 4).

Jungian analytical psychology distinguishes between the personal and collective unconscious, the latter being particularly relevant to archetypal criticism. The collective unconscious, or the objective psyche as it is less frequently known, is a number of innate thoughts, feelings, instincts, and memories that reside in the unconsciousness of all people. Jung's definition of the term is inconsistent in his many writings. At one time he calls the collective unconscious the "a priori, inborn forms of intuition" (Lietch 998), while in another instance it is a series of "experience(s) that come upon us like fate" (998). Regardless of the many nuances between Jung's definitions, the collective unconsciousness is a shared part of the unconscious.

To Jung, an archetype in the collective unconscious, as quoted from Leitch et al., is "irrepresentable, but has effects which make visualizations of it possible, namely, the archetypal images and ideas" (988), due to the fact they are at an inaccessible part of the mind. The archetypes to which Jung refers are represented through primordial images, a term he coined. Primordial images originate from the initial stages of humanity and have been part of the collective unconscious ever since. It is through primordial images that universal archetypes are experienced, and more importantly, that the unconscious is revealed.

With the same death-rebirth myth that Frazer sees as being representative of the growing seasons and agriculture as a point of comparison, a Jungian analysis envisions the death-rebirth archetype as a "symbolic expression of a process taking place not in the world but in the mind. That process is the return of the ego to the unconscious—a kind of temporary death of the ego—and its re-emergence, or rebirth, from the unconscious" (Segal 4).

By itself, Jung's theory of the collective unconscious accounts for a considerable share of writings in archetypal literary criticism; it also pre-dates the height of archetypal literary criticism by over a decade. The Jungian archetypal approach treats literary texts as an avenue in which primordial images are represented. It would not be until the 1950s when the other branch of archetypal literary criticism developed.

=== Frye ===
Bodkin's Archetypal Patterns in Poetry, the first work on the subject of archetypal literary criticism, applies Jung's theories about the collective unconscious, archetypes, and primordial images to literature. It was not until the work of the Canadian literary critic Northrop Frye that archetypal criticism was theorized in purely literary terms. The major work of Frye's to deal with archetypes is Anatomy of Criticism but his essay "The Archetypes of Literature" is a precursor to the book. Frye's thesis in "The Archetypes of Literature" remains largely unchanged in Anatomy of Criticism. Frye's work helped displace New Criticism as the major mode of analyzing literary texts, before giving way to structuralism and semiotics.

Frye's work breaks from both Frazer and Jung in such a way that it is distinct from its anthropological and psychoanalytical precursors. For Frye, the death-rebirth myth, that Frazer sees manifest in agriculture and the harvest, is not ritualistic since it is involuntary, and therefore, must be done. As for Jung, Frye was uninterested about the collective unconscious on the grounds of feeling it was unnecessary: since the unconscious is unknowable it cannot be studied. How archetypes came to be also of no concern to Frye; rather, the function and effect of archetypes is his interest. For Frye, literary archetypes "play an essential role in refashioning the material universe into an alternative verbal universe that is humanly intelligible and viable, because it is adapted to essential human needs and concerns" (Abrams 224–225).

There are two basic categories in Frye's framework, comedic and tragic. Each category is further subdivided into two categories: comedy and romance for the comedic; tragedy and satire (or ironic) for the tragic. Though he is dismissive of Frazer, Frye uses the seasons in his archetypal schema. Each season is aligned with a literary genre: comedy with spring, romance with summer, tragedy with autumn, and satire with winter.

Comedy is aligned with spring because the genre of comedy is characterized by the rebirth of the hero, revival and resurrection. Also, spring symbolizes the defeat of winter and darkness. Romance and summer are paired together because summer is the culmination of life in the seasonal calendar, and the romance genre culminates with some sort of triumph, usually a marriage. Autumn is the dying stage of the seasonal calendar, which parallels the tragedy genre because it is, above all, known for the "fall" or demise of the protagonist.

Satire is metonymized with winter on the grounds that satire is a "dark" genre; satire is a disillusioned and mocking form of the three other genres. It is noted for its darkness, dissolution, the return of chaos, and the defeat of the heroic figure. The seasons are associated with narrative parallels:

- Summer – romance. The birth of the hero.
- Autumn – tragedy. Movement towards the death or defeat of the hero.
- Winter – irony or satire. The hero is absent.
- Spring – comedy. The rebirth of the hero.

The context of a genre determines how a symbol or image is to be interpreted. Frye outlines five different spheres in his schema: human, animal, vegetation, mineral, and water. The comedic human world is representative of wish-fulfillment and being community centred. In contrast, the tragic human world is of isolation, tyranny, and the fallen hero. Animals in the comedic genres are docile and pastoral (e.g. sheep), while animals are predatory and hunters in the tragic (e.g. wolves).

For the realm of vegetation, the comedic is, again, pastoral but also represented by gardens, parks, roses and lotuses. As for the tragic, vegetation is of a wild forest, or as being barren. Cities, a temple, or precious stones represent the comedic mineral realm.

The tragic mineral realm is noted for being a desert, ruins, or "of sinister geometrical images" (Frye 1456). Lastly, the water realm is represented by rivers in the comedic. With the tragic, the seas, and especially floods, signify the water sphere.

Frye admits that his schema in "The Archetypes of Literature" is simplistic, but makes room for exceptions by noting that there are neutral archetypes. The examples he cites are islands such as Circe's or Prospero's which cannot be categorized under the tragic or comedic.

== Other contributors ==
Maud Bodkin wrote Archetypal Patterns in Poetry in 1934, applying the ideas of Jung to poetry, and examining archetypes such as the ancient mariner and rebirth, heaven and hell, images of the devil, the hero and God.

In his 1949 book Hero with a Thousand Faces, Joseph Campbell pioneered the idea of the ‘monomyth' (though the term was borrowed from James Joyce), a universal pattern in heroic tales across different cultures and genres. His deep examination of the eight step hero's journey (and the common variations that exist) had a huge impact on the Abstract Expressionists of the 1950s, and continues to inspire creative artists today.

== Criticisms ==
It has been argued that Frye's version of archetypal criticism strictly categorizes works based on their genres, which determines how an archetype is to be interpreted in a text. According to this argument the dilemma Frye's archetypal criticism faces with more contemporary literature, and that of post-modernism in general, is that genres and categories are no longer distinctly separate and that the very concept of genres has become blurred, thus problematizing Frye's schema.

For instance Beckett's Waiting For Godot is considered a tragicomedy, a play with elements of tragedy and satire, with the implication that interpreting textual elements in the play becomes difficult as the two opposing seasons and conventions that Frye associated with genres are pitted against each other. But in fact arguments about generic blends such as tragicomedy go back to the Renaissance, and Frye always conceived of genres as fluid. Frye thought literary forms were part of a great circle and were capable of shading into other generic forms. (He contemplated including a diagram of his wheel in Anatomy of Criticism but thought better of it.) Myth and archetype deals with origin of literary.

== Examples in literature ==
- Femme fatale: A female character type who brings upon catastrophic and disastrous events. Eve from the story of Genesis or Pandora from Greek mythology are two such figures.
- The Journey: A narrative archetype where the protagonist must overcome a series of obstacles before reaching his or her goal. The quintessential journey archetype in Western culture is arguably Homer's Odyssey.

Archetypal symbols vary more than archetype narratives or character types. The best archetypal pattern is any symbol with deep roots in a culture's mythology, such as the forbidden fruit in Genesis or even the poison apple in Snow White. These are examples of symbols that resonate with archetypal critics.

Archetypes are said, by archetypal critics, to reveal shared roles among universal societies. This archetype may create a shared imaginary which is defined by many stereotypes that have not separated themselves from the traditional, biological, religious and mythical framework.

== See also ==
- Comparative mythology
- Jungian archetypes
- Monomyth
- The Hero with a Thousand Faces
- Trope (literature)
- Typology (theology)

== Bibliography ==
- Abrams, M. H. "Archetypal Criticism." A Glossary of Literary Terms. Fort Worth: HBJ, 1993. 223 - 225
- Bates, Roland. Northrop Frye. Toronto: McClelland and Stewart, 1971.
- Frye, Northrop. "The Archetypes of Literature." The Norton Anthology: Theory and Criticism. Ed. Vincent B. Leitch. New York: Norton, 2001. 1445 - 1457
- Knapp, Bettina L. "Introduction." A Jungian Approach to Literature. Carbondale and Edwardsville: Southern Illinois University Press, 1984. ix - xvi
- Leitch, Vincent B. "Northrop Frye." The Norton Anthology: Theory and Criticism. Ed. Vincent B. Leitch. New York: Norton, 2001. 1442 - 1445
- -- "Carl Gustav Jung." The Norton Anthology: Theory and Criticism. Ed. Vincent B. Leitch. New York: Norton, 2001. 987 - 990
- Segal, Robert A. "Introduction." Jung on Mythology. Princeton: Princeton University Press, 1998. 3 - 48
- Sugg, Richard P., ed. Jungian Literary Criticism. Evanston, Ill.: Northwestern University Press, 1992. (439 pgs.)
- Walker, Steven F. Jung and the Jungians on Myth. New York: Garland Publishing, 1995. 3 - 15
