= William Burke Kirwan =

Irish painter (1814–1880)

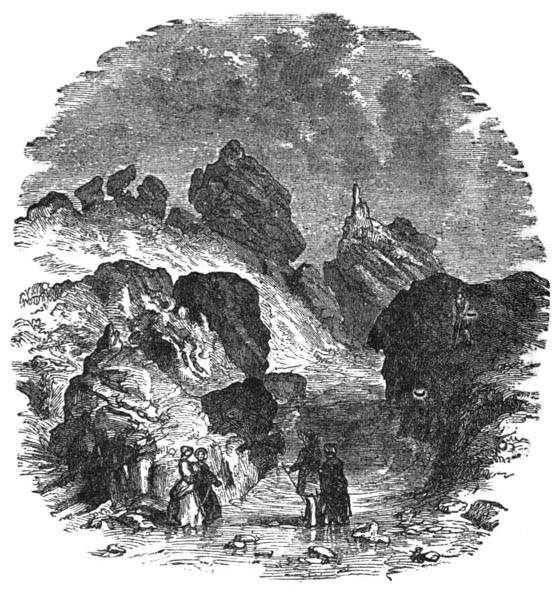
Long Hole where Sarah Kirwan's body was found

William Burke Kirwan (c. 1814–1880?) was a minor Irish painter best known for the murder of his wife, Sarah Maria Louisa Kirwan. The resulting trial was one of the most notorious in Victorian Ireland.

== Early life ==
William Bourke Kirwan was born in Dublin in 1814 into an artistic family. He studied art under the portrait painter Richard Downes Bowyer, and exhibited various pieces of art at the Royal Hibernian Academy in the 1830s and 1840s. He later worked as an engraver, picture cleaner, and anatomical draughtsman.

He married Sarah Maria Louisa Crowe (1824-1852), and they resided together on Merrion Street in Dublin. They had no children.

== Murder and aftermath ==
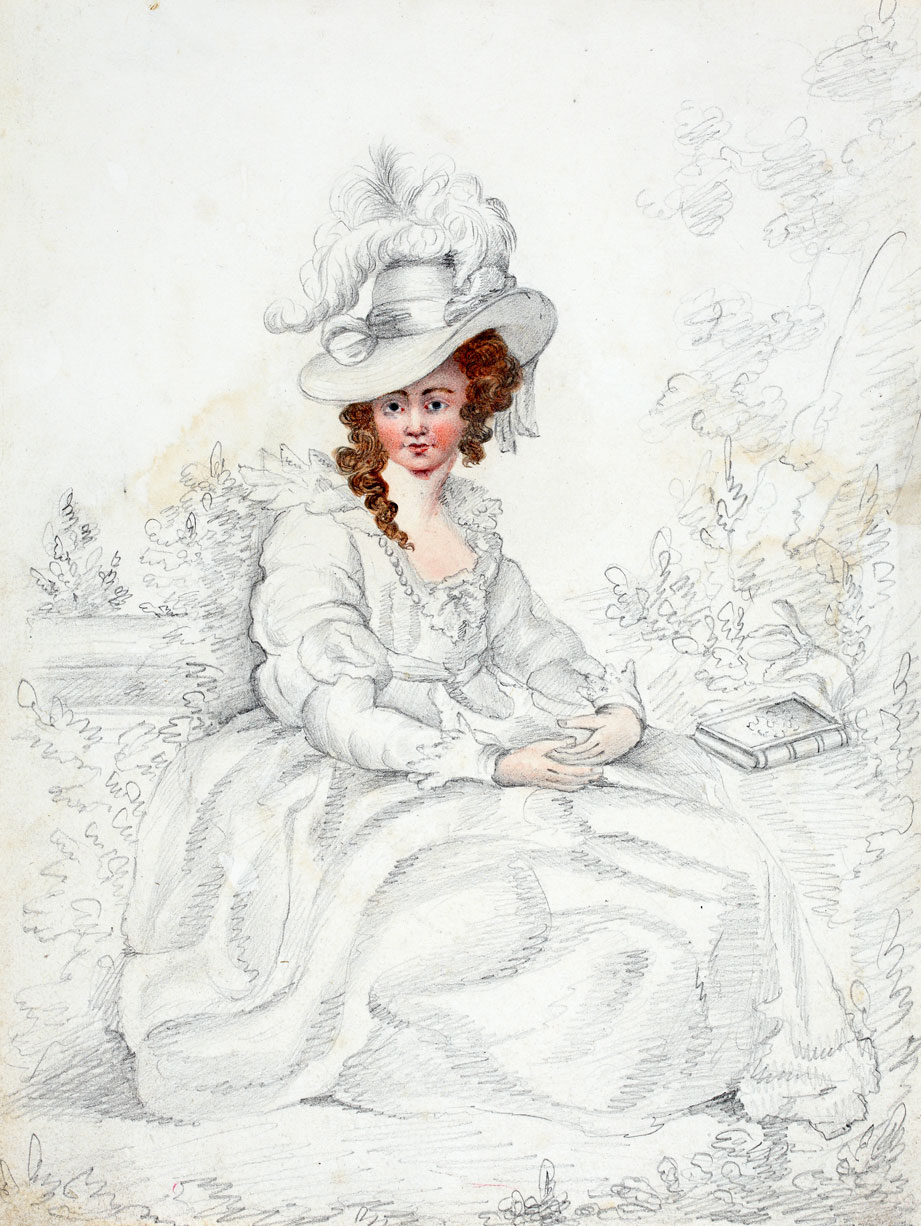
Portrait of Sarah Maria Louisa Kirwan, ca. 1845

The couple went on an outing to the small island of Ireland's Eye, off the coast of Dublin, on September 6, 1852. Kirwan claimed not to be able to find his wife after she had swum while he sketched. Her body was later found on a rock on the island, covered in blood.

While at first it was believed that she had died in an accidental drowning, a later exhumation and autopsy showed signs of manual asphyxiation. Kirwan's subsequent arrest and trial caused a media sensation across Ireland, and the United Kingdom. The trial, which took place in Dublin's Green Street Courthouse in December 1852, attracted large crowds. Kirwan’s defence was headed by the noted barrister and MP Isaac Butt. Kirwan had long maintained a separate home in Sandymount with his mistress, Maria Teresa Kenny and their eight children, which was presented as a motive for him to murder his wife.

Kirwan was found guilty and sentenced to death, but this was commuted to life imprisonment and transportation after appeals by reputable citizens, including ten doctors who stated that his wife's death was consistent with drowning.

He was sent to the convict establishment labouring in the construction of the Royal Naval Dockyard on the island of Ireland in the Imperial fortress colony of Bermuda, where many other Irish convicts, including nationalist journalist and politician John Mitchel, had been sent before him (convicts were accommodated on prison hulks at Ireland Island until the construction of barracks for them on the adjacent Boaz Island in the 1840s). Ferdinand Whittingham, an army officer serving in the Bermuda Garrison, recorded Kirwan's presence in Bermuda in Chapter XII of his 1857 book BERMUDA; A COLONY, A FORTRESS AND A PRISON; OR, Eighteen Months in the Somers Islands:

Amongst the prisoners at Boaz Island is the painter Kirwan, who was sentenced to be hanged some years ago for the murder of his wife at Ireland Eye, near Dublin. He was saved from the gibbet, chiefly by the exertions of the fourth estate. But he maintains that he had no justice dealt to him : for that, if guilty, he ought to have been hanged, and if innocent, he should have been set at liberty. He has, at all events, been treated with great leniency; having never undergone much hard labour. A convenient sore leg has been of great service to him. He has only been employed in light duties. For some time he was clerk in the hospital hulk at Boaz. As he had the good fortune to arrive during the old system, he will doubtless, in a few years, return to the bosom of that second wife, whom he married so soon after the death of the first.

Kirwan was freed in 1879, and may have emigrated to the United States. The site of Sarah Maria Louisa Kirwan's murder became a popular site for tourism in the mid-nineteenth century.

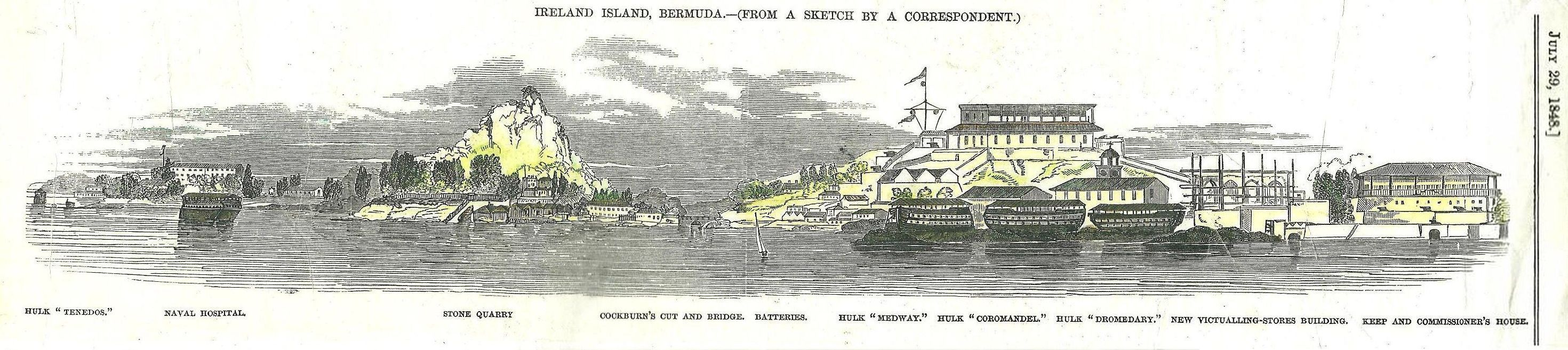
1848 Woodcut of HMD Bermuda, Ireland Island, Bermuda, British North America.
