= John Bodkin =

John Bodkin may refer to:

- John Bodkin (Warden of Galway) (died 1710)
- John Bodkin (c. 1720 – 1742), hanged, drawn and quartered for the murder of his brother
- John James Bodkin (1801–1882), Irish Whig politician

== See also ==
- John Bodkin Adams (1899–1983), Irish general practitioner, convicted fraudster and suspected serial killer
- John Bodkin fitz Richard, Mayor of Galway, 1518–19
- John Bodkin fitz Dominick, Mayor of Galway, 1638–40
