= Odds bodkins (disambiguation) =

Odds bodkins and variants may refer to:

- Odds bodkins, an antique minced oath
- Odds Bodkin (born 1953), American storyteller
- Odd Bodkins, comic strip (1964–1970) by Dan O'Neill
  - The Collective Unconscience of Odd Bodkins, 1973 compilation book
- Odd Bodkins, comic strip (1941–1942) by Chase Craig
