= Tom Bodkin =

American newspaper editor

- Born: 1953 (age 71–72); New York City, US
- Occupations: Editor; designer
- Employer: The New York Times (1980–2024)

Tom Bodkin (born 1953) is a retired American newspaper editor who worked for many years as design director and chief creative officer of The New York Times.

== Background ==
Bodkin, who was born in New York City and grew up in Great Neck, New York, graduated from John L. Miller Great Neck North High School in 1971, where he was editor-in-chief of the award-winning school newspaper. He attended Brown University, but did not graduate, and moved to New York City after two years. After brief stints with various outlets, including The Village Voice and CBS with Lou Dorfsman, he joined The New York Times in 1980.

== The New York Times ==
Bodkin oversaw design and layout for the newspaper, redesigning the Arts & Leisure section before being named design director in 1985. His staff included the Art Directors, Designers, Production and Layout desks, and he was an important factor designing the appearance of each day's front page, sketching out prospective layouts on paper.

Bodkin helped develop the newspaper's website, brought color photography to the front page in 1997, was the presiding design director during 9-11, and had a large influence on the layout of the front page with the headline "U.S. Attacked". In 2003, he introduced a modified version of Cheltenham as the standard typeface for the paper. He also led the team that created the Times Reader, a digital version of the newspaper created in collaboration with Microsoft.

Later in his career, Bodkin helped design the front page on May 24, 2020, which contained nothing except a headline and brief introduction before six columns of uninterrupted text identifying 1,000 people in the United States who died from COVID-19 during the pandemic. Inspired by the design of old newspapers, it was the only front page from his tenure at the Times which contained no images.

Bodkin retired from the Times in 2024; the last front page he designed was the February 29 edition.

== Personal life ==
As of 2024, Bodkin lives in Stone Ridge, New York.
