= Matthias Bodkin =

Irish Jesuit priest and writer

Matthias Bodkin a.k.a. Matthias McDonnell Bodkin, Jesuit priest and author, 26 June 1896 – 2 November 1973.

Bodkin was a son of Matthias McDonnell Bodkin; he never used his middle name, to differentiate himself from his father.

He was ordained in Dublin in 1931. He served as a Royal Navy chaplain during the Second World War, in Derry and aboard HMS Anson in the Pacific.

He was a prolific writer on religious subjects, but also adventure stories for boys (usually as M. Bodkin). In 1940, he published Halt Invader! – an account of a secret attempt to establish a (foreign) military base in Northern Donegal, which is discovered by two visiting schoolchildren.

His most acclaimed work was a biography of John Sullivan, a fellow Jesuit, published as The Port of Tears in 1954.

In later life, his eyesight began to fail, so he turned to retreat work and counselling. He died in Dublin.

He was a brother of Thomas Bodkin. He was also a descendant of the Tribes of Galway.
