= Amby Bodkin =

Irish lawyer

Amby Bodkin, Irish lawyer and duelist, fl. 1777 - 1795.

== Background ==
Bodkin was a descendant of The Tribes of Galway and a lawyer on the Connacht circuit. His ancestor was Tomás Bobhdacing, (fl. 1300).

He was a member of the committee who met annually at either Galway or Clonmel to look into the code of dueling. Bodkin was one of the signatories of the Irish Code Duello which met at the Clonmel summer assizes in the summer of 1777.

== The Duel ==
At one stage of his career he was counsel for the plaintiff in a case against Sir Ulick Burke of Glinsk, County Galway. Burke and his attorney sent Bodkin and his attorney challenges to a duel.

In this duel, shots were exchanged on horseback. If this proved ineffective they continued firing; if that too was ineffective swords and daggers were used, either mounted or on foot.

The encounter proved bloody, and Bodkin was wounded. However, no fatalities are believed to have occurred.

Large crowds attended, as such events were also a popular spectator sport.
