= Bodkin point =

Type of arrowhead

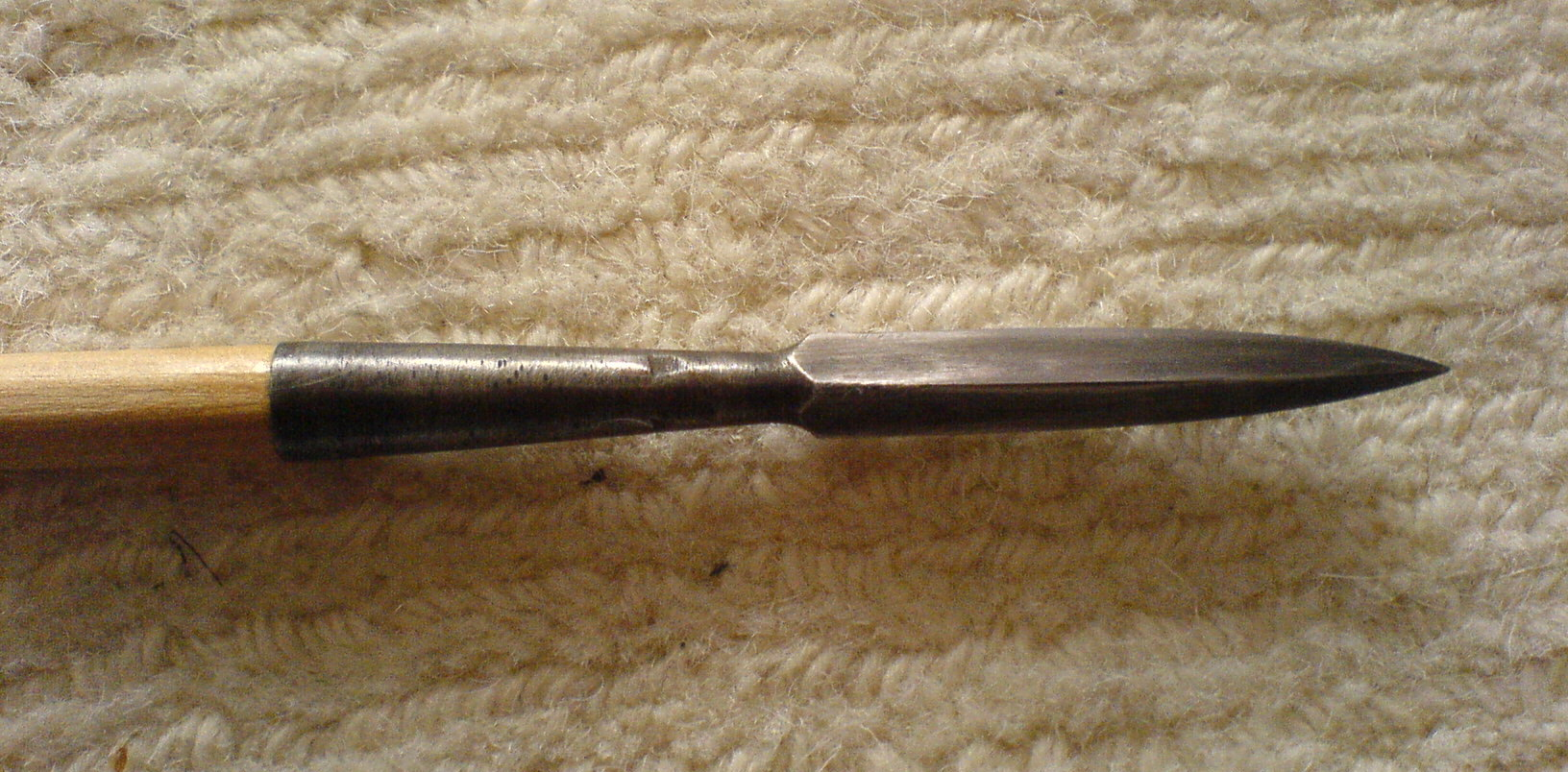
A bodkin point arrowhead

A bodkin point or bodkin tip is a type of needle-arrowhead, designed to pierce armour, which was used extensively throughout the 1st millennium and first half of the 2nd millennium. In its simplest form, it is an uncomplicated squared metal spike, but more advanced forms exist.

The typical bodkin was a square-section arrowhead, generally up to 11.5 cm (4.5 in) long and 1 cm (0.39 in) thick at its widest point, tapered down behind this initial "punch" shape. Bodkin arrows complemented traditional broadhead arrows, as bodkin point arrows were designed to defeat mail armour while broadhead point arrows caused more serious wounds and tissue damage.

== Etymology ==
The term bodkin point/tip derives its name from the word bodkin, a type of sharp, pointed dagger. It stems from Middle English: bodekin or boydekin, and was largely popularized by William Shakespeare in Hamlet.

The root of the word is unknown, but may be of Celtic origin.

== History ==
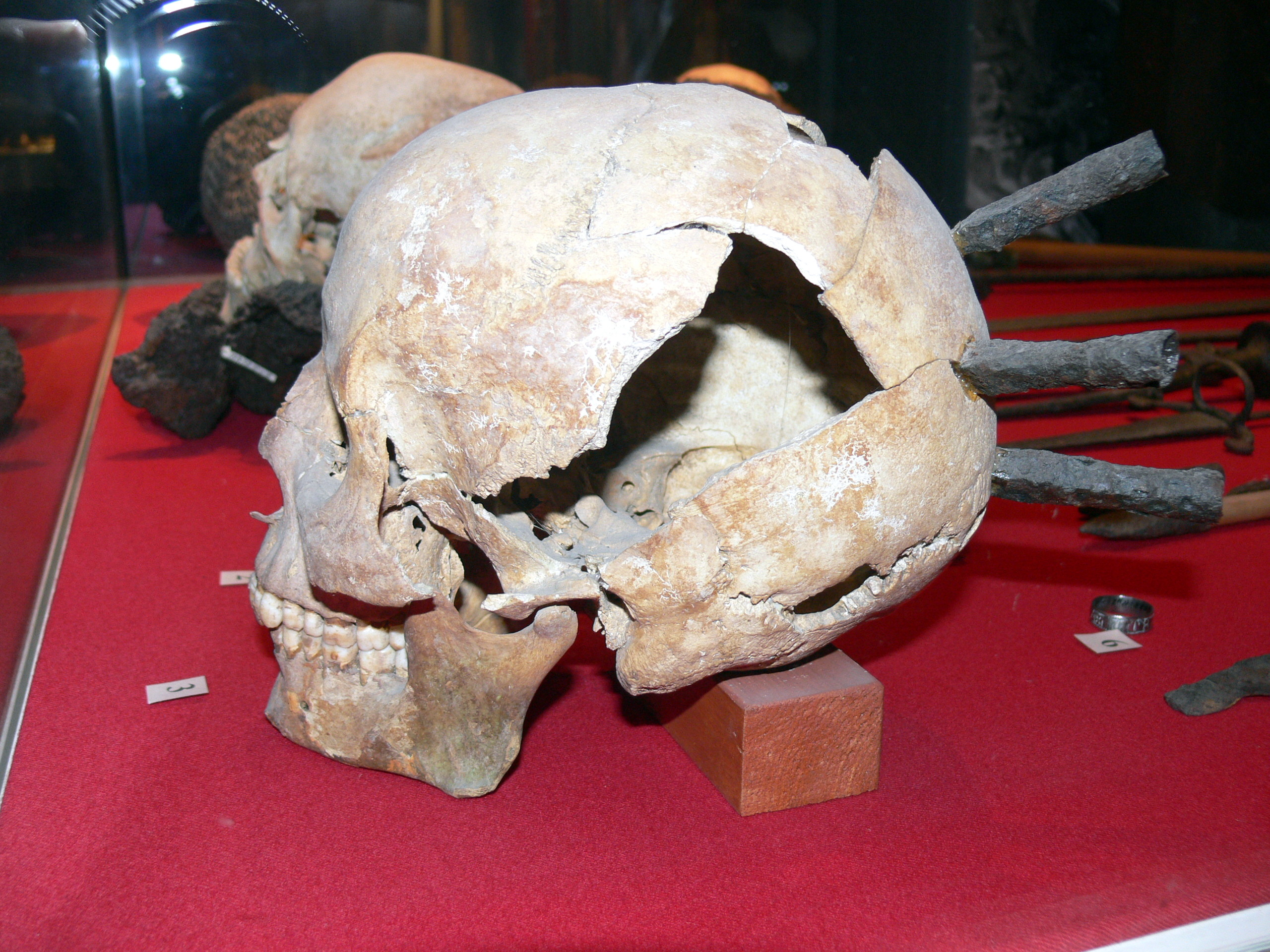
The skull of a participant in the 1361 Danish invasion of Gotland, with three bodkin points embedded.

=== Needle Bodkin ===
Bodkin-type arrowheads have been found in Northern Europe dating to the Late Roman Iron Age (200–400 AD), such as in Nydam Mose in Denmark. Such were used throughout the Viking Age and into the later Middle Ages.

These earlier types of bodkin tips were designed to break open the rings in chain mail, and were thus relatively long and thin, often called Needle Bodkin.

=== Plate Cutter ===
During the Late Middle Ages, plate armour emerged. Against such, Needle Bodkins were ineffective, as the long thin tip easily bent upon impact, especially at higher impact angles. To counter plate armour, shorter, more robust, bodkin tips were developed, later combined with case-hardening. Such are sometimes called plate cutters.

The bodkin point eventually fell out of use during the 16th and 17th centuries, as armour largely ceased to be worn and firearms took over from archery.

== Armour penetration ==
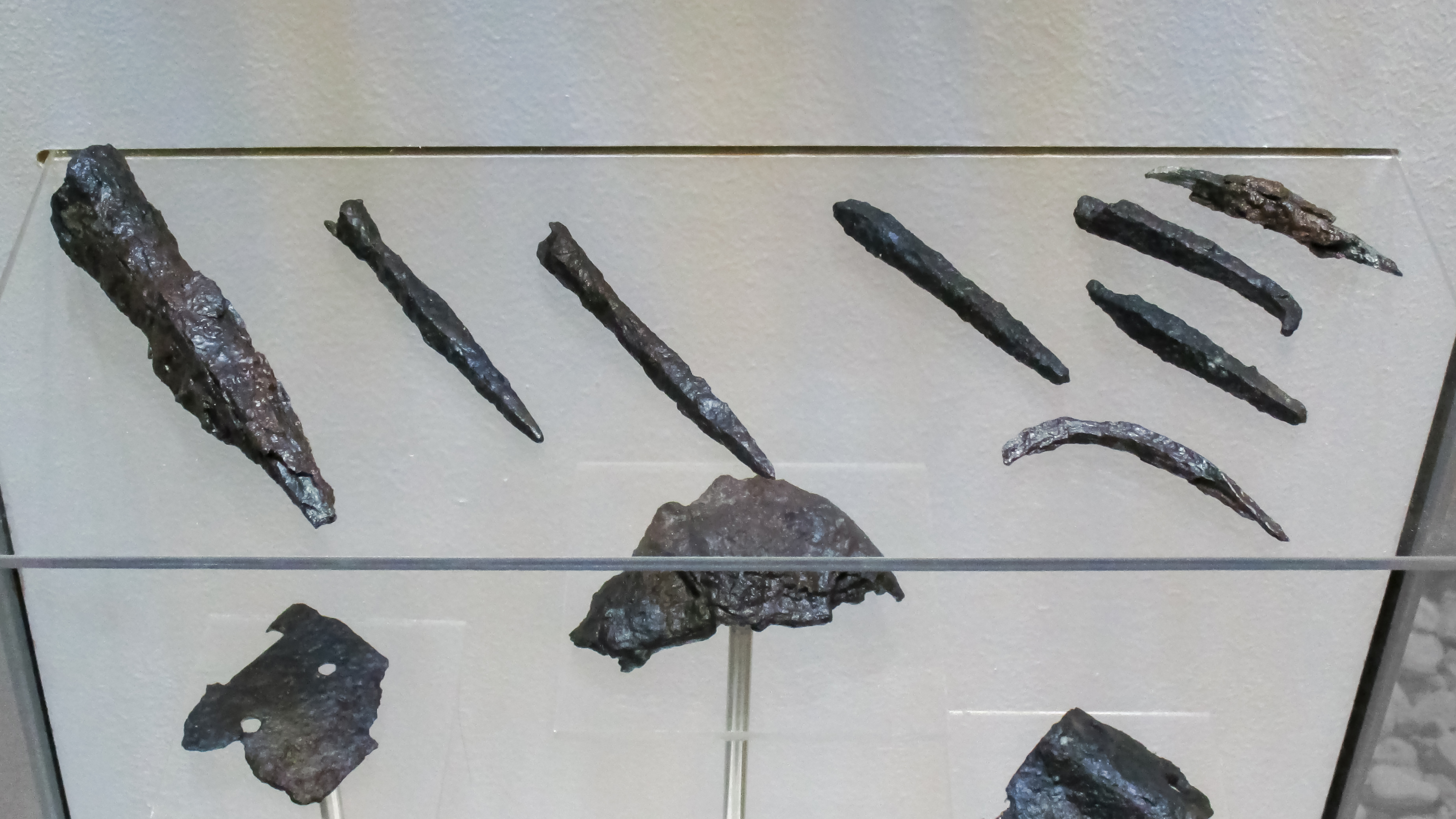
Medieval bodkin points from the 1361 Danish invasion of Gotland, displayed in Gotland Museum, Sweden. A couple of the bodkin points have been bent on impact.

In a modern test, a direct hit from a steel bodkin point penetrated mail armour from a range of seven yards. However, the test was conducted without a padded jack or gambeson, which was layered cloth armour worn under heavier armour for protection against projectiles.

Armour of the medieval era was not completely proof against arrows until the specialised armour of the Italian city-state mercenary companies. Archery was thought not to be effective against plate armour in the Battle of Neville's Cross (1346), the Battle of Bergerac (1345), and the Battle of Poitiers (1356); such armour became available to European knights and men at arms of fairly modest means by the late 14th century, though never to all soldiers in any army.

Testing by Matheus Bane in 2006 and David Jones in 2014 demonstrated that a bodkin point arrow shot from a longbow of ~75 pound draw weight at a distance of 10 yards could penetrate both gambeson and mail armour. In addition, Bane's testing demonstrated that a bodkin point arrow would also be able to penetrate plate armour of minimum thickness (1.2 mm), although likely not lethally. However, the arrowheads used in the Bane test were made of steel, while research by the Royal Armouries and the Historical Metallurgy Society suggests that a majority of medieval arrowheads were made from wrought iron instead.

Computer analysis by Mariusz Magier, Adrian Nowak and others published in 2017 found that heavy bodkin point arrows could penetrate typical plate armour of the time at 225 metres (738 ft). The depth of penetration would be slight at that range but would increase as the range closed or against armour lesser than the best quality available at the time.

In August 2019, the YouTube channel 'Tod's Workshop', together with historian Tobias Capwell (curator at the Wallace collection), Joe Gibbs (archer), Will Sherman (fletcher), and Kevin Legg (armourer) ran a practical test using a reproduction of a 15th century plate breastplate over a chainmail and gambeson against a 160 lbf (710 N) longbow. Both wrought iron and case hardened arrows were shot at the target from a distance of 25 meters. In contrast to the earlier computer analysis, neither arrow type successfully penetrated the breastplate.

== See also ==
- Bradmore arrow extractor, invented in 1403 and used on a bodkin point
- Odds bodkins, a medieval minced oath which reference the bodkin point
