= Botkin =

Botkin (Russian: Боткин) or Botkina (feminine; Боткина) is a common Russian or Scottish surname and is also a spelling variation of the Bodkin (surname) of Ireland, which may refer to:

- Benjamin A. Botkin (1901–1975), American folklorist and scholar
- Cordelia Botkin (1854–1910), American murderer
- Eugene Botkin (1865–1918), Russian court physician, father of Gleb and Tatiana
- Gleb Botkin (1900–1969), novelist and founder of the Church of Aphrodite, son of Eugene Botkin
- Jeremiah D. Botkin (1849–1921), U.S. Representative from Kansas
- Kirk Botkin (born 1971), American football player who performed in the National Football League; college football coach
- Max Botkin, American screenwriter and producer
- Mikhail Botkin (1839–1914), Russian artist
- Sean Botkin, American pianist
- Sergey Botkin (1832–1889), Russian clinician and therapist
- Vasily Botkin (1812–1869), critic and essayist, brother of Sergey Botkin
- Tatiana Botkina (1898–1986), daughter of Russian court physician Eugene Botkin
