= Odds bodkins =

Ancient English minced oath

Odds bodkins is an archaic English minced oath from the Middle Ages and later that is used as an exclamation of surprise.

Odds bodkins is generally considered to probably be a euphemism for "God's body" (or possibly "God's dear body"), although "God's dagger" or "God's [crucifixion] nails" has also been suggested as a possible source, as "bodkin" was current in the Middle Ages as a term for many small sharp implements: bodkin point, a narrow armor-piercing arrowhead; bodkin needle; dagger, stiletto or "nail dagger"; an awl-like leather-punching device; and a slim pointed multiple-use women's accessory (although this use may have come later).

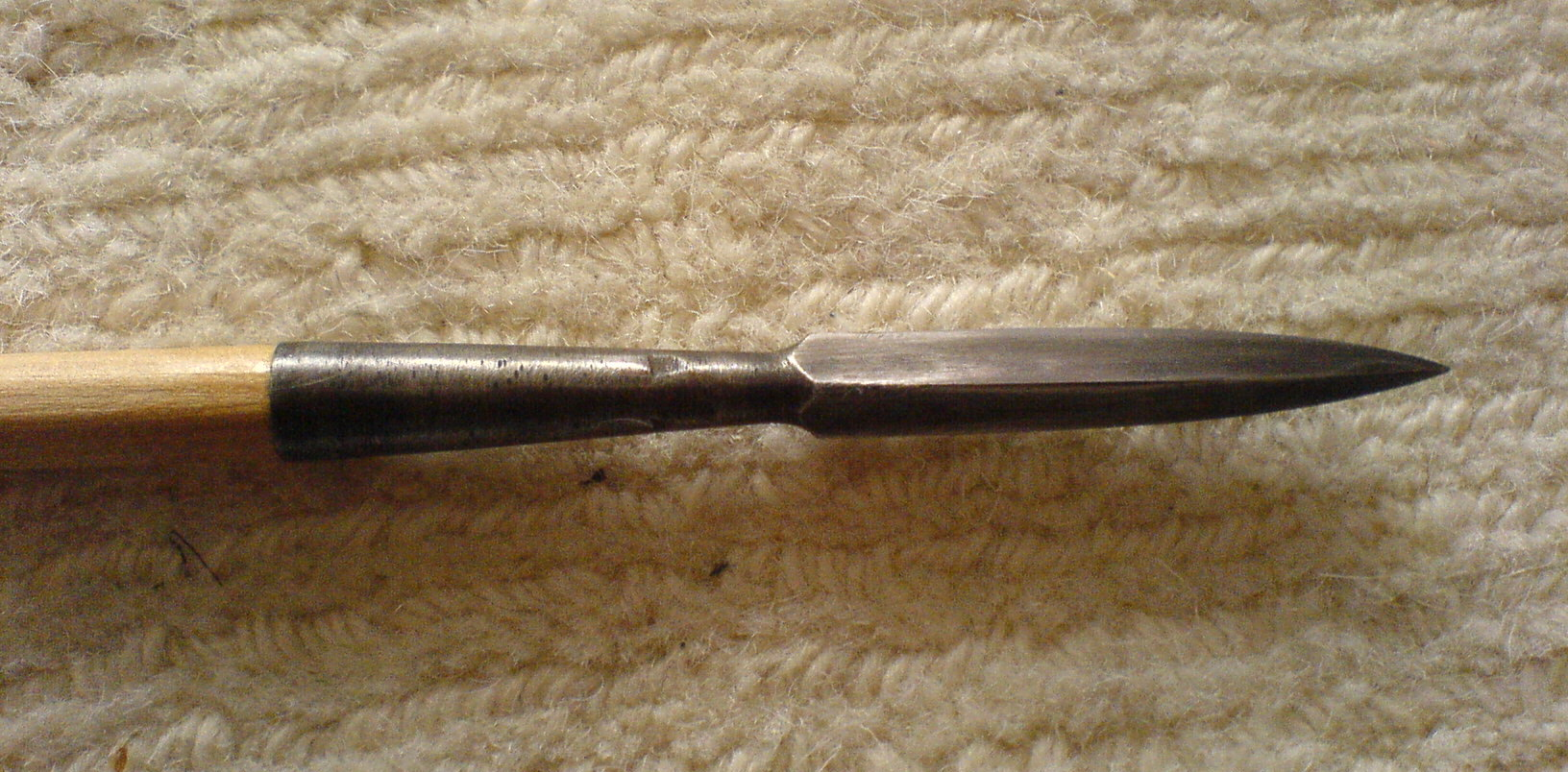
A bodkin arrowhead

Hamlet uses the term to describe a dagger in his "To be, or not to be" soliloquy (c. 1599), in which he says "When he himself might his quietus [death] make, with a bare bodkin?" Chaucer used the word "boidekin" in this sense in The Canterbury Tales ("But if he wolde be slain of Simkin, with panade, or with knif or boidekin..."), for example, as did some other writers around this time.

There are many variants of spelling and form, such as ods bodikin, odsbodikins, odds bud, oddsbud, gadsbodikins, adsbud, 'sbodikins, and others.

Henry Fielding was an early user of the oath in print, as his 1734 play Don Quixote in England puts "odsbodlikins" in the Don's mouth.

The etymology of "bodkin" is not known. It may be from Old French "bois de cuing", as Old French coign meant wedge, or peak of a helmet. Or it may be from Gaelic "biodag", the etymology of which is not known. John Minsheu (1671) suggested that it might be of Dutch origin. One known instance of "bidowe" occurred in Piers Plowman where it probably meant "dagger" and could possibly be related. Anglo-French beitequin (a small beetle) and many other possibilities have been mooted by various etymologists over the centuries. And bodkin itself has had a few other obscure and obsolete meanings.
