= Maud Bodkin =

English academic, writer and literary critic (1875-1967)

Amy Maud Bodkin
- Born: 1875; Chelmsford, Essex
- Died: 1967 (aged 91–92); Hatfield, Hertfordshire
- Writing career
- Subject: Classics
- Notable work: Archetypal Patterns in Poetry: Psychological Studies of Imagination

Amy Maud Bodkin (1875 in Chelmsford, Essex – 1967 in Hatfield, Hertfordshire) was an English classical scholar, writer on mythology, and literary critic. She is best known for her 1934 book Archetypal Patterns in Poetry: Psychological Studies of Imagination (London: Oxford University Press). It is generally taken to be a major work in applying the theories of Carl Jung to literature.

Bodkin's other main works are The Quest for Salvation in an Ancient and a Modern Play (London and New York: Oxford University Press, 1941) and Studies of Type-Images in Poetry, Religion and Philosophy (London and New York: Oxford University Press, 1951). She lectured at Homerton College, Cambridge from 1902 to 1914.

== Archetypal Patterns in Poetry ==
In Archetypal Patterns in Poetry, Bodkin applies Jung's theory of the collective unconscious to poetry, discovering a deep-seated primitive meaning behind recurring poetic images, symbols, and situations. She tried, as Boswell (1936: 553) quotes, "to bring psychological analysis and reflection to bear upon the imaginative experience communicated by great poetry, and to examine those forms or patterns in which the universal forces of our nature there find objectification."

Among the forms or archetypal patterns Bodkin presented, according to Boswell, may be included: the “Oedipus complex," the "rebirth archetype," the "archetype of Heaven and Hell," and "images of the Devil, the Hero, and God" (Boswell 1936: 553). Boswell goes on to write that Bodkin's "analyses and presentation are excellent; but the explanations, where any are attempted, seem inadequate to account for some very significant facts which the analyses have brought out" (Boswell 1936: 553).

On the other hand, Willcock (1936: 92) states that "the final impression left by Bodkin's book is one of unusual sensitiveness in reading and sincerity in recording experience." In addition, "Bodkin's pursuit of primordial symbols serves her determination to show, at least from one angle of approach, what poetry is and how it works. She holds herself back from slipping down the easy slope of paraphrase and prose meanings; neither does she drift into allegories and typifiyings" (Willcock 1936: 91).

Finally, Hooke (1935: 176) called Archetypal Patterns in Poetry, "a distinguished book; distinguished by acute reasoning, wide and deep learning, and a fine sensitiveness to poetic values. It is a courageous and, to a great extent, successful attempt to apply the technique of analytical psychology to the cloudy and elusive emotional patterns brought up into consciousness by the magic of great poetry.”

The texts Bodkin discusses in Archetypal Patterns in Poetry include those of Virgil, Dante, Shakespeare, Milton, and Coleridge (Hooke 1935: 176; Boswell 1936: 553; Willcock 1936: 91); Goethe and Euripides (Boswell 1936: 553); and Aeschylus, Shelley, T. S. Eliot, as well as the Christian Gospels (Hooke 1935: 177).

=== Discussion ===
At work in the poems of Milton and Aeschylus, for example, as well as in Shelley's Prometheus Unbound, is a fatherlike figure that Bodkin identifies as the Divine Despot (Bodkin 1934: 250; cited in Allgaier 1973: 1036).

The Divine Despot seems to be involved in the Heaven-and-Hell archetype, the kernel of which contains a "vital aspect" that is both positive and negative, and appears in space "as an image of loveliness with an ever attendant threatening shadow, a desolation beneath or around it" (Bodkin 1934: 122; cited in Shmiefsky 1967: 721).

Heaven, Hell, and the Divine Despot may descend to earth and have offspring in the Hamlet theme which involves a child's "ambivalent attitude" toward its parents and off of which are spun such variants as Oedipus and Orestes (Bodkin 1934: 11–15, cited in Williams 1973: 221), or all may remain at the divine level, as in the situation with Milton's God and Satan, or Aeschylus's Zeus and Prometheus:

"The antagonism between Prometheus and Zeus can partly be traced to a very general psychological tension, between the instinct of self-expression and rebellion against group values, and the opposite instinct to sustain those group values, and to merge personal claims in a greater power. Bodkin shows how Milton's Satan represents both these psychological forces at different times. Sometimes he is the heroic antagonist of tyranny, and sometimes a devilish enemy of group values, conceived to reside in the protection of God. In the mind of the reader there are these forces, sometimes inherited from very ancient times, and they may determine his response to the poetry quite independently of his conscious thinking about God, fate, and morality. As in the mind of poet or percipient the character of Satan alternates, so inversely the character of God must alternate too. In the Prometheus of Aeschylus are remembered dim fears that progress is wrong, inimical to the group; but also there are present instincts of self-assertion and rebellion. These instincts are connected with the infantile wishes and fears which still lurk in our minds. A poet may 'recall an infantile type of religious fear,' suggesting 'the Freudian doctrine of the father complex or imago, in relation to God.' 'The Freudian school of psychologists has asserted that the religious life represents a dramatisation on the cosmic plane of emotions which arose in the child's relation to his parents' " (Knight 1938: 53–54; citing Bodkin 1934: 191, 232 ff., 239, 242).

Complicating matters is the Rebirth archetype which, like the Heaven-and-Hell archetype, also involves a "vital aspect" that is simultaneously positive and negative, but which appears, not static, but rather "as a passage in time, from life to desolate death and beyond, to life renewed" (Bodkin 1934: 122; cited in Shmiefsky 1967: 721). In addition, there is a "night-journey stage within the pattern of Rebirth" (Bodkin 1934: 136; cited in Shmiefsky 1967: 735).

Rebirth is

"a movement, downward, or inward toward the earth's centre, or a cessation of movement—a physical change which … appears also as a transition toward severed relation with the outer world, and, it may be, toward disintegration and death. This element in the pattern is balanced by a movement upward and outward—an expansion or outburst of activity, a transition toward redintegration and life-renewal" (Bodkin 1934: 54; cited in Morgan 1971: 42).

Rebirth starts with frustration and has as its goal transcendence; between these two extends the "process of growth, or 'creative evolution,' in the course of which the constituent factors are transformed" (Bodkin 1934: 72; cited in Morgan 1971: 42).

Heaven, Hell, and Rebirth are related: "Heaven is mainly a garden in spring, Hell the scape of winter or a desert, and Rebirth an April violet" (Shmiefsky 1967: 721). Milton's Paradise Lost is an example of this interrelation of the two archetypes, where Bodkin claims that "it is as though the poet's feeling divined the relation of the concepts of Heaven and Hell to the images of spring's beauty and of the darkness under the earth whence beauty comes forth and to which it returns" (Bodkin 1963: 97; cited in Shmiefsky 1967: 735). Further interpatterning of the two archetypes, spatially and temporally, occurs when Satan emerges "upwards from his tremendous cavern below the realm of Chaos, to waylay the flower-like Eve in her walled Paradise and make her an inmate of his Hell, even as Pluto rose from beneath the earth to carry off Proserpine from her flowery meadow" (Bodkin 1934: 97–98; cited in Rosenman 1978: 12)

Above everything, the Star image "shines clear, for a moment between the opposites, between man and woman, between day and night; [it] fades and returns like the bloom of a flower, as the world's rhythms sweep on" (Bodkin 1934: 296; cited in Shmiefsky 1967: 725).

== Other readings, other writings ==
=== Letters and articles ===
Bodkin did not limit herself to the classics nor to Jung, however. She was also an astute reader of other important philosophers of the time. The July 1938 issue of Philosophy, for example, published a letter Bodkin wrote to the editor concerning Santayana:

"It seems to me that many philosophers are rightly realizing—to-day perhaps more than ever before—that our clearest renderings of reality, whether couched in austere conceptual terms or variegated with abundant imagery, may with equal justice be described as myths—myths in the sense of partial renderings of some human, historically conditioned standpoint of what necessarily transcends human grasp" (Bodkin 1938: 379).

While the same journal's issue of July 1940 presented this statement by her:

“In my own thought I have realized the importance of Professor Collingwood's principle. The process he describes of being 'burdened' with a problem that begins as a 'formless disturbance' and takes shape gradually in urgent questions, is a matter of the emotional no less than of the intellectual life. Those of us who genuinely hold liberal or democratic principles hold them, I would maintain, neither as habit nor as merely 'cerebral,' unemotional thought. Rather they are involved in our intellectual and emotional struggle with problems so deeply rooted within our individual and social life as to be virtually religious in character" (Bodkin 1940: 335).

Bodkin also grappled with the ideas of I. A. Richards and A. N. Whitehead, examining the latter's concept of the "Divine persuasion" in a 1945 article entitled "Physical Agencies and the Divine Persuasion" and the former's understanding of "truth in poetry" in an article of the same name, which concludes:

“As I clarify, through reflective analysis of imaginative communication, my intellectual references to those social objects—states and forces entering our common life—which the poet may portray through heroic figures, or name God, Devil, Heaven, Hell, I am at the same time ordering my emotional attitudes toward those objects. The gain which has come to those of us whom Dr. Richards's writings have stimulated to keener interest in the attitudes harmonized by poetry is enhanced, it seems to me, when we restore to those attitudes and references which Richards separates the unity claimed for them by the Philosophy of Organism" (Bodkin 1935: 472).

From 1950 to 1956 Maud Bodkin kept a journal (see Montella, I.Z. (1978) below in Other sources) which she recorded her comments on and observations about her extensive reading in many disciplines. Four themes which distinguish her critical theory are prominent in the journal. The first is the development of her understanding of the archetype. A second theme is the primacy of the encounter, a term which Bodkin derives from Martin Buber's I and Thou.The importance of the individual response to a work of art is the third prominent theme. Bodkin holds that the full meaning of a literary work can be apprehended only by pooling individual responses. Because Bodkin's tenuous hope that there is a divine persuasion influencing I-Thou encounters does not become certainty, the fourth theme involves Bodkin's struggle to express her individual perspective, the result of her meeting with the imaginative communication of truth (Montella 1978).

=== Bodkin's later books ===
Christian themes, along with those from "the great religions of the East" (cited in Hayward 1952), came to dominate Bodkin's later thought and writings, which may also have been influenced by her readings of Martin Buber, Gilbert Ryle, and Karl Jaspers (among others), as her 1944 letter to the editor of Philosophy, "Our Knowledge of One Another," and a 1956 article in the same journal, "Knowledge and Faith," seem to show. The title of Bodkin's short (54 pages) book, The Quest for Salvation in an Ancient and a Modern Play, substantiates one of her chief concerns. This book compares Aeschylus's Eumenides with themes in T. S. Eliot's The Family Reunion, the "modern play" which Bodkin had reviewed two years earlier, in May 1939.

As for Bodkin's last major work, Studies of Type-Images in Poetry, Religion and Philosophy, Carré (1952: 285) states that it "comprises loose meditations on religious themes, straying through a range of cloudy ideas and culling bunches of quotations from novelists, playwrights, poets and prophets." The "basic question" that Studies of Type-Images in Poetry, Religion and Philosophy explores was "suggested to the author by Martin Buber," while "the answer, insofar as any answer can be given, is derived from certain philosophical implications of Carl Jung's psychological studies" (Hayward 1952: 225). In this book, Bodkin tried "to understand and make some reasonable discrimination and choice among the type-images which are actually working among us and openly available to us in literary, ritualistic, or philosophical forms" (Hayward 1952: 225).

Hayward also states that Bodkin criticised "Freud's critique of religion on the grounds that he knew only Zeus or Jehovah, the paternal-authoritarian type of God, a God who never underwent birth, suffering, death, as did Dionysos or Jesus" (Hayward 1952: 226). In addition, Aldrich (1953: 153) points out that Studies of Type-Images in Poetry, Religion and Philosophy is "a sequel and supplement" to Archetypal Patterns in Poetry and that the theme of both books is "the current widespread idea that we have not wholly awakened out of the 'dream' of mythic consciousness, whose symbols are still exploited in great poetry and religion and even metaphysics."

Furthermore, "both books were written under the spell mainly of C. J. Jung, but also of Albert Schweitzer and Plato. Both use introspective, subjectivist methods of depth psychology, attempting to disclose or make explicit the 'archetypal patterns' of prelogical experience and culture" (Aldrich 1953: 153).

Some writers felt that the "type-image" of Bodkin's last book was a more fruitful concept than the "archetype" of her first. For example, Walter Sutton published an essay in 1960 which

"discusses C. G. Jung's concept of 'archetype' as it was used by various critics especially by Maud Bodkin. The conclusion of the discussion is to the effect that instead of 'archetype' we should rather use the concept of 'type-image' as Maud Bodkin did lately. We avoid thereby the dubious mythological and psychological connotations of the term: archetype—since the term ‘type-image’ admits the possibility of a historical succession of types without implying the existence of a unique prototype supposed to be the underlying substratum of all literary forms referring to a primordial ‘myth.’ The proposed new term retains the idea of uniformity and recurrence inherent in the idea of ‘archetype’ but makes us conceive literature as a culturally conditioned phenomenon valued not because of mythical uniformity but because of appreciation of historically varying originality” (Rieser 1962: 109).

== Publications ==
- Bodkin, M. (1934). Archetypal Patterns of Poetry: Psychological Studies of Imagination. London: Oxford University Press. [Subsequent printings retain pagination of the first edition.]
- Bodkin, M. (1935). Truth in Poetry. Philosophy 10(40):467–472.
- Bodkin, M. (1938). [Letter to the Editor.] Philosophy 13(51):379–380.
- Bodkin, M. (1939). The Eumenides and Present-Day Consciousness. [Review of T. S. Eliot's The Family Reunion.] Adelphi 15:411–413.
- Bodkin, M. (1940). [Letter to the Editor.] Philosophy 15(59):334–335.
- Bodkin, M. (1941). The Quest for Salvation in an Ancient and a Modern Play. London and New York: Oxford University Press.
- Bodkin, M. (1944). Our Knowledge of One Another. [Letter to the Editor.] Philosophy 19(73):190.
- Bodkin, M. (1945). Physical Agencies and the Divine Persuasion. Philosophy 20(76):148–161.
- Bodkin, M. (1951). Studies of Type-Images in Poetry, Religion and Philosophy. London and New York: Oxford University Press.
- Bodkin, M. (1956). Knowledge and Faith. Philosophy 31(117):131–141.

== See also ==
- Archetypal literary criticism
