= Bodkin Hazel Wood =

Biological site in Gloucestershire

Coordinates: 51.56344°N 2.31877°W

- Site of Special Scientific Interest
- Location of Bodkin Hazel Wood.
- Area of search: Avon
- Grid reference: ST780850
- Interest: Biological
- Area: 10.62 ha (26.2 acres)
- Notification date: 1974
- Location map: English Nature

Bodkin Hazel Wood (grid reference ST780850) is a 10.62-hectare (26.2-acre) biological Site of Special Scientific Interest (SSSI), just south of the village of Hawkesbury Upton in South Gloucestershire, notified in 1974.

== Biological interest ==
The site has a diverse ground flora. In addition to common species such as dog's mercury (Mercurialis perennis), primrose (Primula vulgaris), bluebell (Hyacinthoides non-scripta), wood anemone (Anemone nemorosa), wood sorrel (Oxalis acetosella) and ramsons (Allium ursinum), a number of scarce species are present; these include cow-wheat (Melampyrum pratense), herb Paris (Paris quadrifolia), toothwort (Lathraea squamaria), Autumn crocus (Colchicum autumnale), lily-of-the-valley (Convallaria majalis) and yellow star-of-Bethlehem (Gagea lutea).
