= John Bodkin (c. 1720 – 1742) =

- Born: c. 1720; Ireland
- Died: 1742 (aged 21–22); Ireland
- Cause of death: Execution by hanging, drawing and quartering
- Occupation: Esquire
- Known for: Murder conviction and subsequent execution

John Bodkin (c. 1720 – 1742), Esquire. Born the second son of Counsellor-at-law, John Bodkin and Mary Clarke of Carrowbeg House, Belclare, Tuam, County Galway, Ireland. In 1741, John Bodkin, the second son of a landed gentry family in Co Galway, Ireland was arrested on the charge of murdering his older brother, Dominick. He was found guilty of the crime even though he refused to admit his guilt during his trial or thereafter. He was hanged, drawn and quartered in Galway City on Saturday, 20 March 1742.

== Background ==
In 1739, John's older brother, Dominick, heir to the family estate, died. Lord Athenry, the local Justice of the Peace deemed his death as a natural event. The suggestion that he was murdered only came to light in the aftermath of the Bodkin murders in 1741. In this inheritance-motivated family feud, three members of the Bodkin family, Oliver Bodkin, Oliver's pregnant wife, Margery, his son, Oliver, a visitor, Marcus Lynch of Galway and from four to seven unnamed servants were murdered. On the gallows in 1741, a member of the Bodkin family convicted of the Bodkin murders, accused John Bodkin of murdering his older brother. On hearing the charge, John Bodkin absconded but was arrested shortly afterwards and charged with fratricide.

== Name of the murdered brother ==
The first name of John Bodkin's older brother, Dominick, has been clarified by a primary source that draws on a description of his trial in Pue’s Occurrences in 1742:

Yesterday (Friday, 19 Mar 1742) came on at the Assizes held here (Galway), the Trial of John Bodkin, Esq., for the murder of his eldest brother, Dominick Bodkin, Esq., on 3rd May 1739 ...

In contrast, Oliver J Burke referred to the victim as Patrick Bodkin rather than as Dominick Bodkin in his 1885 Anecdotes of the Connaught Circuit... (p 86–92). Burke may have exercised licence to avoid confusion with John's uncle, the infamous Dominick “Blind” Bodkin. In fact, Patrick was the younger rather than the older brother of John Bodkin. More recent accounts have followed Burke's naming of the victim as Patrick Bodkin, but Dominick Bodkin is used here following his identification, as the victim, by a primary source.

== Execution ==
When John Bodkin was found guilty of murdering his older brother, Dominick, his response mystified the clergy, the sheriff and the gentlemen of the city. On the gibbet at Gallows Green (now Eyre Square), Galway, he refused to acknowledge his innocence or guilt of the heinous crime of fratricide. Instead, as the noose tightened around his neck, he proclaimed, "I forgive Mankind", implying that he was not guilty. Despite his public pronouncement, he was hanged, drawn and quartered in 1742 as recorded in Pue’s Occurrences:

Last Saturday, John Bodkin Esq. was executed here; he neither confessed or denied the murder of his Brother; he was applied to by the High Sheriff and all the Gentlemen present to declare whether he was guilty or not; but could not be prevailed upon to give any Answer; after he pulled down his Cap and was just about to be thrown off, the Gentlemen and the Clergy begged he would satisfy the Publick of his Guilt or Innocence upon which he put back his Cap and begged they would let him die in Peace, and would make no other answer, but forgave Mankind; upon which he was thrown off and in 3 minutes cut down alive, his Privy Parts cut out, and his Bowels taken from him and his Head severed from his Body.
