= Dominick Dáll Bodkin =

Irish murderer (died 1740)

Dominick Dáll Bodkin (died 8 October 1740) was an Irish mass murderer.

== Biography ==
Bodkin was a member of The Tribes of Galway, and nicknamed Dáll ("Blind") because he was blind in one eye. Pockmarked and a heavy drinker, he had a notorious reputation in the area, and was estranged from his brother, Oliver Bodkin of Carrowbeg House, Belclare, Tuam.

Dominick Dáll lived at Carrowbeg House, in a townland about a mile west of Carrowbawn House. It was owned by another brother, Counsellor John Bodkin, who seems to have lived in Dublin apart from a few weeks each year. Counsellor John had two sons, John and Dominick. On a visit in 1737 the latter was found to have died in his sleep, though still a young man.

== Carrowbawn murders ==
In the following years, Dominick Dáll's other nephew, John fitz Oliver, fell out with his father. John fitz Oliver had lived in dissipation whilst studying law at Trinity College, Dublin, and removed himself. He went to live with Dominick Dáll at Carrowbeg. His father thereafter placed him on a stipend that he also wasted in dissipation where he then demanded increased funding from his father. His father refused to fund his licentious behaviour any further and, moreover, he altered his will in favour of his youngest son, Oliver fitz Oliver. To counter this, he and Dominick Dáll planned to kill Oliver Sr., his wife, and younger son. In this, they obtained the aid of John Hogan, a herdsman for the Bodkins and foster-father of Oliver fitz Oliver, and a ruffian surnamed Burke.

On the night of 18 September 1740 Dominick Dáll, John fitz Oliver and John Hogan met up and proceeded to Carrowbawn. They slit the throats of the dogs, entered the servants quarters where they killed them all (three men and two girls). Upon entering the house they killed the housekeeper and her husband. A visitor was found in the guest room, one Marcus Lynch; he too was killed, by John fitz Oliver, while John Hogan killed Mr. and Mrs. Bodkin. Hogan then attempted to kill the boy but could not bring himself to do it. Hogan smeared the boy with blood, hoping that Dominick and John would think him dead, but Dominick Dáll realised what he was doing. Dominick Dáll then killed the boy, apparently cutting off his head while doing so.

Francis II de Bermingham, Lord Athenry, arrived on the scene the following morning, having been alerted by the day-servants. The killers were caught, and lodged in the Bridewell in Tuam on the night of 6 October 1740. All three pleaded guilty, Dominick admitting to the murder of six of the eleven victims.

== Execution ==
Dáll, fitz Oliver and Hogan were brought to Claretuam crossroads, in sight of the scene of the crime. John fitz Oliver made a statement accusing his first cousin, John fitz Counsellor, of killing his brother Dominick at Carrowbeg House in 1737. The accused were hanged from a tree till dead. Dominick Dáll and John Bodkin were gibbeted, while John Hogan's head was placed on a spike atop the market house in Tuam. Their bodies were buried under the tree at Claretuam crossroads.

John fitz Counsellor then fled the scene and was later apprehended in a bog on 22 October. He was committed to trial the following March at Ennis, found guilty of the murder of his brother. He refused to either confirm or deny his culpability and was promptly hanged and his head cut off.

As late as the 1950s, stories of Dominick Dáll Bodkin's unsavoury activities were told in the area.

== Bibliography ==
- The Bodkin Murders, in The Galway Reader, pp. 123–127, c.1956, Jarlath A. O'Connell
- Anecdotes of the Connaught Circle, p. 92 1885 Hodges, Figgis, Oliver Joseph Burke
