= Thomas Bodkin =

Irish lawyer, art historian, art collector and curator

Professor Thomas Bodkin KCSG
- Bodkin in 1945
- Born: Thomas Patrick Bodkin; 21 July 1887; Dublin, Ireland
- Died: 24 April 1961 (aged 73); Birmingham, England
- Resting place: Glasnevin Cemetery, Dublin
- Education: Belvedere College; Clongowes Wood College; Royal University of Ireland (BCL)
- Occupations: Barrister; Art historian; Curator
- Known for: Director of the National Gallery of Ireland; Founding director of the Barber Institute of Fine Arts
- Spouse: Aileen Cox (m. 1917)
- Children: 5
- Parent(s): Matthias McDonnell Bodkin; Arabella Norman
- Relatives: Matthias Bodkin (brother)

Professor Thomas Patrick Bodkin KCSG (21 July 1887 – 24 April 1961) was an Irish barrister and art collector who became an art historian and curator.

Bodkin was Director of the National Gallery of Ireland in Dublin from 1927 to 1935 and founding Director of the Barber Institute of Fine Arts in Birmingham from 1935 until 1952, where he acquired the nucleus of the collection described by The Observer as "the last great art collection of the twentieth century."

== Biography ==
Bodkin was born into an upper-middle-class Catholic family in Dublin, the eldest of the six children of Arabella (née Norman) and Matthias McDonnell Bodkin, a nationalist journalist, judge and Member of Parliament; his brother Matthias Jr. became a Jesuit priest and author, while two of his sisters became nuns. Bodkin was educated at Belvedere College and Clongowes Wood College, then graduated from the Royal University of Ireland in 1908 with a Bachelor of Civil Law degree. He was called to the Irish Bar in 1911 and practised law while collecting art privately, influenced by his close friend Sir Hugh Lane. With the death of Lane in the sinking of the RMS Lusitania in 1915, Bodkin was charged with ensuring that Lane's collection of art was displayed in Dublin – a dispute that would only finally be settled in 1957 and about which Bodkin was to write Hugh Lane and his Pictures in 1932.

Bodkin left the legal profession in 1916 to become a Governor of the National Gallery of Ireland, being appointed Director in 1927. He also served in 1926 on the committee that commissioned the design of the new coinage of the Republic of Ireland from Percy Metcalfe. In 1917, Bodkin married Aileen Cox, with whom he had five daughters.

In 1935 Bodkin left Ireland on being appointed Director of the newly established Barber Institute of Fine Arts and Barber Professor of Fine Art at the University of Birmingham. The funds available to the Barber Institute for the purchase of new works compared favourably even to some national museums and Bodkin was able to make a string of exceptional purchases in the depressed art market around the time of the Second World War. The collection that in 1935 had numbered just seven works, by 1939 held major pieces such as Tintoretto's Portrait of a Youth (1554), Simone Martini's St. John the Evangelist (1320), Poussin's Tancred and Erminia (1634), Whistler's Symphony in White, No. 3 (1867) and John van Nost the Elder's Equestrian Statue Of George I (circa 1717). Bodkin retired in 1952 but retained control over acquisitions until 1959 – his successor as Director and Professor Ellis Waterhouse wistfully referred to Bodkin's wayward later purchases as "Acts of Bod".

Bodkin was also an active broadcaster and author, publishing personal reminiscences and translations of modern French poetry as well as works of art history and criticism. In particular, his The Approach to Painting (1927), an introduction for a popular audience, ran through many editions over the succeeding 30 years.

In his final years, he was a frequent guest on the BBC panel show Animal, Vegetable, Mineral?, identifying curiosities from around the world. Bodkin appeared on the programme six times, beginning with the first episode and ending with the penultimate episode of its original run. In the latter episode, one of only a few which survive in the BBC's archives, he appeared on the panel alongside fellow gallery curator Hugh Shortt and archaeologist Mortimer Wheeler, the programme's regular expert panellist.

Bodkin was a devout Catholic who is said to have hung the papal flag from his house in Dublin on appropriate holidays. He was awarded the Civil Division of the Order of St. Gregory the Great for services to his church. A bust of Bodkin, previously exhibited at the Royal Academy in 1958, was donated to the Barber by its sculptor, Sir Charles Wheeler, President of the Royal Academy and a personal friend of Bodkin's, on the latter's death. Bodkin died in Birmingham on 24 April 1961, at the age of 73. His remains were interred in Glasnevin Cemetery, Dublin.

He was the subject of This Is Your Life in March 1960 when he was surprised by Eamonn Andrews at the BBC's Gosta Green Studios in Birmingham.
