= Matthias McDonnell Bodkin =

Irish lawyer, journalist, nationalist politician and author

- Born: 8 October 1850
- Died: 7 June 1933 (aged 82)
- Occupations: Author; Journalist; Newspaper editor; Barrister; King's Counsel; County Court Judge; MP
- Known for: Irish nationalism
- Spouse: Arabella Norman
- Children: 6
- Parent(s): Thomas and Maria (née McDonnell) Bodkin

Matthias McDonnell Bodkin (8 October 1850 – 7 June 1933) was an Irish nationalist politician and MP in the House of Commons of the United Kingdom of Great Britain and Ireland and Anti-Parnellite representative for North Roscommon, 1892–95, a noted author, journalist and newspaper editor, barrister (King's Counsel (K.C.)), and County Court Judge for County Clare, 1907–24.

== Early life ==
Bodkin was the second son of a doctor, Thomas Bodkin, MD FRCSI, of Tuam, County Galway (a descendant of Tribes of Galway). His mother was Maria McDonnell of Westport, County Mayo, a cousin of Antony MacDonnell, 1st Baron MacDonnell (1844–1925). Bodkin was educated at the Christian Brothers' school, Tuam and at Tullabeg Jesuit College. He had wanted to go to the Anglican Trinity College Dublin but his family objected on religious grounds and he attended the Catholic University of Ireland, which had a strong Roman Catholic ethos, instead. He was scathing about this experience:

"It is true I entered the so-called Catholic University, which had neither charter or endowment, and even obtained an exhibition on matriculation, but the business was so wholly futile that I abandoned it before six months was over, sacrificing my exhibition. A smattering of Terence was the only asset derived from that wasted six months."

== Career ==
=== Early legal career ===
Bodkin was called to the Irish Law Bar in 1877 and entered practice as a barrister on the Connaught circuit.

=== Journalistic career ===
Bodkin's journalistic career began with reporting work for the Freeman's Journal while he was still a law student. He became politically active at the time of the Criminal Law and Procedure (Ireland) Act 1887, and defended a number of Irish Nationalists in court. He first came to political prominence at the time of the split in the Irish Parliamentary Party over the leadership of Charles Stewart Parnell, when Bodkin was a major protagonist on the anti-Parnellite Irish National Federation side.

As deputy to William O'Brien, editor of the newspaper United Ireland, he was in charge of the paper in O'Brien's absence in the US at the time of the split in December 1890, and brought it firmly out against Parnell. He was ousted from the editor's office by force when Parnell and his supporters reclaimed the paper. He published an alternative Suppressed United Ireland and then The Insuppressible, which appeared up to 24 January 1891. Thereafter Bodkin was a leader writer on the Insuppressible's anti-Parnellite successor, the National Press.

=== Political career ===
At Timothy Healy's urging, Bodkin stood for parliament against the veteran Parnellite J. J. O'Kelly at North Roscommon in 1892, winning by 3,251 votes to 3,199, a margin of only 52 votes. He later wrote an account of the election campaign (and of his legal experiences) in White Magic (1897). He stood down at the end of his first term in 1895, saying that he could not afford to continue losing earnings from the Bar: "my poverty, and not my will, refused". O'Kelly regained the seat. Thereafter Bodkin was chief leader writer on the Freeman's Journal. He cofounded The Irish Packet in 1903.

=== Later legal career ===
Bodkin's appointment as a county court judge in 1907 was controversial among Nationalists who thought that offices should not be accepted from the British regime. The appointment was subjected to an unsuccessful legal challenge on the ground that Bodkin had retired from the Bar at the time; when asked in Parliament what had induced the (illiterate) complainant to lodge his affidavit against Bodkin, the then Chief Secretary for Ireland, Augustine Birrell, replied, apparently with complete truth: ‘A pint of porter’. Maume (1999, p. 92) says Bodkin had ‘dubious legal qualifications’, but there is no doubt that he had wide experience as a barrister and on his own account had defended some twenty people on capital charges. While a judge in 1921, Bodkin published accounts of abuses by the Black and Tans in County Clare, which received wide publicity.

== Writings ==
Bodkin was a prolific author, in a wide range of genres, including history, novels (contemporary and historical), plays, and political campaigning texts. The catalogues of the British Library and National Library of Ireland list some 39 publications between them. Some books were published under the pen name Crom a Boo.

Bodkin earned a place in the history of the detective novel by virtue of his invention of the first detective family. His character Paul Beck, a private detective with comfortable lodgings in Chester, was an Irish Sherlock Holmes with a very original yet logical method for detecting crime. Beck first appeared in Paul Beck, the rule of thumb detective in 1898; two years later Bodkin's creation Dora Myrl, the lady detective, made her first appearance. In The Capture of Paul Beck (1909), Bodkin had them marry each other and in 1911 their son appeared, in Paul Beck, a chip off the old block. Other titles in this series were The Quests of Paul Beck (1908), Pigeon Blood Rubies (1915) and Paul Beck, detective (1929).

Bodkin's historical novel Lord Edward Fitzgerald (1896) was dedicated to William Gladstone with the latter's permission. It was one of three novels set at the time of the Irish Rebellion of 1798. Bodkin's autobiography Recollections of an Irish Judge is a valuable historical source, particularly on the Parnellite split, although being published when he was only 64 it does not cover the last 20 years of his life. Its title is misleading since it contains little on Bodkin's life as a judge, but a great deal on his experiences in politics and journalism.

=== Selected publications ===
- “The Devil's Work" on the Clanricarde Estate. London: Irish Press Agency, 1890.
- Poteen Punch: strong, hot and sweet, made and mixed by “Crom a Boo”, being a succession of Irish after-dinner stories, etc.. Dublin: M. H. Gill & Son, 1890.
- Lord Edward Fitzgerald, An historical romance. Dublin: Talbot Press, 1896.
- White Magic: a novel. London: Chapman & Hall, 1897.
- In the days of Goldsmith. London: J. Long, 1903.
- Patsey the Omadaun. London: Chatto & Windus, 1904.
- The quests of Paul Beck. London: T. Fisher Unwin, 1908.
- The capture of Paul Beck. London: T. Fisher Unwin, 1909.
- Grattan’s Parliament, before and after. London: T. Fisher Unwin, 1912.
- Recollections of an Irish Judge: Press, Bar and Parliament. London: Hurst & Blackett, 1914.
- Pigeon-Blood Rubies. London: Eveleigh Nash, 1915.
- Ulster’s Opportunity: a united Ireland, by an Irish K.C. Dublin: Duffy, 1917.
- Famous Irish Trials. Dublin & London: Maunsel, 1918 (reissued, Dublin: Ashfield Press, 1997).
- When Youth Meets Youth. Dublin, Talbot Press; London: T. Fisher Unwin, 1920.
- A Judicial Report on the devastation of County Clare. Dublin: Talbot Press, 1921.
- Blessed Bernadette. Dublin: Irish Messenger, 1929.
- Guilty or Not Guilty?. Dublin: Talbot Press, 1929.

== Personal life ==
In 1885 he married Arabella, daughter of Francis Norman of Dublin, and they had six children.

Their son Matthew Jr. (born 1896), became a Jesuit priest and a well-known author mainly of religious works, while their son Thomas Bodkin became the Director of the National Gallery of Ireland, and two of their daughters became nuns.

== Sources ==
- Irish Independent, 8 June 1933
- F. S. L. Lyons, The Fall of Parnell 1890–91, London, Routledge & Kegan Paul, 1960
- Patrick Maume, The Long Gestation: Irish Nationalist Life 1891–1918, Dublin, Gill & MacMillan, 1999
- Brian M. Walker (ed.), Parliamentary Election Results in Ireland, 1801–1922, Dublin, Royal Irish Academy, 1978
- Who Was Who, 1929–1940

Parliament of the United Kingdom
Preceded by James Joseph O'Kelly	Member of Parliament for North Roscommon; 1892 – 1895	Succeeded by James Joseph O'Kelly
