= 2019 Galway City Council election =

Part of the 2019 Irish local elections

- 24 May 2019

All 18 seats on Galway City Council 10 seats needed for a majority
	First party	Second party	Third party
Party	Fianna Fáil	Fine Gael	Green
Seats won	5	3	2
Seat change	▲2	▼1	▲2
	Fourth party	Fifth party	Sixth party
Party	Labour	Social Democrats	Independent
Seats won	1	1	6
Seat change	▼1	▲1	Steady
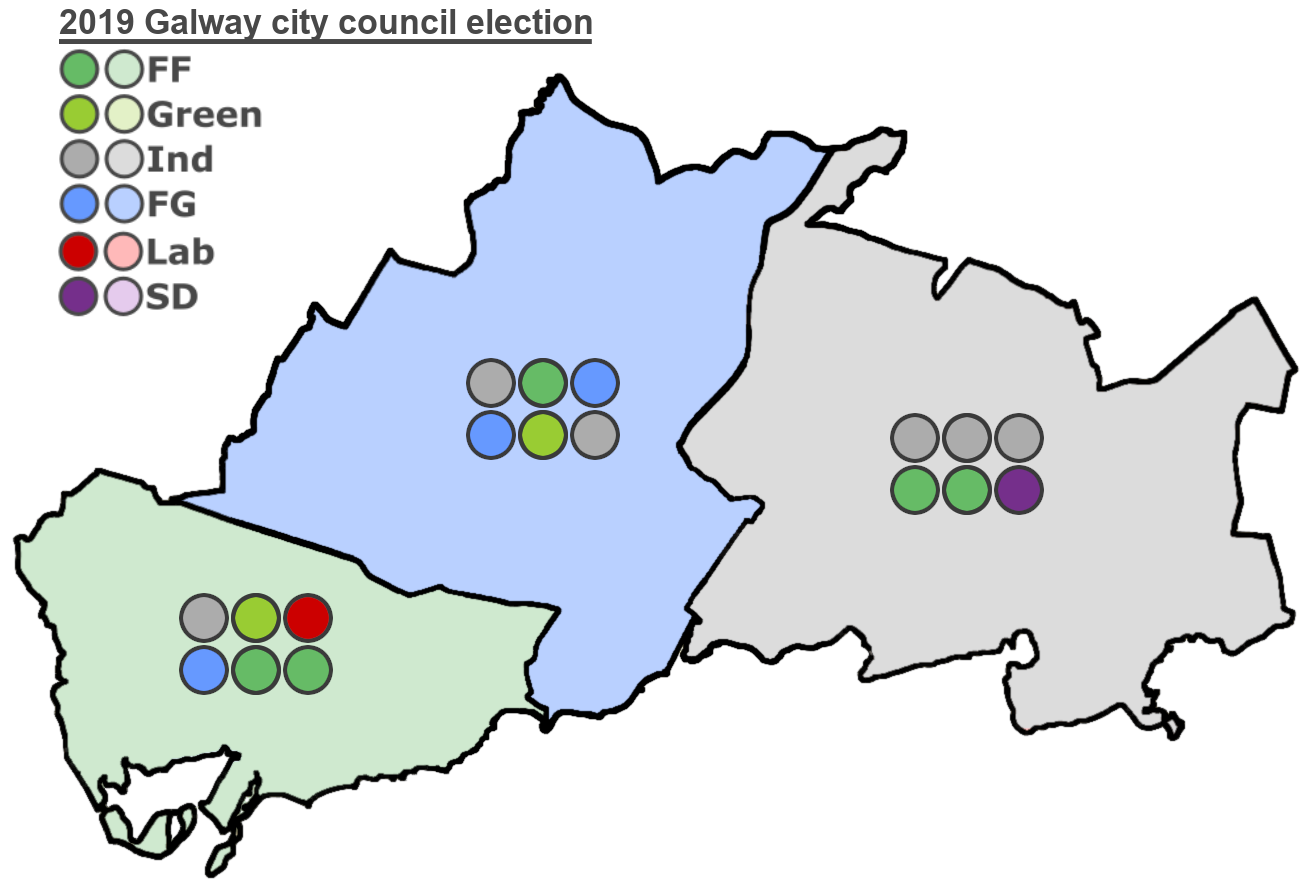
- First preference vote and seat totals by local electoral area. As this is a STV election, seat totals are determined by popular vote and preferences in each local electoral area.
Council control after election
TBD

An election to all 18 seats on Galway City Council was held in Galway in Ireland on 24 May 2019 as part of the 2019 Irish local elections. Councillors were elected for a five-year term of office from 3 local electoral areas (LEAs) on the electoral system of proportional representation by means of the single transferable vote (PR-STV).

== Boundary review ==
Following a recommendation of the 2018 LEA boundary review committee, the only change to the areas used at the 2014 election was to move the electoral division of Claddagh from the West LEA to the Central LEA in line with population changes revealed by the 2016 census.

== Overview ==
Fianna Fáil became the largest party on the City Council gaining 2 seats in the process. Fine Gael lost 1 seat despite slightly increasing their vote. The Green Party emerged as the big winners winning 2 seats; 1 in each of Galway City Central and Galway City West and a nearly 5 fivefold increase in voteshare. Following two recounts the Social Democrats held onto a seat in Galway City East at the expense of Sinn Féin, and lost a seat in City Central to the Greens. Sinn Féin lost all their seats as their vote collapsed almost in half. To a significant extent the rise in support for both the Social Democrats and the Greens contributed to the loss for Sinn Féin.

== Results by party ==
Party	Seats	±	1st pref	FPv%	±%
Fianna Fáil	5	▲2	4,848	20.47	▲0.97
Fine Gael	3	▼1	3,752	15.85	▲0.05
Green	2	▲2	2,230	9.42	▲7.23
Labour	1	▼1	1,651	6.97	▼3.83
Social Democrats	1	▲1	1,419	5.99	New
Sinn Féin	0	▼3	1,272	5.37	▼4.13
Aontú	0	Steady	574	2.42	New
People Before Profit	0	Steady	377	1.59	▲1.00
Renua	0	Steady	225	0.95	New
Solidarity	0	Steady	203	0.86	▼3.65
Independent	6	Steady	7,134	30.13	▼6.97
Total	18	Steady	23,679	100.00	

== Results by local electoral area ==
*: Outgoing councillor elected in 2014.
†: Outgoing councillor coopted subsequent to the 2014 election.

=== Galway City Central ===
Galway City Central: 6 seats
Party	Candidate	FPv%	Count										
Party	Candidate	FPv%	1	2	3	4	5	6	7	8	9	10	11
Independent	Mike Cubbard	16.16%	1,292										
Fianna Fáil	Ollie Crowe (Note: See change below.)	12.61%	1,008	1,024	1,036	1,053	1,065	1,072	1,160				
Fine Gael	Eddie Hoare	10.68%	854	866	881	937	951	967	1,023	1,108	1,109	1,188	
Fine Gael	Frank Fahy	8.68%	694	709	721	757	780	790	833	927	931	1,010	1,029
Green	Martina O'Connor	6.80%	544	552	571	590	618	684	720	769	768	912	924
Labour	John McDonagh	6.59%	527	547	579	602	636	656	694	759	768		
Social Democrats	Sharon Nolan	6.44%	515	525	534	539	576	741	762	793	788	870	873
Independent	Colette Connolly	6.17%	493	510	526	551	590	648	701	800	804	963	974
Fianna Fáil	Imelda Byrne	6.13%	490	497	516	535	551	568	609				
Aontú	Cormac Ó Corcoráin	5.37%	429	434	453	481	493	517					
People Before Profit	Joe Loughnane	4.71%	377	386	396	413	468						
Sinn Féin	Mark Lohan	4.10%	328	336	342	345							
Independent	Mike Geraghty	3.04%	243	256	273								
Independent	James O'Toole	1.55%	124	128									
Independent	Daragh O'Flaherty	1.04%	83	86									
Independent	Patrick Feeney	0.01%	1	2									
Electorate: 16,241 Valid: 7,996 Spoilt: 150 Quota: 1,143 Turnout: 8,146 (50.16%)

=== Galway City East ===
Galway City East: 6 seats
Party	Candidate	FPv%	Count												
Party	Candidate	FPv%	1	2	3	4	5	6	7	8	9	10	11	12	13
Independent	Declan McDonnell	14.71%	1,090												
Fianna Fáil	Alan Cheevers	12.97%	961	967	977	979	993	1,004	1,021	1,049	1,052	1,079			
Independent	Terry O'Flaherty	12.65%	937	942	957	965	997	1,025	1,044	1,071					
Fianna Fáil	Michael John Crowe	10.19%	755	759	763	766	779	791	797	818	819	845	868	972	978
Independent	Noel Larkin	9.11%	675	687	694	701	722	739	751	761	762	811	849	1,006	1,015
Sinn Féin	Mairéad Farrell	7.04%	522	529	544	546	557	571	617	625	626	659	727	772	772
Fine Gael	John Walsh	6.15%	456	463	468	471	475	486	489	577	581	603	645		
Social Democrats	Owen Hanley	5.57%	413	416	417	418	428	447	502	513	514	537	728	786	790
Green	Claire Hillery	5.16%	382	385	388	388	398	422	455	467	467	495			
Renua	Neil O'Mahony	3.04%	225	230	287	288	300	303	309	316	317				
Fine Gael	Donal Lynch	2.91%	216	216	218	219	240	249	250						
Solidarity	Conor Burke	2.74%	203	207	211	212	219	239							
Labour	Liam Boyle	2.47%	183	187	190	191	200								
Independent	Michael Tully	2.46%	182	184	189	190									
Aontú	Nuala Nolan	1.96%	145	145											
Independent	Pat Hardiman	0.88%	65												
Electorate: 15,370 Valid: 7,410 Spoilt: 118 Quota: 1,059 Turnout: 7,528 (48.98%)

=== Galway City West ===
Galway City West: 6 seats
Party	Candidate	FPv%	Count								
Party	Candidate	FPv%	1	2	3	4	5	6	7	8	9
Independent	Donal Lyons	17.68%	1,463								
Green	Pauline O'Reilly	15.76%	1,304								
Labour	Níall McNelis	11.37%	941	1,030	1,062	1,070	1,085	1,105	1,152	1,243	
Fianna Fáil	Peter Keane	10.88%	900	935	940	944	946	965	987	1,016	1,059
Fine Gael	Clodagh Higgins	9.80%	811	851	867	871	878	890	916	941	1,040
Fianna Fáil	John Connolly	8.87%	734	764	769	775	779	808	825	891	960
Fine Gael	Pearce Flannery	8.72%	721	752	759	761	769	772	786	809	882
Social Democrats	John Crowley	5.93%	491	503	540	548	566	574	613	705	
Sinn Féin	Cathal Ó Conchúir	5.10%	422	434	440	444	455	461	473		
Independent	Marian Maloney	2.21%	183	198	204	210	222	240			
Independent	Tommy Roddy	1.66%	137	145	147	160	166				
Independent	Marc Anderson	1.10%	91	95	98	111					
Independent	Darius Ivan	0.36%	30	33	34						
Independent	Claire Keegan	0.36%	30	31	33						
Independent	Patrick Feeney	0.18%	15	16	16						
Electorate: 16,574 Valid: 8,273 Spoilt: 125 Quota: 1,182 Turnout: 8,398 (50.67%)

== Changes ==
=== Co-options ===
Party	Outgoing	LEA	Reason	Date	Co-optee
Green	Pauline O'Reilly	Galway City West	Elected to 26th Seanad at the 2020 Seanad election	May 2020	Niall Murphy
Fianna Fáil	Ollie Crowe	Galway City Central	Elected to 26th Seanad at the 2020 Seanad election	8 June 2020	Imelda Byrne
Social Democrats	Owen Hanley	Galway City East	Resigned	January 2023	Alan Curran

=== Changes in affiliation ===
Name	LEA	Elected as	New affiliation	Date
Noel Larkin	Galway City East	Independent	Independent Ireland	March 2024
