= 2018 visit by Catherine Connolly to Syria =

- The Irish tour group meeting with Fares Shehabi in Aleppo
- Date: June 2018
- Venue: Beirut–Rafic Hariri International Airport, Damascus International Airport, Yarmouk Camp, Aleppo Chamber of Industry
- Location: Beirut, Lebanon, Damascus, Syria, Aleppo, Syria
- Type: "fact-finding mission", according to Connolly
- Organised by: Mick Wallace, Clare Daly, Elaine Daly
- Website: www.catherineconnollyforpresident.ie/statement-9-10-25-syria

For a week in June 2018, a 15-member Irish delegation that included Catherine Connolly, Mick Wallace, Clare Daly and Maureen O'Sullivan, visited Ba'athist Syria. They flew to Beirut, Lebanon, and then flew from there to Damascus, Syria. They visited the Palestinian refugee camp Yarmouk Camp, where they met military commander Saed Abd Al-Aal. They then travelled to Aleppo's Chamber of Industry, where they met UNICEF workers and Syrian member of parliament, Fares Shehabi.

Syria was in a civil war at the time, where Abd Al-Aal and Shehabi both supported Bashar al-Assad, the country's dictator. In the 2025 Irish presidential election, which Connolly was running in, it resurfaced as a point of controversy. Connolly said she self-funded the trip at the launch of her campaign, later clarifying it came from her taxpayer-funded Parliamentary Activities Allowance. The visit was approved by Ba'athist Syria's government, who issued the group visas.

== Background ==
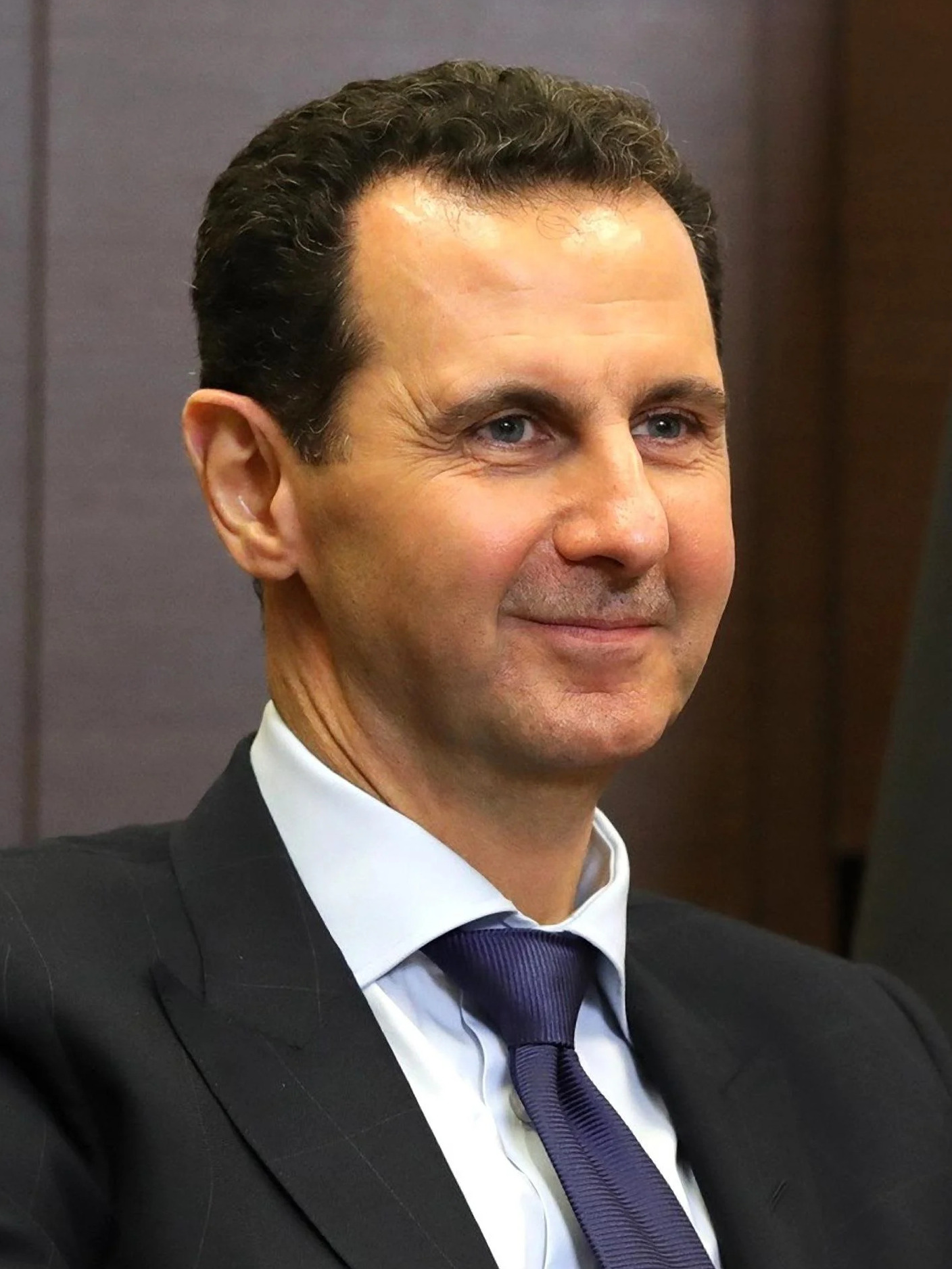
Assad (left) and Shehabi (right).

Bashar Hafez al-Assad is a former Syrian politician, medical doctor, and military officer who served as the president of Syria from 2000 until his overthrow in 2024 after the Syrian civil war, which started in 2011. His rule as president was a highly personalist dictatorship that governed Syria as a totalitarian police state, becoming arguably more repressive than his father. In August 2026, Assad was convicted of war crimes and crimes against humanity by a Syrian court and sentenced to death in absentia.

The Free Palestine Movement (FPM) was originally founded as a social organisation in 2011 at Yarmouk Camp, before turning into a pro-Assad militia. Saed Abd Al-Aal is FPM's military commander. Fares Shehabi is a Syrian businessman and politician. Shebabi is an outspoken supporter of Assad, and was placed under European Union (EU) sanctions in 2011 for his economic support to the Assad regime. In 2017, he called for Bana al-Abed's death on Twitter (now called X), saying, "it's better this little witch die before she starts with her sponsors WW3" [sic]. She was seven at the time. At the time of the Irish delegation's visit, he was an independent member of Syria's parliament, and head of Aleppo's Chamber of Industry. Prior to visiting Syria, Connolly supported the idea of re-evaluating the impact of International sanctions against Syria, saying that the EU and US sanctions against the country were doing more harm to civilians than good.

== Timeline ==
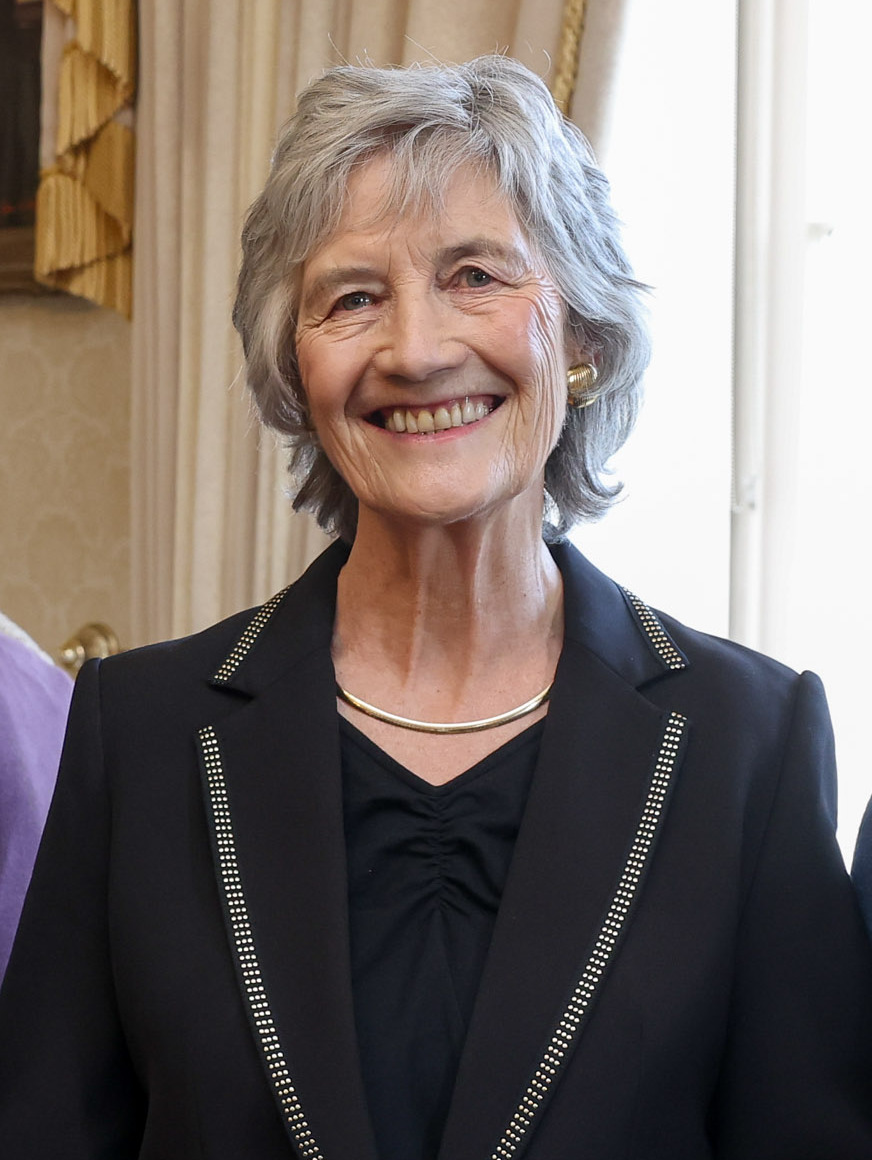
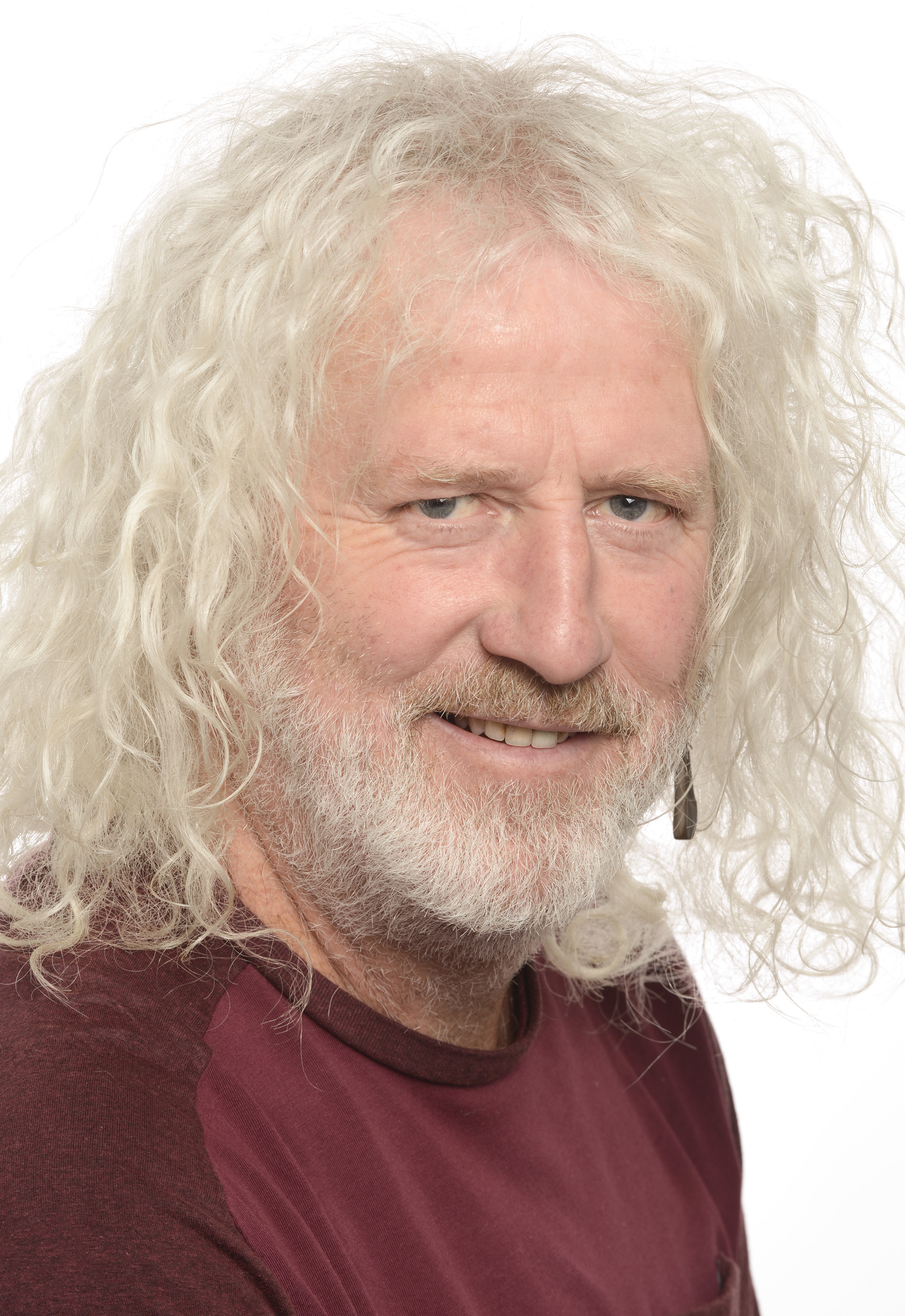
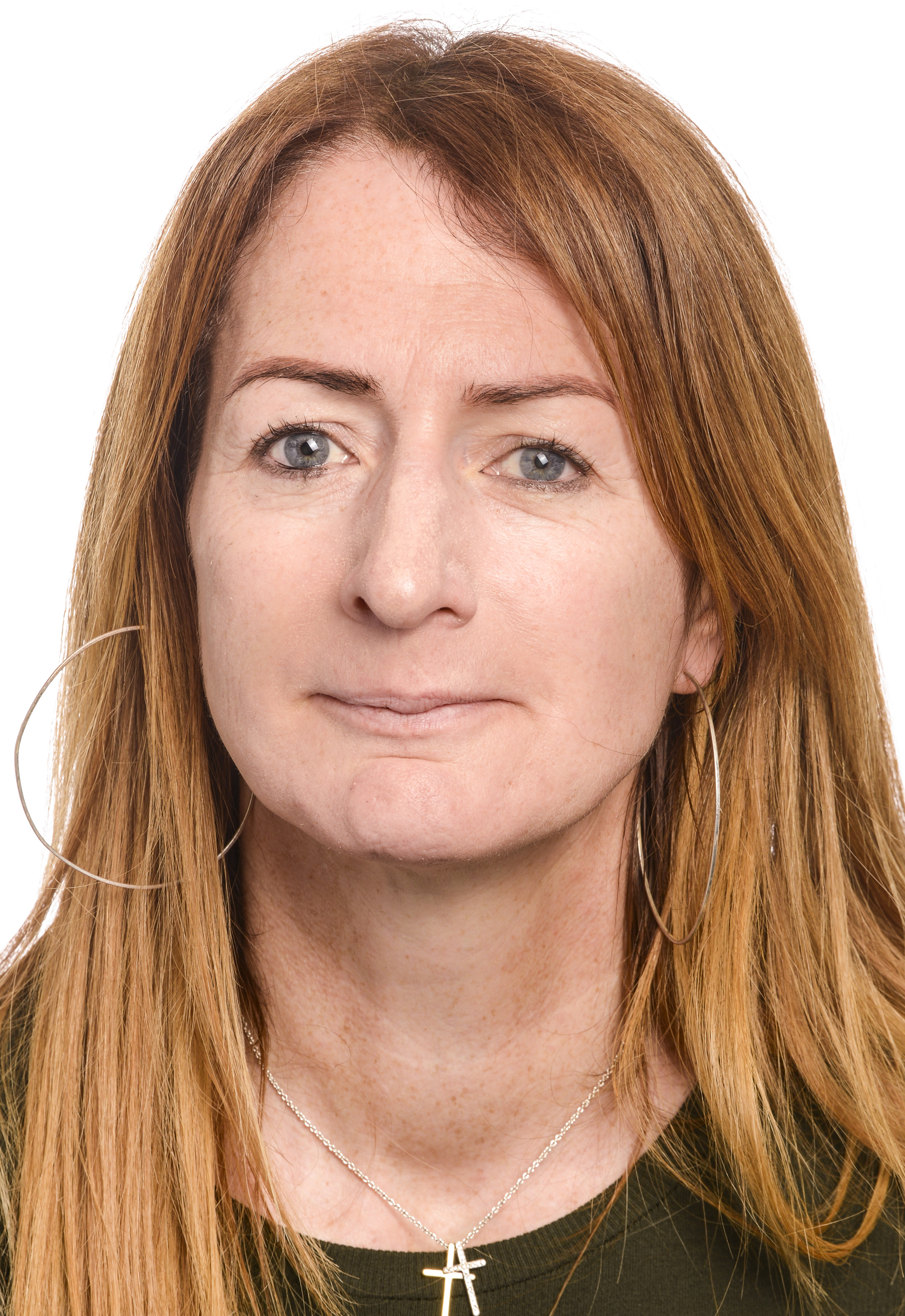
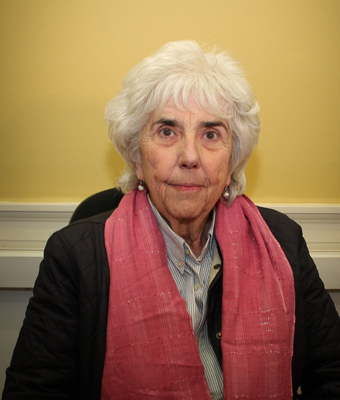
The TDs who were part of the Irish delegation. Clockwise from top left; Catherine Connolly, Mick Wallace, Clare Daly, and Maureen O'Sullivan.

Catherine Connolly, along with Mick Wallace, Clare Daly, Maureen O'Sullivan (who were all Teachta Dálas (TDs) at the time), and around 15 other people visited Ba'athist Syria for a week in June 2018 as an Irish delegation. It was funded by Connolly, using €3,691.72 of her Parliamentary Activities Allowance (PAP)—a taxpayer-funded allowance that is given to Independent TDs. The visit was approved by Ba'athist Syria's government, who issued the group visas.

The group flew to Beirut–Rafic Hariri International Airport and then flew to Damascus International Airport. They travelled from Damascus International to Yarmouk Camp, Syria's largest Palestinian refugee camp. At Yarmouk Camp, they met Saed Abd Al-Aal, the Free Palestine Movement (FPM)'s military commander. Photos of the group with Abd Al-Aal in Yarmouk were published to the Irish-Syria Solidarity Movement's social media account. They then travelled to Aleppo, where they visited the Aleppo Chamber of Industry and met with the Limerick born Sister Brigid Doody, who lives in Damascus. At the Chamber of Industry, they visited a convent and met with workers from UNICEF. They also met Syrian businessman and head of the chamber of commerce, Fares Shehabi. The Chamber of Industry posted images of the group with Shehabi on their social media.

On 13 October 2025, Connolly told RTÉ News at One that the trip was arranged by community activists including Dublin activist Rita Fagan. On an RTÉ candidates' debate two days later, she said the organiser was a private citizen who had previously organised trips to the West Bank in Palestine. Two days after the presidential vote, (Note: The presidential vote occurred on 24 October.) Wallace and Daly revealed that they and Daly's sister Elaine Daly—who previously organised trips to Palestine—were the ones to organise it.

== Aftermath ==
The notion that my visit to Syria to gain an understanding of a humanitarian crisis, that the EU had a hand in worsening, aligns me in any way with Assad’s government is not acceptable

— Catherine Connolly, speaking to The Irish Times.

A week after returning from Syria, Daly asked Dáil Éireann to grant Shehabi a visa to travel to Ireland and speak about what was happening in Syria, and that the group "went where we liked and talked to whom we liked". She also spoke about Russian intervention in the Syrian civil war, saying that many Syrians viewed the Russians as heroes. In interviews after her return, Connolly said that she funded the trip and that they were shown around by Palestinians; however, Palestinian and Syrian state media said that they were accompanied by Abdel Al-Aal.

In December 2018, Connolly asked then Tánaiste and Minister for Foreign Affairs, Simon Coveney, to assess the impact of EU sanctions against Syria, and provide it to the Oireachtas. He said that the sanctions were under constant review and that Ireland supported the EU's decision to sanction Syria. The Irish-Syria Solidarity Movement (ISSM) criticized the visit, saying it "provided legitimacy to the Assad regime and its narrative". Social media group Syria Irl said that Connolly had "consistently failed to admit the truth about her trip".

=== Impact on 2025 Irish presidential election ===
During Connolly's campaign in the 2025 Irish presidential election, the trip resurfaced as a point of controversy and scrutiny. At the start of her campaign in July 2025, she said that she had met no member of government, and that she self funded the trip. Throughout the presidential campaign, Connolly has consistently described it as a "fact-finding mission", to see the horrors of war firsthand, and reiterated that she "never, ever hesitated in [her] utter condemnation of Assad, publicly and privately". She told RTÉ Radio 1's Morning Ireland that she did not know who Abd Al-Aal was, saying, "I didn't know that, and you have no control when you go to a country like that as to who will come into your presence or not. That's no endorsement of the regime. I'm on record for condemning the regime" [sic].

The ISSM wrote an open letter saying that the visit legitimised and endorsed war criminals. They called for the Labour Party to not back Connolly's presidential bid because of the trip. In an email sent to the party's leader Ivana Bacik, they said that they did not think Connolly was a suitable Irish president, and that they would be "shock[ed] and deeply disappoint[ed]" if Labour backed her. Labour backed Connolly on 1 August. After Connolly won the election, an article by Shawn Pogatchnik in Politico said that she had been "accused of offering propaganda boosts for dictators from Russia to Syria", and that she had repeatedly "batted away" questions about the wisdom behind her taking the "one-sided tour of Syria".

== See also ==
- Irish political scandals
