= 2009 Galway City Council election =

Part of the 2009 Irish local elections

- 5 June 2009

15 seats on Galway City Council
	First party	Second party	Third party
Party	Labour	Fine Gael	Fianna Fáil
Seats won	5	3	3
Seat change	+1	-	+1
	Fourth party	Fifth party	Sixth party
Party	Independent	Green	Sinn Féin
Seats won	4	0	0
Seat change	+3	-1	-1
	Seventh party
Party	Progressive Democrats
Seats won	0
Seat change	-3
- Map showing the area of Galway City Council
Council control after election
TBD

An election to Galway City Council took place on 5 June 2009 as part of that year's Irish local elections. 15 councillors were elected from three local electoral areas (LEAs) for a five-year term of office on the electoral system of proportional representation by means of the single transferable vote (PR-STV).

== Results by party ==
Party	Seats	±	First Pref. votes	FPv%	±%
Labour	5	+1	4,347	19.11	
Fine Gael	3	-	4,848	21.31	
Fianna Fáil	3	+1	4,702	20.67	
Independent	4	+3	6,970	30.64	
Green	0	-1	1,194	5.25	
Sinn Féin	0	-1	690	3.03	
Progressive Democrats	0	-3	-	-	
Totals	15	-	22,751	100.00	—

== Results by local electoral area ==
=== Galway City Central ===
Galway City Central - 4 seats
Party	Candidate	FPv%	Count					
Party	Candidate	FPv%	1	2	3	4	5	6
Labour	Billy Cameron*	20.61	1,065					
Fine Gael	Padraig Conneely*	19.58	1,012	1,017	1,025	1,059		
Fianna Fáil	Ollie Crowe	15.03	777	779	783	787	814	903
Fianna Fáil	John Connolly*	11.59	599	601	609	623	680	754
Labour	Colette Connolly*	10.47	541	554	588	716	814	1,045
Independent	Mike Cubbard	9.17	474	477	493	514	626	
Independent	Mike Geraghty	6.48	335	338	350	384		
Green	Mairead Ni Chroinin	4.93	255	258	272			
Sinn Féin	Anna Marley	2.13	110	110				
Electorate: 11,284 Valid: 5,168 (45.80%) Spoilt: 73 Quota: 1,034 Turnout: 5,241 (46.45%)

=== Galway City East ===
Galway City East - 6 seats
Party	Candidate	FPv%	Count									
Party	Candidate	FPv%	1	2	3	4	5	6	7	8	9	10
Independent	Terry O'Flaherty*	12.95	1,139	1,141	1,160	1,174	1,204	1,242	1,311			
Independent	Declan McDonnell*	12.44	1,094	1,095	1,101	1,114	1,125	1,148	1,200	1,214	1,259	
Fianna Fáil	Michael Crowe*	11.88	1,045	1,046	1,080	1,082	1,092	1,119	1,156	1,161	1,234	1,270
Labour	Derek Nolan	11.31	995	999	1,013	1,082	1,160	1,208	1,283			
Fine Gael	Brian Walsh*	11.13	979	979	984	1,004	1,015	1,094	1,136	1,148	1,544	
Labour	Tom Costello*	8.83	777	778	801	823	867	927	1,001	1,012	1,069	1,203
Fianna Fáil	Mary Leahy*	8.62	758	760	781	785	797	813	832	838	901	930
Fine Gael	Barra Nevin	7.07	622	622	625	630	642	733	756	759		
Sinn Féin	Martin Concannon	4.65	409	411	412	418	431	452				
Fine Gael	Frank Fahy	4.50	396	397	407	411	423					
Green	James Hope	2.65	233	233	238	247						
Labour	Nuala Nolan	1.94	171	175	176							
Fianna Fáil	Sheila Mangan	1.76	155	155								
Independent	Thomas King	0.25	22									
Electorate: 18,149 Valid: 8,795 (48.46%) Spoilt: 117 Quota: 1,257 Turnout: 8,912 (49.10%)

=== Galway City West ===
Galway City West - 5 seats
Party	Candidate	FPv%	Count						
Party	Candidate	FPv%	1	2	3	4	5	6	7
Independent	Donal Lyons*	20.97	1,843						
Independent	Catherine Connolly*	13.43	1,180	1,220	1,272	1,347	1,480		
Fine Gael	Hildegarde Naughton	12.07	1,061	1,125	1,138	1,186	1,265	1,298	1,466
Fianna Fáil	Peter Keane	9.89	869	895	908	921	965	1,264	1,358
Labour	Niall McNelis	9.08	798	837	865	904	959	1,011	1,346
Fine Gael	John Mulholland*	8.85	778	843	861	884	962	1,043	1,167
Green	Niall O Brolchain*	8.03	706	755	781	853	923	985	
Fianna Fáil	Val Hanley	5.68	499	538	560	587	618		
Independent	A.J. Cahill	5.55	488	507	522	561			
Independent	Daniel Callanan*	3.86	339	364	394				
Sinn Féin	Tom Hanly	1.95	171	175					
Independent	Aidan McCabe	0.64	56	64					
Electorate: 16,731 Valid: 8,788 (52.53%) Spoilt: 89 Quota: 1,465 Turnout: 8,877 (53.06%)
