= Tokie =

Tokie may refer to:

- Tokie Kawase (born 1968), Japanese gymnast
- Tokie Laotan-Brown, Irish-Nigerian heritage architect, cultural economist and academic
- Tokie Slaughter (1919–1999), American clawhammer banjo player
