= Catherine Connolly =

President of Ireland since 2025

Her Excellency Catherine Connolly
- Official portrait, 2026

President of Ireland
- Incumbent
- Assumed office 11 November 2025
- Taoiseach: Micheál Martin
- Preceded by: Michael D. Higgins

Leas-Cheann Comhairle of Dáil Éireann
- In office 23 July 2020 – 8 November 2024
- Ceann Comhairle: Seán Ó Fearghaíl
- Preceded by: Pat "the Cope" Gallagher
- Succeeded by: John McGuinness

Chair of the Committee on the Irish Language, the Gaeltacht and the Islands
- In office 4 April 2016 – 15 September 2020
- Preceded by: Position established
- Succeeded by: Niamh Smyth

Teachta Dála
- In office February 2016 – 25 October 2025
- Constituency: Galway West

Mayor of Galway
- In office June 2004 – June 2005
- Preceded by: Terry O'Flaherty
- Succeeded by: Brian Walsh

Galway City Councillor
- In office June 1999 – March 2016
- Constituency: Galway City West

Personal details
- Born: Catherine Martina Ann Connolly; 5 November 1955 (age 71) Galway, Ireland
- Party: Independent (since 2006)
- Other political affiliations: Labour (until 2006)
- Spouse: Brian McEnery (m. 1992)
- Children: 2
- Education: University of Leeds; University College, Galway; King's Inns
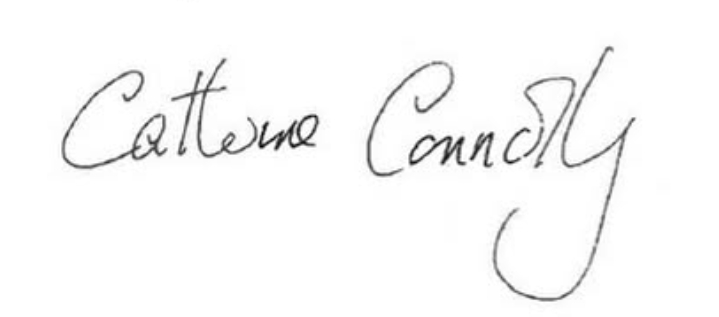
- Signature
- Website: Presidential campaign website

Catherine Martina Ann Connolly (born 5 November 1955) is an Irish politician serving as the president of Ireland since 11 November 2025. She had been a Teachta Dála (TD) for the Galway West constituency from 2016 until her election as president in 2025.

Born in Galway, Connolly began her political career as a member of the Labour Party, for which she was elected to Galway City Council in 1999, and was Mayor of Galway from 2004 to 2005. She left the party in 2006 in a dispute over candidate selection. After unsuccessfully contesting the 2007 and 2011 general elections in Galway West as an independent, Connolly was elected to the Dáil in 2016. She became Ireland's first female Leas-Cheann Comhairle, serving in the 33rd Dáil from July 2020 to November 2024. Connolly ran as an independent candidate in the 2025 presidential election, supported by Sinn Féin, the Social Democrats, the Labour Party, People Before Profit, the Green Party, 100% Redress, and several independent Oireachtas members. She defeated Heather Humphreys and Jim Gavin in a landslide victory, with her 914,143 first-preference votes being the largest first preference personal mandate in the history of the Republic of Ireland. She is the third woman to hold the office after Mary Robinson and Mary McAleese.

Ideologically described as left-wing to far-left, Connolly describes herself as a socialist and pacifist. A supporter of Irish neutrality, her foreign policy views were described by Politico as "often anti-Western"; she is critical of NATO, the European Union's increased military and defence spending and general European militarisation. Connolly has condemned the 2022 Russian invasion of Ukraine and has also described NATO's attitude toward Russia as "warmongering". An outspoken supporter of Palestine, Connolly is a staunch critic of Israel and has called it a "genocidal state". Connolly advocates for Irish reunification. Domestically, she supported the legalisation of same-sex marriage and the legalisation of abortion. Connolly is an Irish speaker and has previously worked as a clinical psychologist and as a barrister.

== Early life and education ==
Catherine Martina Ann Connolly was born on 5 November 1955 and grew up in Shantalla, Galway City, the ninth of 14 siblings (seven boys and seven girls). Her father was a carpenter and a boatbuilder, who built Galway hooker sailing boats. Her mother died at the age of 43, when Connolly was nine years old, her death suspected to have been caused by issues related to asthma. The family grew up in one of Galway's first social housing developments. In the 1970s, Connolly led a campaign to have tennis courts built in Shantalla.

Connolly has stated that she "learned her socialism" growing up through early volunteering. She participated in activities with the Legion of Mary, including house cleaning and hospital visits, and continued volunteering in later years with the Order of Malta. Connolly earned a bachelor's degree in psychology from the University College, Galway in the late 1970s and a master's degree in clinical psychology from the University of Leeds in 1981 before practising as a clinical psychologist for a number of years. Connolly subsequently earned a law degree from University College, Galway in 1989 before studying at King's Inns and becoming a barrister in 1991.

== Pre-presidential career ==
Connolly practised as a barrister, mostly on the Western Circuit, with a general practice, mainly in the areas of family law and personal injury law, from 1991 until she was elected to Dáil Éireann in 2016. Connolly joined the Labour Party after the 1997 general election. She was elected to Galway City Council for Labour in the west city area at the 1999 corporation election. For the 2004 council election, Connolly switched to the south city local electoral area to allow her sister, Colette, to contest the election in the west area of the city; both were elected. In the same year, she was elected Mayor of Galway, leading Labour into a power-sharing agreement with Fine Gael and independent councillors. As Mayor, Connolly successfully advocated for and presided over the awarding (in absentia) of the Freedom of Galway City to Myanmar political activist Aung San Suu Kyi in June 2005.

=== National politics (2004–present) ===
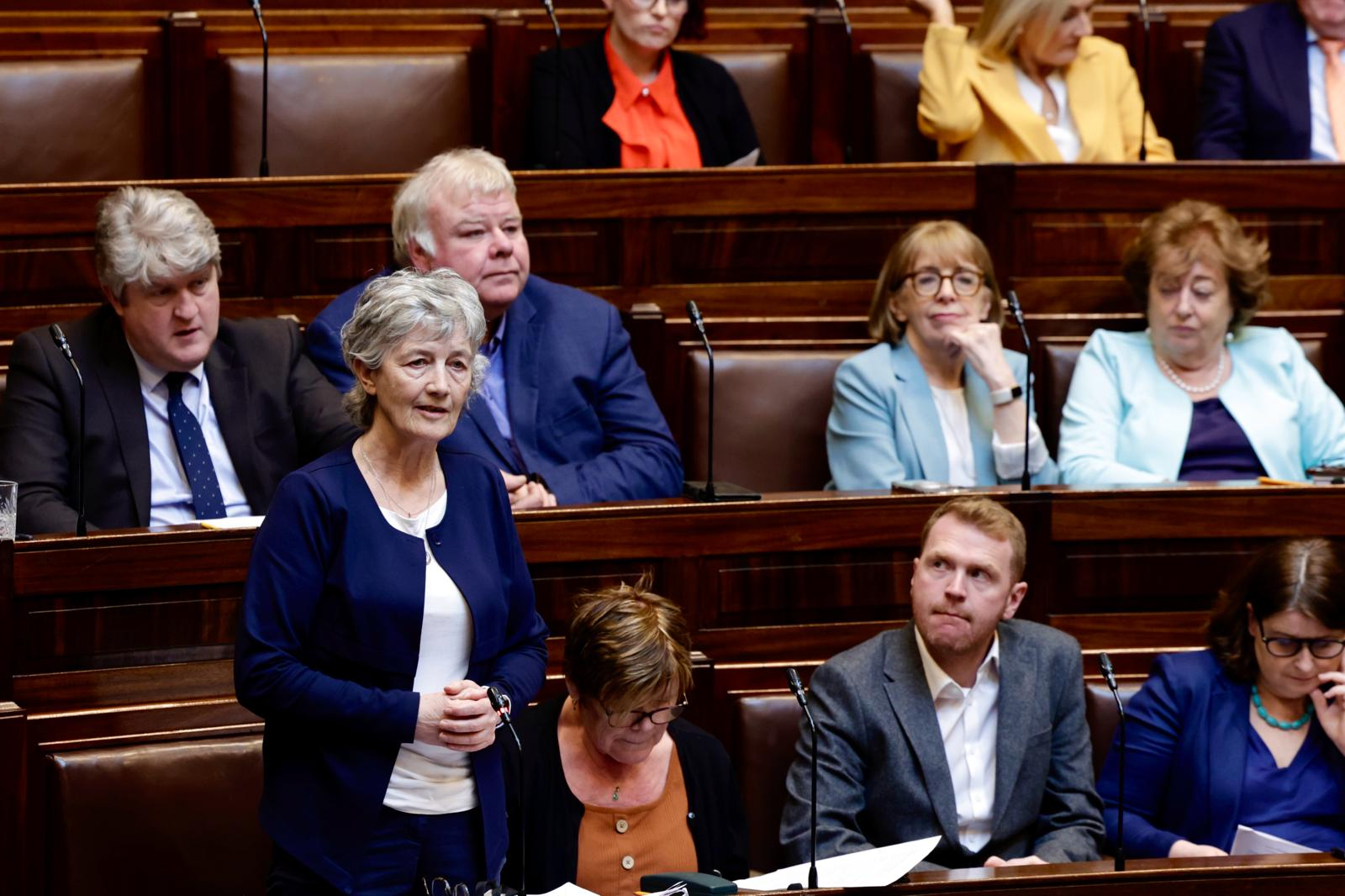
Connolly speaking in the Dáil in 2024

Connolly was a supporter of Michael D. Higgins's unsuccessful campaign to run in the 2004 presidential election; she later voted to nominate Dana Rosemary Scallon for that election. Connolly aimed to run in the 2007 general election as a running mate of Higgins in Galway West, but the party opted to only run one candidate in the constituency. Higgins had reportedly considered retiring due to health concerns, but he allowed his name to go forward to contest the seat again; Connolly criticised Higgins for "dragging his heels" on the decision, describing the decision to only run him as "crazy" and saying the party "lost out on a great opportunity". She left the Labour Party and unsuccessfully contested the 2007 general election as an independent candidate, polling just over 2,000 votes.

Connolly contested the 2011 general election again in Galway West, where she lost out on the last seat to Fine Gael's Seán Kyne by only 17 votes. She sought a full recount, which concluded after four days but did not change the outcome. Connolly was elected to Dáil Éireann for the Galway West constituency at the 2016 general election, when the Labour Party (of which she was formerly a member) lost 30 of its 37 seats, including its seat in Galway West, following an unpopular term in government. Her sister, Colette Connolly, who had lost her seat as a Labour councillor in 2014, was co-opted as an independent to replace Catherine on Galway City Council. Connolly voted for Richard Boyd Barrett for Taoiseach when the 32nd Dáil first met. At the 32nd Dáil's second meeting on 5 April 2016, she made her maiden speech in which she criticised the Minister for the Environment, Community and Local Government Alan Kelly's handling of Ireland's homelessness crisis. Connolly sat on the Public Accounts Committee and was Chair of the Committee on the Irish Language, the Gaeltacht and the Islands.

In 2018 Connolly joined Clare Daly, Mick Wallace, and Maureen O'Sullivan on a visit to Damascus, Maaloula, and Aleppo in Syria. When launching her 2025 presidential campaign she defended this trip, commenting that she funded the trip herself and that she did not "utter one word of support for Assad". However, Politico observed that Connolly also refrained from criticising Assad at that time and later called for the removal of sanctions on his regime. Connolly contested the 2020 general election and was re-elected on the 12th count.

=== Leas-Cheann Comhairle of Dáil Éireann (2020–2024) ===
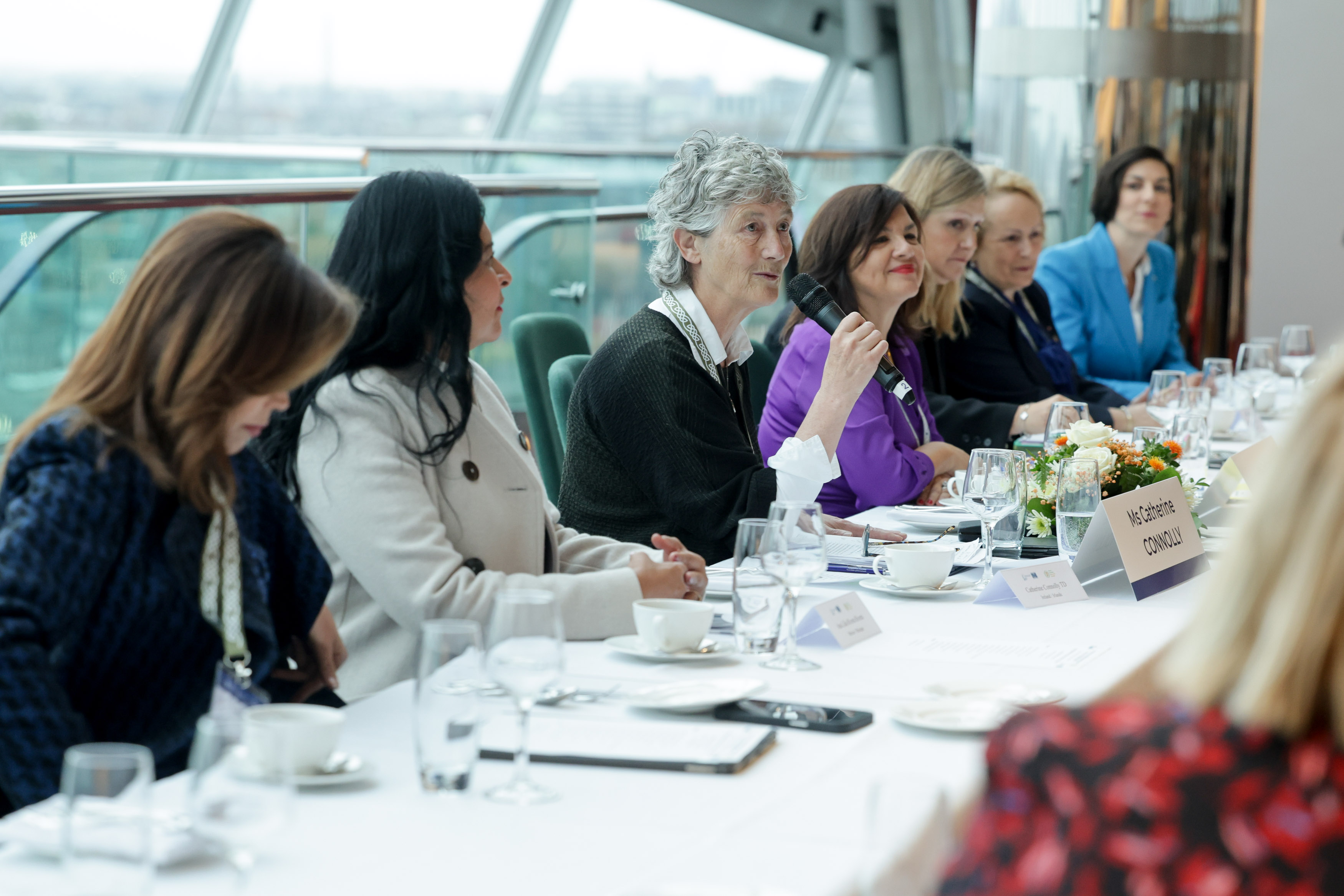
Connolly hosting the "Working breakfast of Women Presidents of Parliament" in Dublin, September 2023

Connolly was elected the Leas-Cheann Comhairle of Dáil Éireann on 23 July 2020, in a surprise victory over Fine Gael candidate Fergus O'Dowd, becoming the first woman to hold the position. In January 2021, Connolly criticised the Government for their handling of the Final Report of the Commission of Investigation (Mother and Baby Homes and certain related matters). Referring to the Taoiseach (Micheál Martin), Tánaiste (Leo Varadkar) and Minister for Children, Equality, Disability, Integration and Youth (Roderic O'Gorman) as the "three unwise men", she criticised the Government's failure to provide survivors of mother and baby homes the report before it was released to the general public. Connolly stated: "This document I have to hand is what the report looks like. I hold it up to show survivors because they do not have it. It is the executive summary with the recommendations and one or two other things. Not a single survivor has it. I have it since yesterday, when it was put in the pigeonholes of Deputies."

In June 2023 Connolly appeared alongside Clare Daly, Mick Wallace, Mairéad Farrell, and George Galloway in a "neutrality forum" hosted by the organisation "Galway Alliance Against War" where the topic for discussion was the Russo-Ukrainian War. In May 2024, during the campaign for the 2024 European Parliament election, Connolly endorsed Clare Daly in the Dublin constituency and spoke at her campaign launch.

=== 2025 presidential election and campaign ===
2025 Catherine Connolly presidential campaign
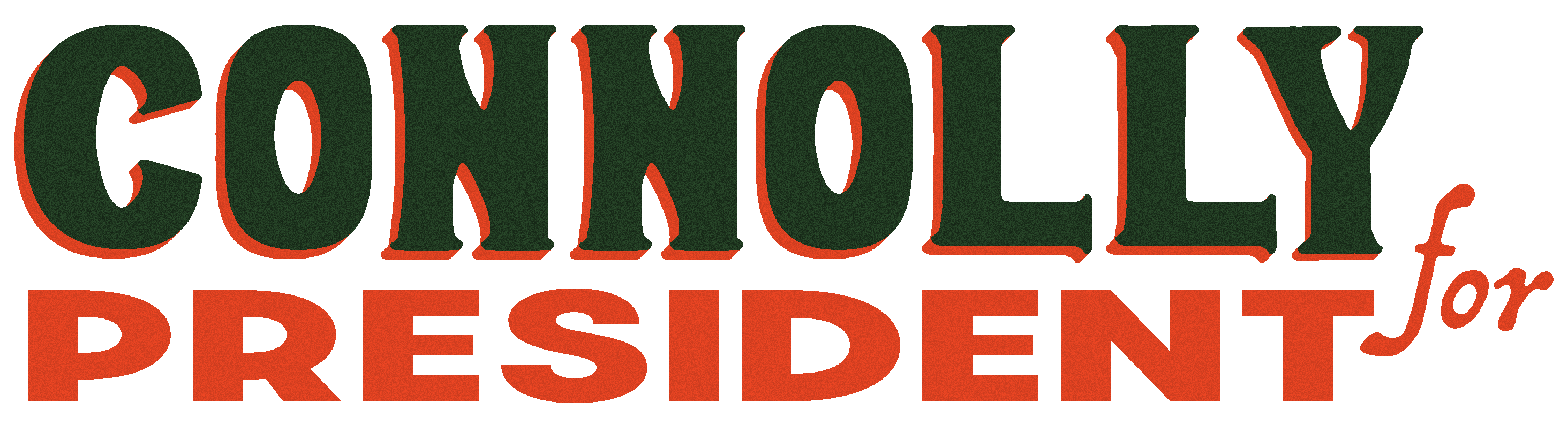
- Campaign: President of Ireland in the 2025 Irish presidential election
- Candidate: Catherine Connolly, TD for Galway West (2016–present)
- Affiliation: Independent (Note: Endorsed by Sinn Féin, Labour, Social Democrats, People Before Profit, Green Party, Solidarity, 100% Redress and several independent Oireachtas members.)
- Status: Announcement: 11 July 2025; First campaign launch: 16 July 2025; Second campaign launch: 22 September 2025; Election won: 25 October 2025; Inauguration: 11 November 2025
- Slogan: Connolly for President

Website
- catherineconnollyforpresident.ie

Connolly confirmed on 11 July 2025 on RTÉ Raidió na Gaeltachta that she had decided to run for president of Ireland and believed she had the necessary support. On 16 July, Connolly officially launched her campaign outside Leinster House and confirmed she had received the minimum of twenty Oireachtas nominations required to run for the office. Connolly emphasised giving a voice to ordinary people and tackling issues such as a United Ireland, climate change, homelessness, and the normalisation of violence. She signalled interest in scrutinising the €330,000 presidential salary, stating she would "look at it" and consider using it "for the common good" if elected.

In the election on 24 October 2025, Connolly won receiving 63.4% of the votes cast, the highest percentage any president has received since the creation of the role in 1938, in what was widely described as a landslide victory. With 914,143 votes, she recorded the highest number of first preference votes ever received by a candidate in Ireland.

==== Endorsements ====
Connolly's campaign was backed by the Social Democrats, People Before Profit, 100% Redress, and a number of independent Oireachtas members. On 31 July, Connolly secured the backing of the Labour Party. On 27 August, Labour TD Alan Kelly said he would not support Connolly due to concerns about her policies on international relations. On 4 September, Solidarity TD Ruth Coppinger backed Connolly and on 19 September the Green Party announced it would endorse Connolly's candidacy.

On 20 September, Sinn Féin announced its backing for Connolly's campaign. Connolly was also backed by both the Workers' Party and the Communist Party of Ireland, neither of which has any elected representatives. Holly Cairns (Social Democrats), Marie Sherlock (Labour), independent senator Eileen Flynn, Roderic O'Gorman (Green Party), Paul Murphy (People Before Profit), and Mary Lou McDonald (Sinn Féin) all spoke at Connolly's campaign launch on 22 September endorsing her candidacy.

==== Campaign trail ====
Connolly made a commitment to visit every County in the Republic of Ireland during her campaign. By 24 October, she had visited: Wicklow on 7 August, Louth on 30 August, Sligo on 5 September, Leitrim on 6 September, Donegal on 12 and 27 September, Carlow on 22 September, Cork on 3 October, Dublin on 5 October, Tipperary on 10 October, Waterford and Wexford on 11 October, Kildare on 14 October, Meath on 15 October, Kerry on 17 October, Clare and Limerick on 19 October, Cavan, Monaghan, Longford and Westmeath on 22 October, and Roscommon on 23 October.

Connolly attended several agricultural shows in August: the Bonniconlon Show in County Mayo, the Ballyshannon Show in County Donegal, and the Tullamore Show in County Offaly. She came back to Offaly on a higher-profile visit for the National Ploughing Championships in Screggan on 17 September 2025, where she was interviewed about rural and agricultural life in Ireland and her presidential candidacy. Connolly visited Belfast on 28 August 2025; she said that citizens of Northern Ireland should be permitted to vote in the presidential election, and the North was a "limb" cut off from the Republic of Ireland.

==== Nomination of Gemma O'Doherty in 2018 ====
At her campaign launch, Connolly was questioned about her nominating Gemma O'Doherty for the 2018 Irish presidential election. Connolly was one of eleven Oireachtas members who did so. Connolly said that she "doesn't regret her decision to sign O'Doherty's papers at the time", adding that she "did not know her personally but saw her as a journalist who had done some very good work in the past". In September 2025, Connolly stated she would not have nominated O'Doherty if it had been a few years later.

==== Visit to Syria ====
During Connolly's campaign, she faced scrutiny for a visit she made to Ba'athist Syria in 2018, along with Mick Wallace (then a Member of the European Parliament), Clare Daly (also an MEP) and Maureen O'Sullivan (then a TD). Members of the Irish-Syria Solidarity Movement asked the Labour Party not to support Connolly's campaign, arguing that the trip had "provided legitimacy to the Assad regime and its narrative". Connolly said the trip was a "fact-finding mission" to see the harm that EU sanctions were causing to Syrian civilians. She visited a refugee camp in Damascus and travelled to Aleppo to meet the Chamber of Commerce and UNICEF. Connolly said she did not support the Assad regime: "On no occasion had I anything to do with the government, nor did I ever utter one word of support for Assad". She added: "Assad's dictatorship committed countless atrocities and human rights abuses, all of which I have criticised".

In a piece for The Journal during her campaign, Shane Raymond noted that "the Irish tour group was shown around Aleppo by the pro-Assad commentator Fares Al-Shehabi, who ... had been put under sanctions by the EU for supporting the Assad regime". The year before, he had called for the rape and murder of anti-Assad Syrians and journalists. Connolly replied that meeting Al-Shehabi was a "mistake". She said she "had absolutely no respect for that man after listening to him" during the trip, and "In retrospect, when one looks back and sees the comments that he made ... this man is utterly unacceptable to me". She also met Saed Abd Al-Aal, a commander of the pro-Assad Free Palestine Movement militia, a group which human rights monitors have implicated "in atrocities and starvation siege tactics against Palestinian refugees". When her meeting with Saed Abd Al-Aal was pointed out, Connolly claimed that "[...] you have no control when you go to a country like that as to who will come into your presence or not. That's no endorsement of the [Assad] regime".

==== Appointment of parliamentary assistant ====
On 1 October 2025, theJournal.ie published the story that, in 2018, Connolly sought to hire Ursula Ní Shionnain, a former Éirígí member who had served almost four and a half years of a six-year prison sentence for firearms offences, as an administrative support in Leinster House. Ní Shionnain had been convicted by the Special Criminal Court in 2014 after being arrested in a stolen van carrying weapons, one of which had previously been used in a murder, though there was no suggestion she was linked to that crime. Ní Shionnain, who holds degrees in early and modern Irish and in language planning, had been working on a PhD in new Irish language communities at the time of her arrest. Connolly said she assessed Ní Shionnain's suitability through recommendations from prison visiting committees and politicians familiar with her background, and that she understood Ní Shionnain had rehabilitated herself and was no longer active in Éirígí. Ní Shionnain's hiring was intended to support Connolly's work on the Oireachtas committee for the Irish language. Garda vetting was required for employment in Leinster House, but Connolly stated that the process was not completed during Ní Shionnain's six-month tenure, which ended when she left of her own accord.

The hiring drew criticism from senior political figures, including Taoiseach Micheál Martin and Fine Gael's presidential candidate Heather Humphreys, who raised concerns about parliamentary security and the judgment of employing a former prisoner with past dissident republican affiliations. Connolly and others, including former Fianna Fáil minister Éamon Ó Cuív and Sinn Féin leader Mary Lou McDonald, defended the decision as an example of rehabilitation, noting Ní Shionnain's further education and professional work since release, with Ó Cuív stating he had in fact recommended the appointment to Connolly. Connolly also expressed concern about the public disclosure of Ní Shionnain's identity, describing it as damaging to her privacy and questioning how and why the information was released.

== President of Ireland (2025–present) ==
=== Inauguration ===
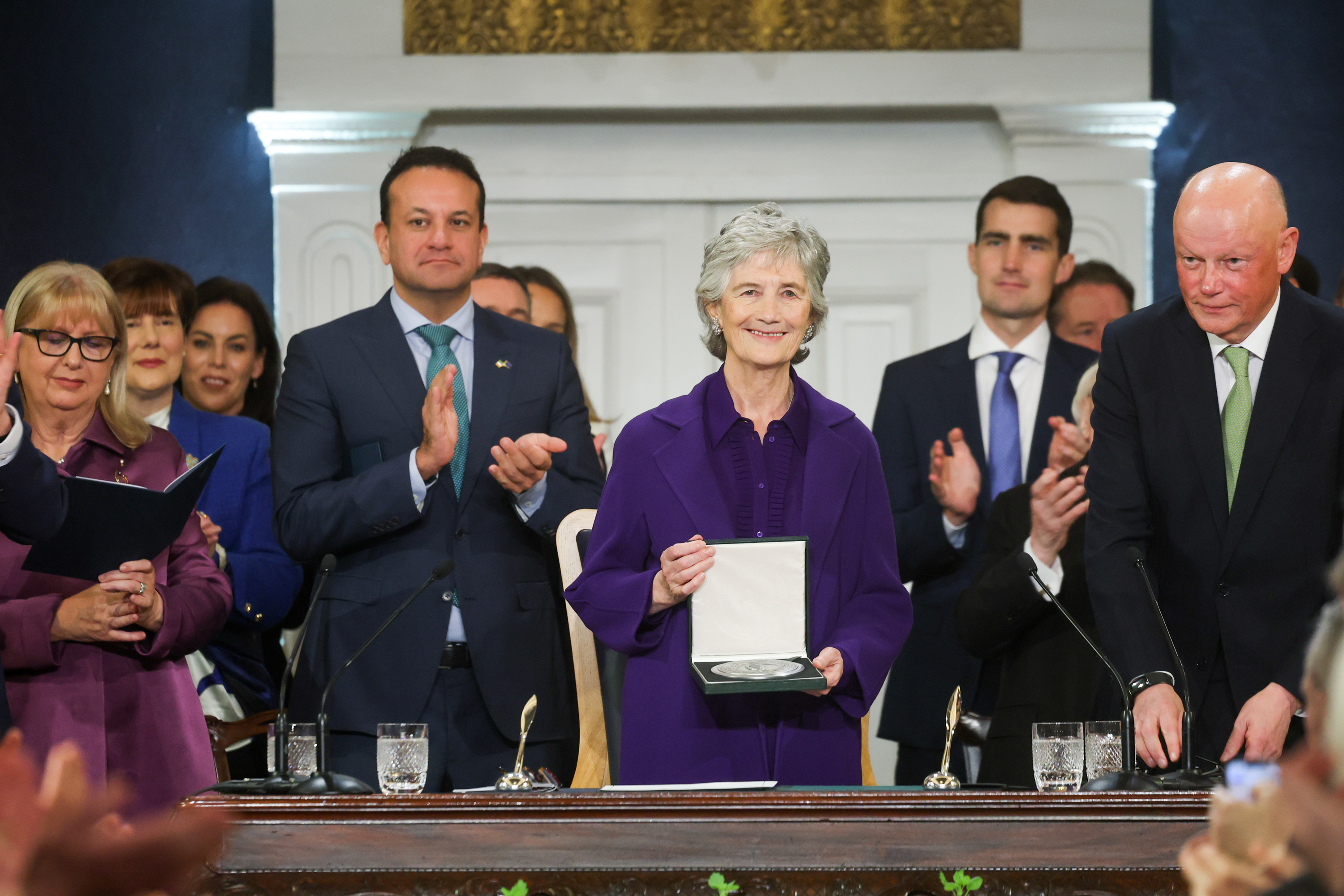
Connolly at her inauguration as president on 11 November 2025

Connolly meets with First Minister of Scotland, John Swinney at Bute House in Edinburgh, September 2026

Connolly was elected president of Ireland on 24 October 2025, winning 63.4% of valid first-preference votes, becoming the third woman to hold the office. Her nearest rival, Heather Humphreys, finished on 29% (424,987). Connolly's 914,143 votes is the highest number of first-preference votes ever received by an electoral candidate in Ireland. On 11 November 2025, she was inaugurated as president of Ireland in St. Patrick's Hall, Dublin Castle, in a ceremony attended by Taoiseach Micheál Martin, and former presidents Michael D. Higgins, Mary McAleese and Mary Robinson, as well as representatives of all political parties. In her inauguration speech she promised to focus on "peace, neutrality and climate change" during her term. A new republic, a united Ireland, and the importance of the Irish language were key themes in her speech, saying that it will be the working language in Áras an Uachtaráin.

=== Tenure ===
Connolly visited Gaelscoil Inse Chór, Inchicore for her first official presidential engagement on 12 November. On 12 June 2026, Connolly was conferred with the Freedom of Galway City in recognition of her decades of public service.

==== Foreign policy ====
On 2 December, she received President of Ukraine Volodymyr Zelenskyy and First Lady Olena Zelenska at Áras an Uachtaráin on a courtesy call. Connolly received Swedish climate activist Greta Thunberg on 17 December. She made her first official presidential visit to the United Kingdom from 18 to 20 May 2026, inviting King Charles to Ireland for a state visit the following year. In September 2026, she engaged in a four day visit to Scotland, where she met with First Minister John Swinney at Bute House in Edinburgh, before visiting Glasgow, Coatbridge and the Isle of Skye. On her visit to Scotland, Connolly said "Ireland and Scotland are bound by strong ties of friendship, culture and language, with people moving between our countries for centuries".

== Political views ==
Connolly is characterised in the press as a left-wing, or far-left, independent politician on the Irish political spectrum. In May 2025, The Phoenix magazine described her as a "long-time socialist" who had been regarded as "left-wing" and an "Irish republican" during her time in Labour, although Connolly clarified in September 2025 that she never supported the Provisional IRA during The Troubles and feels that "violence was never justified" during that time period. Connolly identifies as a pacifist. Clare Daly and Mick Wallace (both former TDs and MEPs) are political allies of Connolly, with Connolly endorsing Daly in her 2024 European re-election campaign; in a 2025 interview with Hot Press, Connolly said she had "the greatest of respect" for Wallace and Daly.

=== Domestic affairs ===
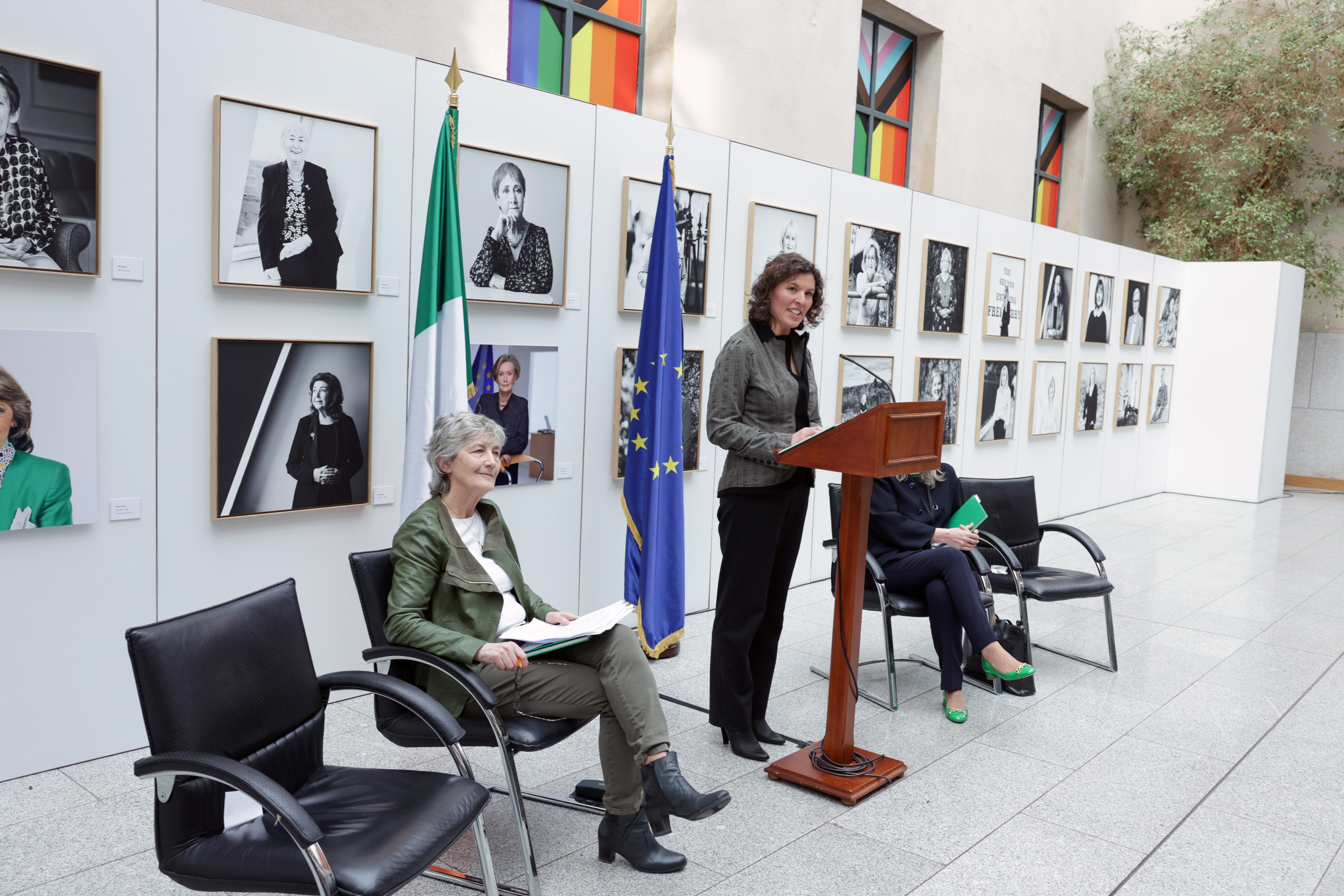
Connolly at the exhibition "Irish Female MEPs Past and Present" to mark International Women's Day 2024

Connolly supported the 2013 referendum on Irish court reform, saying the passing of the referendum "renewed her faith in democracy". She supported Ireland's 2015 referendum on same-sex marriage. In 2018, Connolly supported the repeal of the eighth amendment which allowed the Oireachtas to legislate for abortion, supporting the legalisation of abortion up to 12 weeks.

In 2025, Connolly stated "Our Defence Forces exist to protect our people, our sovereignty, and ... to foster peace where conflict has broken out". She added: "Ireland needs our Defence Forces. We must value, respect, and support their members. But Ireland does not need an army", arguing that "armies fight wars" and are "at odds with a nation's neutrality".

Connolly believes that drug use and addiction should be treated primarily as health issues rather than criminal offences. She has expressed support for moves toward drug decriminalisation, highlighting the work of politicians such as Gino Kenny in advancing this cause. In her view, criminalisation fails to address the root causes of addiction and instead punishes vulnerable people. Connolly has described euthanasia as a complex issue, but stated that she accepts the principle of individual autonomy in end-of-life decisions. She supports allowing people to make such choices provided there are robust safeguards to prevent abuse.

=== Foreign affairs ===
Connolly with US President Donald Trump in Dublin, 2026

In 2025, Politico characterised Connolly's foreign policy views as pro-neutrality, "often anti-Western", and anti-NATO, while also highlighting her "trenchant" criticism of Israel.

==== European Union and militarism ====
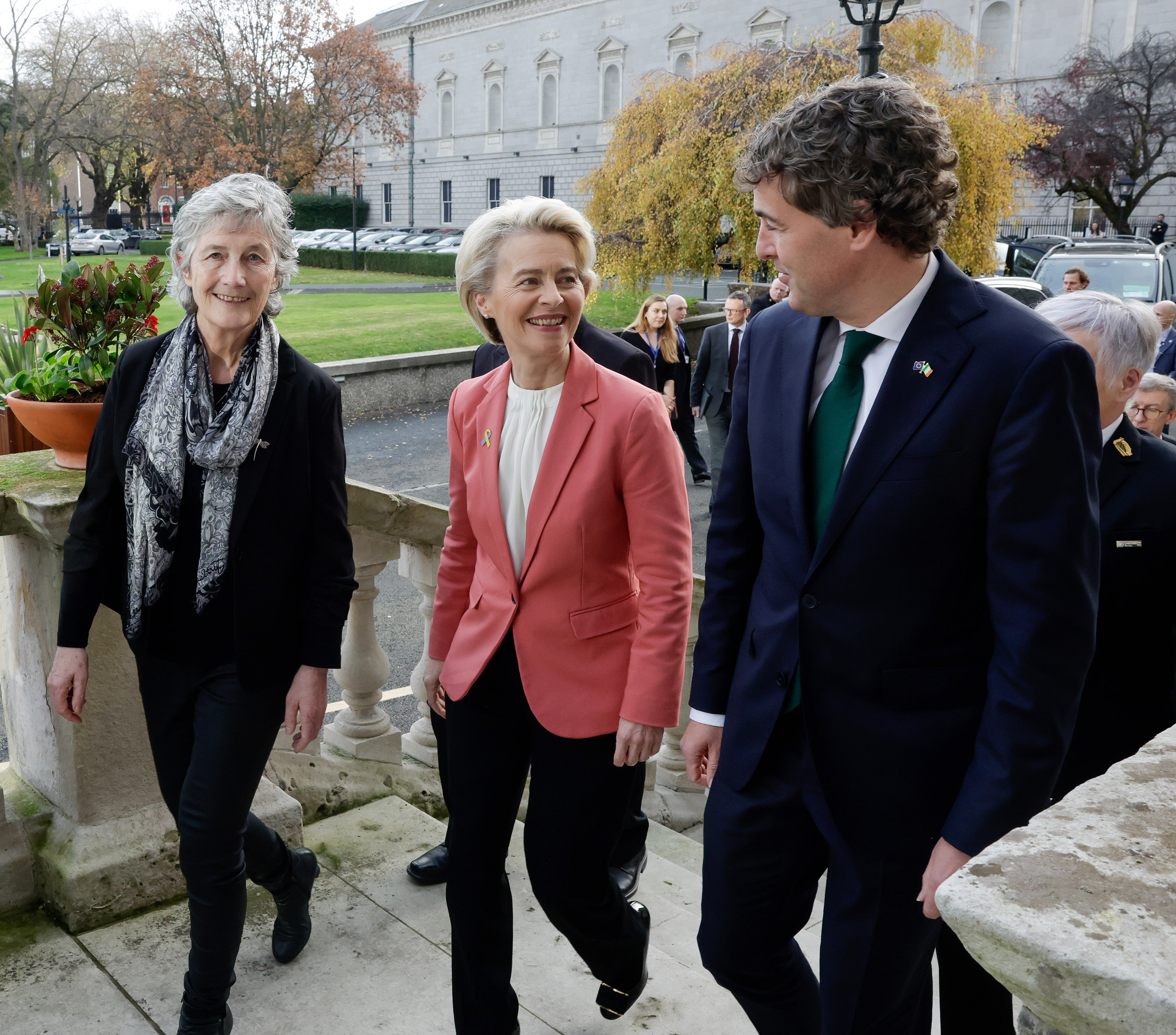
Connolly (left) with President of the European Commission, Ursula von der Leyen, during her visit to Ireland, December 2022

Connolly has expressed concerns about Irish neutrality being challenged; she said that Ireland's peace is threatened by what she called "the war-mongering military industrial complex" in Europe. In 2025, Connolly remarked that "we certainly cannot trust" countries such as "The US, England and France" because they "are deeply entrenched in an arms industry which causes bloodshed across the world". That September, Connolly linked Germany's increased military spending to the "military-industrial complex" and said there were "some parallels with the ’30s", referring to German rearmament under the Nazis. Some academics responded that the two were "fundamentally different". They said that Nazi re-armament was for expansionism while modern Germany's spending increase was for deterrence and defence. Germany's ambassador to Ireland, David Gill, and Taoiseach Micheál Martin criticised Connolly in response.

Connolly has criticised the European Union as having a "blatant neoliberal agenda". She opposed the ratification of the Treaty of Nice in the 2002 referendum, and the ratification of the Treaty of Lisbon in both referendums. Regarding the 2016 United Kingdom European Union membership referendum, in a speech in the Dáil shortly after the UK voted to leave the EU, Connolly said the Irish government "took an active part in the project of fear that sought to scare the British electorate into remaining" and that despite trying "to force a desired result, the electorate was not fooled". Connolly also stated during the speech that there is a "democratic deficit that is an integral part of the EU" and she felt that "dissent is not tolerated" with regards to EU membership.

Connolly said that "The EU has become increasingly militarised under the leadership of Ursula von der Leyen and the European People's Party", and "has lost sight of its foundations: a project developed to promote and preserve peace". Connolly considers von der Leyen's differing positions of Israel and Russia as hypocritical, saying von der Leyen strongly opposed Russia's actions in Ukraine and was passive over Israel's actions in Gaza. On Europe Day 2025, Connolly declared that she was "ashamed to be European" because she believed the current EU leadership was pro-Israel. After launching her presidential bid later that year, Connolly said she does not consider herself a Eurosceptic and called herself a "committed European".

==== International conflict ====
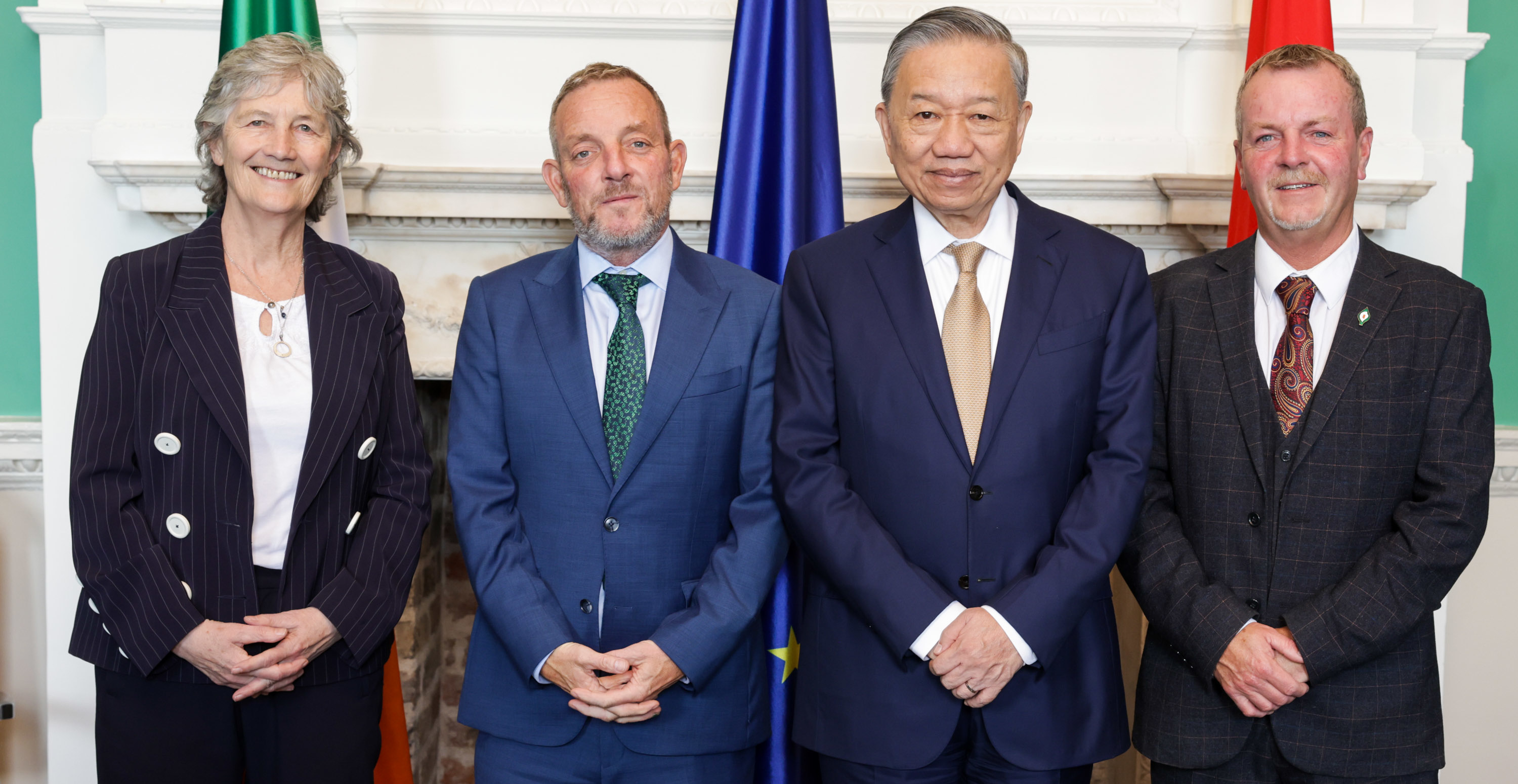
Connolly (first from left), Jerry Buttimer (second from left) and Pat Buckley (fourth from left) meeting President of Vietnam Tô Lâm (third from left) in October 2024

A vocal critic of Israel and its war in Gaza, Connolly has called for solidarity with the Palestinian people; in April 2025, she said in the Dáil "I challenge all of us to stand up and stop the genocide taking place in our name, because we are complicit", while in July of the same year, she called Israel a "genocidal state". Connolly said the Irish government had been "dragging their feet" in imposing its planned sanctions against Israel, urging it not to water down the sanctions under pressure from US corporate interests.

Connolly has condemned both Russia and NATO over the Russian invasion of Ukraine. She called the invasion "illegal and unacceptable" and said Russia "must immediately end its horrific assault". Highlighting Russian opposition to NATO enlargement, she said that "NATO has played a despicable role in moving forward to the border and engaging in warmongering. Ireland has been hypocritical on many levels". She has called for continued solidarity with the Ukrainian people and supports sanctions against Russia but would like to see a “discussion on sanctions generally and whether they’re effective or not effective”.

While Mayor of Galway from 2004 to 2005, Connolly spoke in opposition to the Iraq War. In 2017, she opposed sanctions against Ba'athist Syria during the Syrian civil war, stating that such sanctions were untargeted and only made the situation worse for Syrians. As part of a group including Mick Wallace, Clare Daly and Maureen O'Sullivan, Connolly visited Syria in 2018. They toured regime-controlled territory and met members of a pro-regime militia but did not meet members of the government; according to Connolly "there was no praise for the regime in the company we were in".

== Further Information ==
In September 2026, Connolly visited the "Working Over By:Donegal Emigrant Working Lives in Scotland 1940-1990" exhibition in Glasgow. At a reception on the same day, she described the visit, which had featured input from relatives of the people depicted, as an "emotional experience" . She also commented "It’s not going over to live, it’s working over [by], but so many never came back." One of those she met was former Celtic and Republic of Ireland goalkeeper Packie Bonner

== Personal life ==
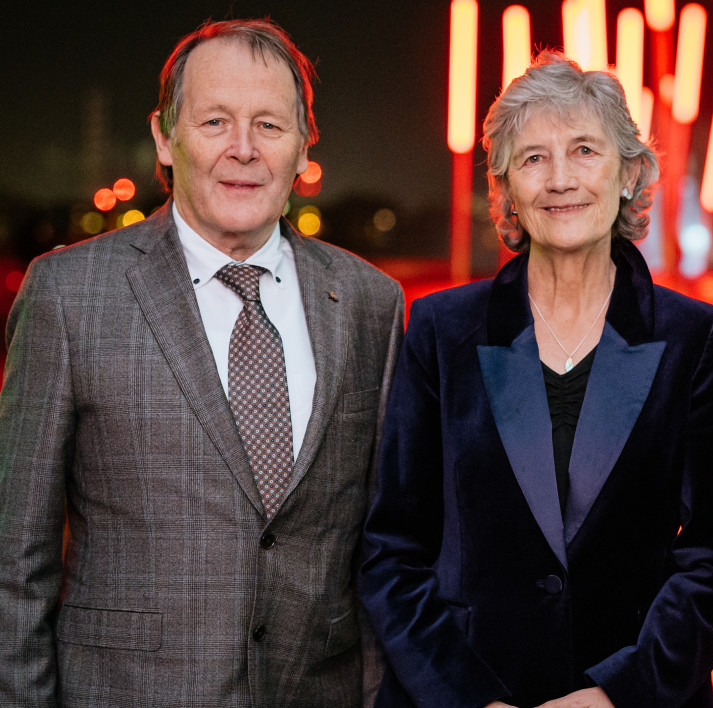
Connolly and her husband Brian McEnery in December 2025

Connolly has lived in the Claddagh in Galway since 1988. She married woodwork teacher Brian McEnery in 1992 and they have two adult sons. She has worked as clinical psychologist with the Western Health Board in Ballinasloe and Connemara in County Galway, and as a barrister. She is an Irish speaker, having done a diploma in Irish at university and also speaks German, having studied psychology in Germany. She was raised Catholic, but has described herself as irreligious.

Connolly has completed both marathons and triathlons, revealing in the podcast How to Gael that she has lost count of how many marathons she has finished. She also recounted that she was five months pregnant when completing the Streets of Galway race in 1995. Sligo-based socialist politician Declan Bree is Connolly's brother-in-law. Connolly has two pet cats.

== Electoral results ==
Elections to Galway City Council
Party	Election		FPv	FPv%	Result
Labour	No. 2 LEA	1999	457	11.1	Elected on count 7/8
Labour	No. 3 LEA	2004	1,265	15.7	Elected on count 7/9
Independent	City West LEA	2009	1,180	13.4	Elected on count 5/7
Independent	City West LEA	2014	1,513	17.6	Elected on count 1/7

Elections to the Dáil
Party	Election		FPv	FPv%	Result
Independent	Galway West	2007	2,006	3.7	Eliminated on count 8/13
Independent	Galway West	2011	4,766	7.9	Eliminated on count 13/13
Independent	Galway West	2016	4,877	7.6	Elected on count 14/14
Independent	Galway West	2020	5,439	9.0	Elected on count 12/13
Independent	Galway West	2024	6,747	11.2	Elected on count 11/16

Irish presidential elections
Party	Election	FPv	FPv%	Result
Independent	2025	914,143	63.4	Elected

== See also ==
- List of Irish-speaking people

== Notes ==
Civic offices
Preceded by Terry O'Flaherty	Mayor of Galway; 2004–2005	Succeeded by Brian Walsh
Political offices
Preceded by Michael D. Higgins	President of Ireland; 2025–present	Incumbent

Dáil	Election	Deputy (Party)	Deputy (Party)	Deputy (Party)	Deputy (Party)	Deputy (Party)
9th	1937	Gerald Bartley (FF)	Joseph Mongan (FG)	Seán Tubridy (FF)	3 seats 1937–1977	
10th	1938	Gerald Bartley (FF)	Joseph Mongan (FG)	Seán Tubridy (FF)	3 seats 1937–1977	
10th	1940 by-election	Gerald Bartley (FF)	Joseph Mongan (FG)	John J. Keane (FF)	3 seats 1937–1977	
11th	1943	Gerald Bartley (FF)	Joseph Mongan (FG)	Eamon Corbett (FF)	3 seats 1937–1977	
12th	1944	Gerald Bartley (FF)	Joseph Mongan (FG)	Michael Lydon (FF)	3 seats 1937–1977	
13th	1948	Gerald Bartley (FF)	Joseph Mongan (FG)	Michael Lydon (FF)	3 seats 1937–1977	
14th	1951	Gerald Bartley (FF)	John Mannion Snr (FG)	Peadar Duignan (FF)	3 seats 1937–1977	
15th	1954	Gerald Bartley (FF)	Fintan Coogan Snr (FG)	Johnny Geoghegan (FF)	3 seats 1937–1977	
16th	1957	Gerald Bartley (FF)	Fintan Coogan Snr (FG)	Johnny Geoghegan (FF)	3 seats 1937–1977	
17th	1961	Gerald Bartley (FF)	Fintan Coogan Snr (FG)	Johnny Geoghegan (FF)	3 seats 1937–1977	
18th	1965	Bobby Molloy (FF)	Fintan Coogan Snr (FG)	Johnny Geoghegan (FF)	3 seats 1937–1977	
19th	1969	Bobby Molloy (FF)	Fintan Coogan Snr (FG)	Johnny Geoghegan (FF)	3 seats 1937–1977	
20th	1973	Bobby Molloy (FF)	Fintan Coogan Snr (FG)	Johnny Geoghegan (FF)	3 seats 1937–1977	
20th	1975 by-election	Bobby Molloy (FF)	Fintan Coogan Snr (FG)	Máire Geoghegan-Quinn (FF)	3 seats 1937–1977	
21st	1977	Bobby Molloy (FF)	John Mannion Jnr (FG)	Máire Geoghegan-Quinn (FF)	Bill Loughnane (FF)	4 seats 1977–1981
22nd	1981	Bobby Molloy (FF)	John Donnellan (FG)	Máire Geoghegan-Quinn (FF)	Mark Killilea Jnr (FF)	Michael D. Higgins (Lab)
23rd	1982 (Feb)	Bobby Molloy (FF)	John Donnellan (FG)	Máire Geoghegan-Quinn (FF)	Frank Fahey (FF)	Michael D. Higgins (Lab)
24th	1982 (Nov)	Bobby Molloy (FF)	John Donnellan (FG)	Máire Geoghegan-Quinn (FF)	Frank Fahey (FF)	Fintan Coogan Jnr (FG)
25th	1987	Bobby Molloy (PDs)	John Donnellan (FG)	Máire Geoghegan-Quinn (FF)	Frank Fahey (FF)	Michael D. Higgins (Lab)
26th	1989	Bobby Molloy (PDs)	Pádraic McCormack (FG)	Máire Geoghegan-Quinn (FF)	Frank Fahey (FF)	Michael D. Higgins (Lab)
27th	1992	Bobby Molloy (PDs)	Pádraic McCormack (FG)	Máire Geoghegan-Quinn (FF)	Éamon Ó Cuív (FF)	Michael D. Higgins (Lab)
28th	1997	Bobby Molloy (PDs)	Pádraic McCormack (FG)	Frank Fahey (FF)	Éamon Ó Cuív (FF)	Michael D. Higgins (Lab)
29th	2002	Noel Grealish (PDs)	Pádraic McCormack (FG)	Frank Fahey (FF)	Éamon Ó Cuív (FF)	Michael D. Higgins (Lab)
30th	2007	Noel Grealish (PDs)	Pádraic McCormack (FG)	Frank Fahey (FF)	Éamon Ó Cuív (FF)	Michael D. Higgins (Lab)
31st	2011	Noel Grealish (Ind.)	Brian Walsh (FG)	Seán Kyne (FG)	Éamon Ó Cuív (FF)	Derek Nolan (Lab)
32nd	2016	Noel Grealish (Ind.)	Hildegarde Naughton (FG)	Seán Kyne (FG)	Éamon Ó Cuív (FF)	Catherine Connolly (Ind.)
33rd	2020	Noel Grealish (Ind.)	Hildegarde Naughton (FG)	Mairéad Farrell (SF)	Éamon Ó Cuív (FF)	Catherine Connolly (Ind.)
34th	2024	Noel Grealish (Ind.)	Hildegarde Naughton (FG)	Mairéad Farrell (SF)	John Connolly (FF)	Catherine Connolly (Ind.)
34th	2026 by-election	Noel Grealish (Ind.)	Hildegarde Naughton (FG)	Mairéad Farrell (SF)	John Connolly (FF)	Seán Kyne (FG)
