= 1999 Galway Corporation election =

Part of the 1999 Irish local elections

- 10 June 1999

All 15 seats to Galway City Council
	First party	Second party	Third party
Party	Fianna Fáil	Progressive Democrats	Fine Gael
Seats won	5	4	4
Seat change	+1	-	-
	Fourth party	Fifth party
Party	Labour	Independent
Seats won	2	0
Seat change	-	-1
- Map showing the area of Galway City Council
Council control after election
TBD

An election to Galway City Council took place on 10 June 1999 as part of that year's Irish local elections. 15 councillors were elected from three local electoral areas on the system of proportional representation by means of the single transferable vote (PR-STV) for a five-year term of office.

== Results by party ==
Party	Seats	±	First Pref. votes	FPv%	±%
Fianna Fáil	5	+1	5,156	30.10	
Progressive Democrats	4	-	3,753	21.91	
Fine Gael	4	-	3,181	18.57	
Labour	2	-	2,082	12.16	
Independent	0	-1	2,247	13.12	
Totals	15	-	16,419	100.00	—

== Results by local electoral area ==
=== Galway No.1 ===
Galway No.1 - 7 seats
Party	Candidate	FPv%	Count												
Party	Candidate	FPv%	1	2	3	4	5	6	7	8	9	10	11	12	13
Fine Gael	Pádraic McCormack TD*	12.30	934	944	960										
Fianna Fáil	Michael Leahy*	11.65	884	901	907	909	994								
Progressive Democrats	Declan McDonnell*	11.00	835	843	849	850	860	882	884	898	933	979			
Labour	Tom Costello*	8.40	638	655	773	775	788	818	819	872	935	1,029			
Progressive Democrats	Terry O'Flaherty	7.18	545	560	570	571	593	632	636	657	711	757	771	782	968
Fianna Fáil	Val Hanley	6.82	518	527	528	528	555	574	594	610	637	716	726	733	805
Progressive Democrats	Gary Creaven	6.24	474	480	488	488	496	511	513	547	562	591	597	603	
Fianna Fáil	Johanna Downes	5.61	426	429	437	438	456	469	483	565	592	614	625	627	677
Fine Gael	Senator Fintan Coogan*	4.56	346	358	364	365	384	458	459	498	546	596	604	605	751
Independent	Jimmy Cahill	5.15	391	414	423	424	428	440	440	463	526				
Independent	Peter Rowland	4.51	342	354	361	361	362	370	370						
Independent	Damien Carrick	4.43	336	352	361	362	365	385	386	418					
Fine Gael	Niall McNelis	3.74	284	295	303	304	313								
Fianna Fáil	Henry O'Connor*	3.00	228	232	235	235									
Labour	Kieran Duffy	2.91	221	229											
Independent	Desmond O'Dowd	1.84	140												
Natural Law	Paul Campbell	0.65	49												
Electorate: 17,822 Valid: 7,591 (42.59%) Spoilt: 116 Quota: 949 Turnout: 7,707 (43.24%)

=== Galway No.2 ===
Galway No.2 - 4 seats
Party	Candidate	FPv%	Count							
Party	Candidate	FPv%	1	2	3	4	5	6	7	8
Fianna Fáil	Michéal Ó hUiginn*	15.81	649	659	679	712	737	789	820	826
Fianna Fáil	Martin Quinn	14.86	610	625	637	663	682	700	721	733
Fine Gael	Angela Lupton*	14.33	588	601	607	643	668	694	746	772
Labour	Catherine Connolly	11.14	457	486	502	524	678	758	924	
Independent	Paddy Lally*	9.48	389	419	440	463	494	570	653	712
Green	Pat Fitzpatrick	7.12	292	322	352	375	384	428		
Independent	Mike Egan	6.75	277	294	324	350	373			
Labour	Joe Naughton	6.46	265	275	286	302				
Progressive Democrats	Antoinette Flynn	5.24	215	225	232					
Sinn Féin	Vincent Forde	4.51	185	190						
Independent	Aidan Berry	4.31	177							
Electorate: 9,668 Valid: 4,104 (42.45%) Spoilt: 65 Quota: 821 Turnout: 4,169 (43.12%)

=== Galway No.3 ===
Galway No.3 - 4 seats
Party	Candidate	FPv%	Count											
Party	Candidate	FPv%	1	2	3	4	5	6	7	8	9	10	11	12
Fianna Fáil	Senator Margaret Cox*	12.47	1,007	1,020	1,035	1,076	1,102	1,208						
Progressive Democrats	Donal Lyons*	17.56	1,007	1,010	1,032	1,035	1,053	1,095	1,099	1,123	1,229			
Progressive Democrats	Paul Colleran	11.80	677	686	691	703	727	742	748	788	815	831	893	1,008
Fianna Fáil	Eddie Coughlan	9.96	571	575	579	585	592	646	687	695	740	755	801	865
Fine Gael	John Mulholland*	9.83	564	580	586	614	623	643	648	670	689	702	893	1,015
Fine Gael	Bernard O'Farrell	5.21	299	301	304	342	348	363	363	379	411	424		
Fianna Fáil	Eileen Tighe	6.24	263	274	283	283	286							
Independent	Pat Maher	4.48	257	270	290	292	314	323	325	346				
Labour	Marc O Riain	4.43	254	257	260	270	326	336	337	488	522	530	579	
Labour	Derrick Hambleton	4.31	247	248	254	266	317	322	323					
Green	Fintan Convery	4.05	232	239	242	246								
Fine Gael	Peter O'Neill	2.89	166	167	167									
Independent	Michael Prendergast	1.67	96	99										
Independent	Eileen Manning	1.66	95											
Electorate: 12,505 Valid: 5,735 (45.86%) Spoilt: 70 Quota: 1,148 Turnout: 5,805 (46.82%)
