= 2004 Galway City Council election =

2004 Irish local government election

- 11 June 2004

All 15 seats on Galway City Council
	First party	Second party	Third party
Party	Labour	Progressive Democrats	Fine Gael
Seats won	4	3	3
Seat change	+2	-1	-1
	Fourth party	Fifth party	Sixth party
Party	Fianna Fáil	Sinn Féin	Green
Seats won	2	1	1
Seat change	-3	+1	+1
	Seventh party
Party	Independent
Seats won	1
Seat change	+1
- Map showing the area of Galway City Council
Council control after election
TBD

An election to Galway City Council took place on 11 June 2004 as part of that year's Irish local elections. 15 councillors were elected from three local electoral areas by PR-STV voting for a five-year term of office.

== Results by party ==
Party	Seats	±	First Pref. votes	FPv%	±%
Labour	4	+2	3,816	16.49	
Progressive Democrats	3	-1	5,235	22.63	
Fine Gael	3	-1	3,945	17.05	
Fianna Fáil	2	-3	4,440	19.19	
Sinn Féin	1	+1	1,942	8.39	
Green	1	+1	1,683	7.27	
Independent	1	+1	2,075	8.97	
Totals	15	-	23,136	100.00	—

== Results by local electoral area ==
=== Galway No.1 ===
Galway No.1 - 7 seats
Party	Candidate	FPv%	Count												
Party	Candidate	FPv%	1	2	3	4	5	6	7	8	9	10	11	12	13
Independent	Michael Crowe	10.50	1,027	1,033	1,050	1,069	1,106	1,143	1,185	1,232					
Progressive Democrats	Declan McDonnell*	10.24	1,002	1,004	1,011	1,024	1,036	1,052	1,090	1,093	1,115	1,116	1,138	1,185	1,356
Fine Gael	Brian Walsh	8.91	872	873	890	950	962	1,052	1,067	1,072	1,234				
Sinn Féin	Daniel Callanan	8.55	836	840	842	851	874	882	903	946	961	961	1,042	1,071	1,117
Progressive Democrats	Terry O'Flaherty*	7.81	764	773	790	805	840	867	886	900	930	933	959	1,055	1,193
Fianna Fáil	Michael Leahy*	6.60	646	652	690	704	707	722	794	811	846	847	874	1,078	1,151
Labour	Tom Costello*	6.39	625	647	655	659	691	697	709	741	790	793	904	957	1,097
Progressive Democrats	Gary Creaven	5.95	582	585	595	602	627	635	649	654	689	690	715	780	
Fianna Fáil	Johanna Downes	4.53	443	448	474	478	512	518	566	581	595	595	623		
Labour	Derek Nolan	4.50	440	478	486	495	524	539	553	617	641	642	801	835	878
Green	Kieran Cunnane	4.25	416	426	428	440	453	469	473	555	578	579			
Fine Gael	Fintan Coogan*	3.50	342	344	348	378	393	448	454	469					
Independent	Tokie Laotan-Brown	3.18	311	315	316	324	344	351	361						
Independent	Peter Rowland	3.16	309	317	321	323									
Fianna Fáil	Michael Kelly	3.13	306	307	326	331	339	348							
Fine Gael	Niall McNelis	2.93	287	290	291	330	335								
Fine Gael	Geraldine Gantly	2.60	254	255	258										
Fianna Fáil	Fearghal Wall	1.94	190	192											
Labour	Nuala O'Hara	1.34	131												
Electorate: 18,815 Valid: 9,783 (52.0%) Spoilt: 174 Quota: 1,223 Turnout: 9,957 (52.92%)

=== Galway No.2 ===
Galway No.2 - 4 seats
Party	Candidate	FPv%	Count					
Party	Candidate	FPv%	1	2	3	4	5	6
Fianna Fáil	John Connolly	16.75	887	912	1,038	1,416		
Sinn Féin	Ann Marie Carroll	13.94	738	794	837	864	892	897
Labour	Billy Cameron	13.43	711	831	942	1,042	1,111	
Labour	Colette Connolly	12.16	644	789	854	920	972	986
Fine Gael	Padraig Conneely	11.71	620	656	746	838	900	910
Fianna Fáil	Martin Quinn*	11.54	611	645	746			
Progressive Democrats	Mike Geraghty	10.39	550	623				
Green	Aoibheann McCann	7.29	386					
Independent	Paul Osikoya	2.81	149					
Electorate: 10,577 Valid: 5,296 (50.07%) Spoilt: 109 Quota: 1,060 Turnout: 5,405 (51.10%)

=== Galway No.3 ===
Galway No.3 - 4 seats
Party	Candidate	FPv%	Count								
Party	Candidate	FPv%	1	2	3	4	5	6	7	8	9
Progressive Democrats	Donal Lyons*	20.55	1,656								
Labour	Catherine Connolly*	15.70	1,265	1,338	1,432	1,437	1,520	1,565	1,660		
Fine Gael	John Mulholland*	11.79	950	975	996	1,004	1,314	1,439	1,802		
Green	Niall O Brolchain	10.93	881	959	1,088	1,094	1,157	1,199	1,305	1,386	1,413
Fianna Fáil	Tom Cox*	9.00	725	731	764	767	795	1,095	1,246	1,352	1,373
Progressive Democrats	Paul Colleran*	8.45	681	690	706	719	811	889			
Fianna Fáil	Val Hanley*	7.84	632	637	655	661	691				
Fine Gael	Maureen Egan	7.70	620	634	648	651					
Sinn Féin	Conan Campbell	4.57	368	411							
Independent	Paul Osikoya	3.46	279								
Electorate: 14,929 Valid: 8,057 (53.97%) Spoilt: 141 Quota: 1,612 Turnout: 8,198 (54.91%)
