= Rita Fagan =

Irish housing activist

- Occupations: Community development worker, housing activist
- Mother: Madge Fagan

Rita Fagan is an Irish housing activist and community development worker.

== Biography ==
Fagan is from Inchicore, Dublin. She works as a housing activist, and has spent 35 years as a community worker. Fagan believes that the right to housing needs to be added to the Constitution of Ireland, arguing that other countries in Europe like Finland, Belgium, Netherlands and Sweden have it. She is a project manager at St Michael's Family Resource Centre in Inchicore.

She went on five brigades to Nicaragua in 1989. In 2013, when the Irish Women Workers' Union had its 100th anniversary, she sang the Laundry Workers' Song at the unveiling of a plaque commemorating it. In 2017, Fagan spoke at a May Day rally in Dublin which Peter McVerry called for.

On 13 October 2025, Catherine Connolly told RTÉ News at One that a trip she took to Syria in 2018 was arranged by community activists including Fagan. Two days after the 2025 Irish presidential election, (Note: The presidential vote occurred on 24 October) Mick Wallace and Clare Daly revealed that they and Daly's sister Elaine Daly—who previously organised trips to Palestine—were the ones to organize it.
