= 2024 Galway City Council election =

Part of the 2024 Irish local elections

- 07 June 2024

All 18 seats on Galway City Council 10 seats needed for a majority
- Turnout: 44.40%
	First party	Second party	Third party
Party	Fianna Fáil	Fine Gael	Sinn Féin
Last election	5	3	0
Seats won	4	4	1
Seat change	▼1	▲1	▲1
	Fourth party	Fifth party	Sixth party
Party	Green	Labour	Social Democrats
Last election	2	1	1
Seats won	0	3	2
Seat change	▼2	▲2	▲1
	Seventh party
Party	Independent
Last election	6
Seats won	4
Seat change	▼2
- Results by Local Electoral Area

An election to all 18 seats on Galway City Council was held in Galway in Ireland on 7 June 2024 as part of the 2024 Irish local elections. Councillors were to be elected for a five-year term of office from 3 local electoral areas (LEAs) on the electoral system of proportional representation by means of the single transferable vote (PR-STV).

== Retiring incumbents ==
The following councillors were not seeking re-election:

Constituency	Departing Councillor	Party
Galway City Central	Imelda Byrne	Fianna Fáil
Galway City Central	Collette Connolly	Independent

== Results by party ==
Party	Candidates	Seats	±	1st pref	%	±%
Fine Gael	6	4	▲1	4,507	18.51	▲2.66
Fianna Fáil	5	4	▼1	4,248	17.44	▼3.03
Labour	3	3	▲2	1,901	7.81	▲0.84
Social Democrats	3	2	▲1	1,762	7.23	▲1.24
Sinn Féin	3	1	▲1	1,469	6.03	▲0.66
Green	3	0	▼2	1,206	4.95	▼4.47
People Before Profit	3	0	Steady	581	2.39	▲0.80
Independent Ireland	2	0	New	511	2.10	New
Aontú	2	0	Steady	461	1.89	▼0.53
Irish Freedom	3	0	New	444	1.82	New
The Irish People	3	0	New	435	1.79	New
Solidarity	1	0	Steady	129	0.53	▼0.33
Independent	15	4	▼2	6,700	27.51	▼2.62
Total	52	18	Steady		100.00	—N/a

== Results by local electoral area ==
*: Outgoing councillor elected in 2019.
†: Outgoing councillor coopted subsequent to the 2019 election.
‡: Outgoing councillor coopted in 2023 to Galway City East now contesting Galway City West

=== Galway City Central ===
Galway City Central: 6 seats
Party	Candidate	FPv%	Count										
Party	Candidate	FPv%	1	2	3	4	5	6	7	8	9	10	11
Independent	Mike Cubbard	19.5%	1,486										
Fine Gael	Eddie Hoare	16.9%	1,282										
Fine Gael	Frank Fahy	11.6%	882	945	1,036	1,037	1,038	1,042	1,052	1,064	1,112		
Fianna Fáil	Josie Ford	9.6%	732	805	848	851	855	862	875	887	909	932	1,017
Labour	John McDonagh	8.5%	643	710	726	729	731	734	758	767	851	902	965
Social Democrats	Eibhlín Seoighthe	7.6%	575	607	617	618	619	630	666	675	809	992	1,028
Sinn Féin	Mark Lohan	6.5%	498	541	545	547	550	557	571	587	606	689	739
Green	Martina O'Connor	4.2%	319	343	357	357	358	359	382	387			
Aontú	Padraig Lenihan	4.0%	307	321	328	332	339	366	382	477	491	503	
People Before Profit	Adrian Curran	4.0%	304	327	330	330	332	336	380	394	413		
Independent	Margaretta D'Arcy	2.3%	175	191	194	205	211	218					
Irish Freedom	Mary Cummins	2.2%	169	181	182	189	242	270	281				
Independent Ireland	Shauna Ridge	1.3%	98	114	115	118	129						
The Irish People	Sean Comer	1.0%	79	88	90	105							
Independent	Dara O'Flaherty	0.6%	49	51	51								
Independent	Patrick Feeney	0.1%	8	13	13								
Electorate: 18,206 Valid: 7,606 Spoilt: 127 Quota: 1,087 Turnout: 7,733 (42.48%)

=== Galway City East ===
Galway City East: 6 seats
Party	Candidate	FPv%	Count													
Party	Candidate	FPv%	1	2	3	4	5	6	7	8	9	10	11	12	13	14
Fianna Fáil	Alan Cheevers	12.89%	1,031	1,033	1,040	1,040	1,043	1,049	1,053	1,057	1,070	1,156				
Independent	Declan McDonnell	12.61%	1,009	1,012	1,017	1,018	1,024	1,037	1,042	1,063	1,073	1,087	1,146			
Independent	Terry O'Flaherty	11.45%	916	924	928	929	930	945	952	964	981	1,020	1,095	1,144		
Fianna Fáil	Michael Crowe	9.20%	736	740	742	742	743	751	754	759	761	782	802	821	918	920
Fine Gael	Shane Forde	8.31%	665	667	667	667	667	672	675	677	684	788	817	843	932	936
Sinn Féin	Aisling Burke	7.80%	624	628	636	645	650	656	693	702	736	747	790	895	985	988
Labour	Helen Ogbu	7.31%	585	588	586	607	608	611	634	637	777	815	857	1,045	1,102	1,105
Independent Ireland	Noel Larkin	5.16%	413	418	422	424	436	464	471	543	550	572	623	645		
Independent	Michael Tully	4.40%	352	356	365	367	370	379	384	410	416	436				
Fine Gael	Aisling Keogh	4.15%	332	334	338	340	342	344	349	352	362					
Social Democrats	Justine Delaney Heaslip	3.79%	303	309	311	324	324	326	372	374	425	443	462			
Green	Joyce Mathias	3.59%	287	292	295	298	298	301	322	326						
Aontú	Cormac Ó Corcoráin	1.92%	154	154	158	158	169									
Solidarity	Conor Burke	1.61%	129	133	137	181	185	186								
The Irish People	Jacinta Gibbons	1.59%	127	130	133	133	183	225	231							
Irish Freedom	Susan Feeney	1.41%	113	117	118	120										
PBP–Solidarity	Denman Rooke	1.09%	87	90	91											
Independent	David Lynch	0.87%	70	72												
Independent	Conor Dowd	0.72%	58													
Independent	Arkadiusz Wozniak	0.12%	10													
Electorate: 18,110 Valid: 8,001 Spoilt: 101 Quota: 1,144 Turnout: 8,102 (44.74%)

=== Galway City West ===
Galway City West: 6 seats
Party	Candidate	FPv%	Count													
Party	Candidate	FPv%	1	2	3	4	5	6	7	8	9	10	11	12	13	14
Independent	Donal Lyons	15.96%	1,415													
Fine Gael	Clodagh Higgins	12.12%	1,074	1,106	1,108	1,111	1,112	1,221	1,232	1,247	1,309					
Fianna Fáil	John Connolly	11.07%	981	1,004	1,005	1,013	1,013	1,043	1,085	1,132	1,184	1,224	1,232	1,236	1,325	
Social Democrats	Alan Curran	9.97%	884	897	902	902	983	999	1,010	1,122	1,168	1,289				
Fianna Fáil	Peter Keane	8.66%	768	789	791	794	795	806	820	823	856	868	877	877	964	995
Labour	Níall McNelis	7.59%	673	701	703	706	723	741	758	808	870	976	998	1,010	1,156	1,181
Green	Niall Murphy	6.77%	600	606	610	612	637	652	657	678	705	784	790	805	900	905
Independent	Kenny Deery	4.51%	400	408	411	418	419	426	476	498	585	624	629	637		
Independent	Esther Oghomwenrie Osayimwen	4.14%	367	370	370	375	411	451	462	489	511					
Sinn Féin	Cathal Ó Conchúir	3.91%	347	351	352	359	381	390	409							
Independent	Jarlath Feeney	3.90%	346	361	367	377	380	388	434	466						
Fine Gael	Asraf Chowdhury	3.07%	272	277	280	280	282									
The Irish People	A.J. Cahill	2.58%	229	231	233	330	332	334								
People Before Profit	Maisie McMaster	2.14%	190	191	195	198										
Irish Freedom	Rory Ó Beirn	1.83%	162	164	166											
Independent	Denis Nealis	0.44%	39	41												
Electorate: 18,533 Valid: 8,747 Spoilt: 117 Quota: 1,250 Turnout: 8,864 (47.83%)
