= 2014 Galway City Council election =

Part of the 2014 Irish local elections

- 23 May 2014

All 18 seats on Galway City Council 10 seats needed for a majority
	First party	Second party	Third party
Party	Fine Gael	Fianna Fáil	Sinn Féin
Seats won	4	3	3
Seat change	+1	-	+3
	Fourth party	Fifth party
Party	Labour	Independent
Seats won	2	6
Seat change	-3	+2
- Map showing the area of Galway City Council
Council control before election
Labour
Council control after election
Fine Gael

An election to all 18 seats on Galway City Council took place on 23 May 2014 as part of the 2014 Irish local elections, an increase of 3 seats from 2009 election. The city of Galway was divided into three local electoral areas (LEAs) to elect councillors for a five-year term of office on the electoral system of proportional representation by means of the single transferable vote (PR-STV)

Twenty-four-year-old Mairéad Farrell, a niece of Mairéad Farrell who was shot dead by the SAS in Gibraltar in 1988, won a seat at the first attempt. She was joined on the council by 2 other councillors as Sinn Féin won 3 seats. Their gains came chiefly at the expense of Labour who lost 3 fifths of their seats to return with just 2 councillors. While Fianna Fáil won the most votes the party did not make any gains in the election and returned just 3 councillors as in 2009. By contrast Fine Gael gained a seat to become the largest party. Independents were the big winners, topping the poll in all LEAs and increasing their existing numbers by 2 seats.

== Results by party ==
Party	Seats	±	1st pref	FPv%	±%
Fine Gael	4	▲1	3,446	15.8	
Fianna Fáil	3	Steady	4,256	19.5	
Sinn Féin	3	▲3	2,074	9.5	
Labour	2	▼3	2,370	10.8	
Anti-Austerity Alliance	0	Steady	985	4.51	
Green	0	Steady	479	2.19	
People Before Profit	0	Steady	128	0.59	
Independent	6	▲2	8,116	37.1	
Total	18	▲3	21,854	100.0	

== Results by local electoral area ==
*: Outgoing councillor.

=== Galway City Central ===
Galway City Central: 6 seats
Party	Candidate	FPv%	Count								
Party	Candidate	FPv%	1	2	3	4	5	6	7	8	9
Independent	Mike Cubbard	13.36	850	866	911						
Fianna Fáil	Ollie Crowe	12.98	826	827	831	842	845	862	902	1,123	
Fine Gael	Frank Fahy	10.42	663	663	668	673	674	702	735	764	797
Labour	Billy Cameron	9.01	573	581	606	695	719	819	855	937	
Fine Gael	Pádraig Conneely	8.52	542	545	559	585	594	626	678	748	786
Sinn Féin	Anna Marley	7.91	503	524	534	554	631	656	718	782	796
Fianna Fáil	Nicola Deacy	7.91	503	504	512	550	563	596	650		
Green	Séamus Sheridan	7.53	479	495	516	529	565	618	671	721	751
Independent	Cormac O Corcoráin	5.26	335	341	360	364	427	440			
Labour	Colette Connolly	4.26	271	279	281	328	342				
Labour	John McDonagh	4.15	264	267	271						
Anti-Austerity Alliance	Seán Byrne	3.69	235	285	294	301					
Independent	Mike Geraghty	2.62	167	173							
People Before Profit	Kiran Emrich	2.01	128								
Independent	Jimmy Horan	0.38	24								
Electorate: 12,488 Valid: 6,363 (50.95%) Spoilt: 83 Quota: 910 Turnout: 6,446 (51.62%)

=== Galway City East ===
Galway City East: 6 seats
Party	Candidate	FPv%	Count								
Party	Candidate	FPv%	1	2	3	4	5	6	7	8	9
Independent	Terry O'Flaherty	20.4%	1,405								
Independent	Declan McDonnell	15.7%	1,085								
Fianna Fáil	Michael Crowe	12.5%	860	923	940	950	986				
Sinn Féin	Mairéad Farrell	11.3%	782	829	842	859	874	897	1,074		
Independent	Noel Larkin	7.4%	513	598	622	634	673	697	779	827	936
Fianna Fáil	Alan Cheevers	6.5%	451	484	491	492	505	557	586	595	654
Fine Gael	John Walsh	5.8%	398	450	463	476	554	694	710	717	855
Anti-Austerity Alliance	Conor Burke	5.2%	357	384	390	400	408	426			
Labour	Monica Coughlan	4.7%	327	367	377	439	475	524	558	577	
Fine Gael	John Rabbitte	4.5%	311	333	338	344	397				
Fine Gael	Margot Kelly	3.8%	262	294	296	312					
Labour	Nuala Nolan	2.1%	142	161	164						
Electorate: 14,010 Valid: 6,893 Spoilt: 101 Quota: 985 Turnout: 6,994 (49.2%)

=== Galway City West ===
Galway City West: 6 seats
Party	Candidate	FPv%	Count						
Party	Candidate	FPv%	1	2	3	4	5	6	7
Independent	Donal Lyons	21.77	1,872						
Independent	Catherine Connolly	17.60	1,513						
Fianna Fáil	Peter Keane	10.51	904	991	1,011	1,015	1,043	1,064	1,102
Fine Gael	Pearce Flannery	9.27	797	892	910	918	950	977	1,273
Labour	Níall McNelis	9.22	793	924	989	1,001	1,057	1,123	1,240
Sinn Féin	Cathal O Conchúir	9.18	789	841	888	897	940	1,122	1,147
Fianna Fáil	David Burke	8.28	712	820	838	849	871	910	960
Fine Gael	Michelle Murphy	5.50	473	529	554	561	593	618	
Anti-Austerity Alliance	Tommy Holohan	4.57	393	432	472	484	540		
Independent	Tommy Roddy	3.14	270	320	353	401			
Independent	Marc Anderson	0.95	82	107	125				
Electorate: 17,606 Valid: 8,598 (48.84%) Spoilt: 86 Quota: 1,229 Turnout: 8,684 (49.32%)

== Changes ==
=== Co-options ===
Party	Outgoing	LEA	Reason	Date	Co-optee
Independent	Catherine Connolly	Galway City West	Elected to the 32nd Dáil at the 2016 general election.	21 March 2016	Colette Connolly
Sinn Féin	Anna Marley	Galway City Central	Resigned due to finding it difficult to balance family with council work.	12 September 2016	Mark Lohan
