= City Hall, Galway =

Municipal building in Galway, Ireland

- Halla na Cathrach, Gaillimh
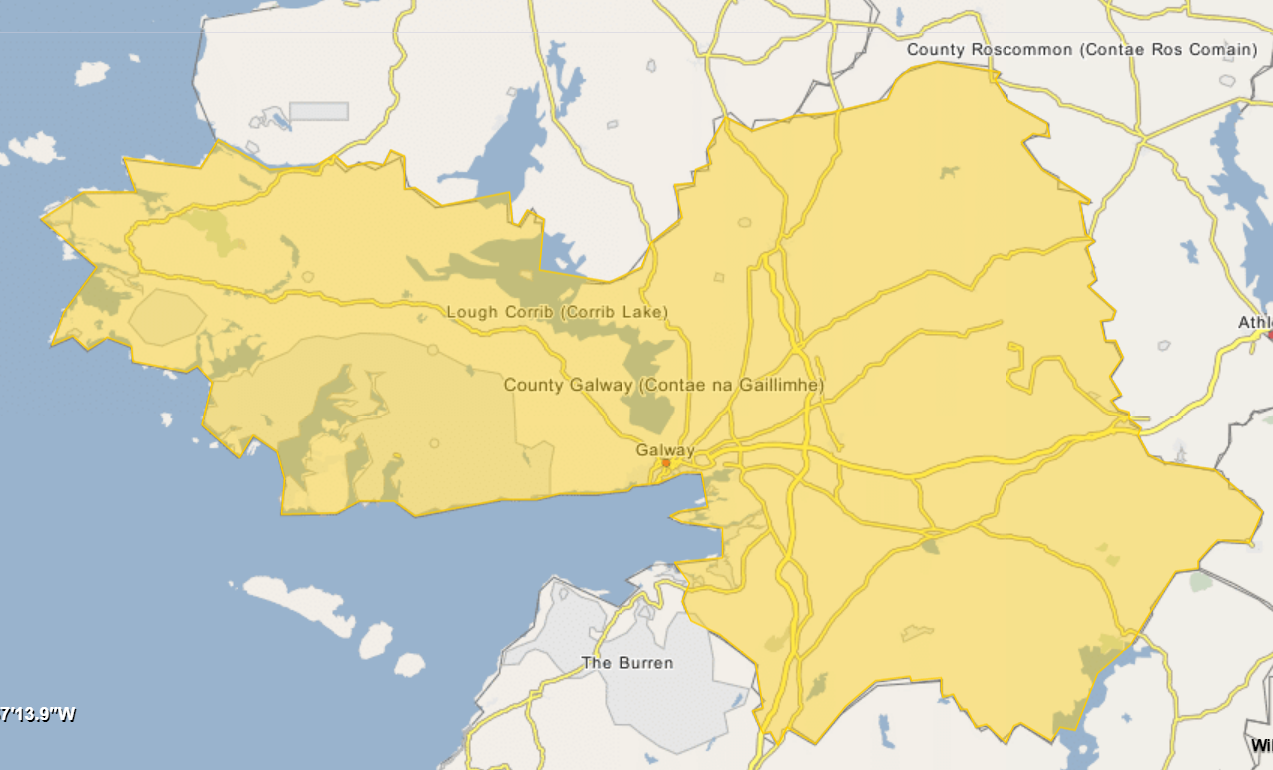
- Location within County Galway

General information
- Architectural style: Modern style
- Location: Crown Square, Galway, Ireland
- Coordinates: 53.2871°N 9.0218°W
- Completed: 2024
- Cost: €56 million

Design and construction
- Architect: Henry J. Lyons
- Main contractor: J. J. Rhatigan

City Hall (Irish: Halla na Cathrach, Gaillimh) is a municipal facility being fitted out at Crown Square in Galway, Ireland. It is scheduled to become the administrative centre of Galway City Council in 2024.

== History ==
The original municipal building in the city was the Tholsel which was built about 1639 and demolished in 1822. This was replaced by Galway Town Hall in Courthouse Square which was completed in 1825. After it was reformed in 1937, Galway Corporation was mostly based at offices in Dominick Street and Fishmarket. It moved to modern offices at College Lane in Galway in 1991.

In May 2005, the American company, Crown Equipment Corporation, decided to relocate its operations from Mervue Business Park on the east side of Galway to Suzhou in China. The site subsequently became the subject of a major reclamation and redevelopment project known as Crown Square. The new buildings on the site were designed by Henry J. Lyons in the Modern style, built by J. J. Rhatigan in steel and glass and were completed in 2022.

In September 2022, the council, having decided that it needed larger premises, announced that it would acquire one of the completed buildings for its new City Hall. The acquisition of the building was completed at a cost of €44 million in December 2022. The cost of the acquisition was financed by a loan from the Housing Finance Agency. The council also confirmed that it would let a fit-out contract, which could cost a further €12 million, with a view to relocating to the new premises in 2024.

It was revealed, in July 2024, that the total cost, including fit-out, could increase from €56 million to €75 million.
