= Mairéad Farrell =

Mairéad Farrell may refer to:

- Mairéad Farrell (IRA activist) (1957–1988) an IRA activist shot by the SAS in Gibraltar
- Mairéad Farrell (politician) (born 1990), Sinn Féin TD
- Mairead Ronan (née Farrell; born 1980), Irish broadcaster
