= Tokie Laotan-Brown =

Nigerian architect

- Born: Tokunbo Laotan; Germany
- Citizenship: Nigeria; Ireland
- Education: University of Nova Gorica; Università Iuav di Venezia
- Occupation: Environmentalist/Architect
- Known for: Research on marginalised African heritage

Tokie Laotan-Brown is an Irish-Nigerian heritage architect, cultural economist, and academic specializing in architectural conservation, cultural heritage and Afrocentric design methodologies. She is known for her research on marginalized heritage, African urban landscapes, and heritage restitution, as well as her work in heritage preservation and cultural policy.

In 2023, Laotan-Brown received the Michael Ventris Award for Architecture and was commissioned, along with 11 other women, for a calendar as one of the most influential women in Galway in 2006.

== Life ==
Laotan-Brown was born in Würzburg, Germany to Nigerian parents. She pursued higher education in architecture, heritage conservation and cultural economics, earning a Ph.D. in Economics and Techniques for the Conservation of Architectural and Environmental Heritage from the University of Nova Gorica and Università Iuav di Venezia.

Laotan-Brown has worked internationally as a heritage architect and consultant, focusing on conservation, restoration and cultural landscape assessment. She is the founder of Merging Ecologies Studio (UK & Ireland), where she integrates digital technologies such as CAD, HBIM, and photogrammetry into heritage preservation practices. She has contributed to heritage-related initiatives including World Heritage nomination processes, conservation appraisals, and cultural landscape projects with her work often emphasizes Afrocentric approaches and the inclusion of intangible cultural narratives in architectural conservation.

She has also held academic roles, including serving as a lecturer at the State University of New York, where she teaches courses in cultural studies and gender studies.

In 2004, she ran for councilor 2004 Galway City Council election.
