= Fares Shehabi =

Syrian politician and businessman

- Shebabi in a 2017 BSNews interview

Member of the People's Assembly of Syria
- In office 6 June 2016 – 2020
- Constituency: Aleppo

Personal details
- Born: 1972 (age 53–54) Aleppo, Syria
- Citizenship: United States; Syria
- Party: Independent
- Children: 2
- Parent: Ahmad Shehabi (father)
- Education: Ohio State University

Fares Shehabi (Arabic: فارس الشهابي; born 1972) is a Syrian businessman and politician. He was described as one of the most prominent financial and economic supporters of the Ba'athist regime in Aleppo.

== Personal life ==
Shehabi belongs to a family whose origins trace back to the city of al-Bab, east of Aleppo. The family name has been associated with Hikmat al-Shihabi, who served as head of Military Intelligence from 1971 to 1974, and later as Chief of the General Staff. He holds U.S. citizenship, according to a senior official in the European Union. He obtained a bachelor's degree in Industrial Engineering in 1996 from Ohio State University.

== Career ==
In 1990, he founded Alpha Pharmaceuticals in al-Mansoura, west of Aleppo, on an area of 63,000 square meters to produce various types of medicines, and it became one of the most important pharmaceutical companies in the country. Its management was headed by his father, Ahmad Shehabi. Al-Shihabi stood as an independent candidate in the 2016 elections for the People's Assembly, representing Aleppo Governorate. He lost his campaign for re-election in the 2020 elections.

In September 2018, he stated his hope for a settlement that avoids the battle for Syria to preserve the lives of soldiers and civilians in Idlib, since the objective of the battle is their "liberation from the clutches" of Al-Qaeda and Muslim Brotherhood Sharia rule. Yet, if a settlement cannot be found, a military solution remains the only choice to enforce submission and weapon surrender, as occurred in Daraa and Eastern Ghouta. Under this scenario, whoever refuses the terms must leave. This is because "we will not accept living next to traitors and agents" who cooperated with jihadist organizations for the benefit of NATO and certain "oil and gas watchmen" in the Gulf.
