= Ollie Crowe =

Irish politician

Senator Ollie Crowe
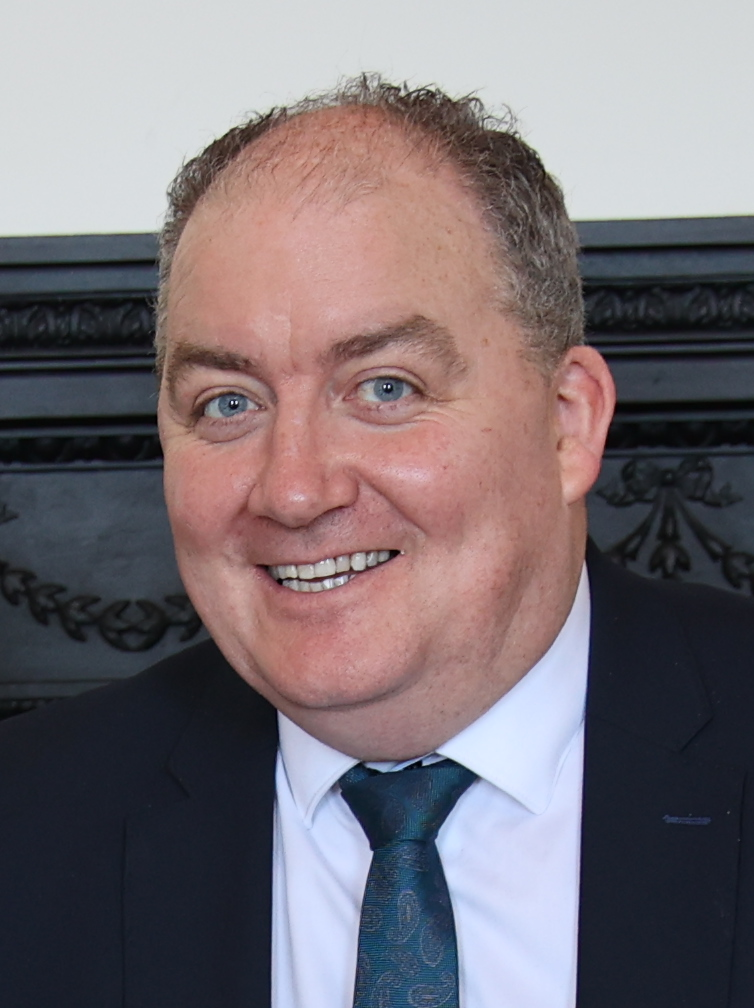

Senator
- Incumbent
- Assumed office 29 June 2020
- Constituency: Industrial and Commercial Panel

Personal details
- Party: Fianna Fáil

Ollie Crowe is an Irish Fianna Fáil politician who has served as a senator for the Industrial and Commercial Panel since April 2020.

Crowe unsuccessfully contested the 2020 general election in the Galway West constituency.

He was formerly a member of Galway City Council representing the Galway City Central local electoral area.

He is the Fianna Fáil Seanad spokesperson on Enterprise, Employment and Trade.
