= Galway City Council =

Local authority for Galway City, Ireland

Galway City Council Comhairle Cathrach na Gaillimhe

Type
- Type: City council of Galway

Leadership
- Mayor: Helen Ogbu, Lab

Structure
- Seats: 18
- Political groups: Fianna Fáil (4) Fine Gael (4) Labour (3) Social Democrats (1) Sinn Féin (1) Independent (5)

Elections
- Voting system: Single transferable vote
- Last election: 7 June 2024

Motto
- Laudatio Ejus Manet In Secula Seculorum "His Praise Remains unto Ages of Ages"

Meeting place
- City Hall, Galway

Website
- Official website

The area governed by the council

Galway City Council (Irish: Comhairle Cathrach na Gaillimhe) is the local authority of the city of Galway, Ireland. As a city council, it is governed by the Local Government Act 2001. The council is responsible for housing and community, roads and transportation, urban planning and development, amenity and culture, and environment. The council has 18 elected members. Elections are held every five years and are by single transferable vote. The head of the council has the title of mayor. The city administration is headed by a chief executive, Leonard Cleary. The council meets at City Hall, College Road, Galway.

== History ==
The earliest known charter dates from a grant of Richard II of England in 1395. The first Mayor of Galway was Peirce Lynch. A board of town commissioners was established by local act in 1836. The corporation was dissolved under the Municipal Corporations (Ireland) Act 1840, with the town commissioners as its successor.

Galway Town Improvement Act 1853
- Act of Parliament
- Parliament of the United Kingdom
- Long title: An Act for better paving, draining, cleansing, lighting, watching, supplying with Water, regulating in regard to Markets and other Purposes, for making new Streets, and otherwise improving the Town of Galway.
- Citation: 16 & 17 Vict. c. cc

Dates
- Royal assent: 15 August 1853

Text of statute as originally enacted

In 1853, 24 town commissioners were appointed under the Galway Town Improvement Act 1853 (16 & 17 Vict. c. cc). In 1899, under the Local Government (Ireland) Act 1898 (61 & 62 Vict. c. 37), the county of the town became an urban district of County Galway, with an urban district council succeeding the town commissioners. In 1937, the Urban District of Galway became the Borough of Galway, remaining part of County Galway. The borough council had 12 members. It increased to 15 members at the 1985 election, in anticipation of its conversion to a city council.

In 1986, the Borough of Galway became the County Borough of Galway and ceased to part of County Galway. The council was known as "The Mayor, Aldermen and Burgesses of the (County) Borough of Galway" from 1937 until the enactment of the Local Government Act 2001, under which it was renamed Galway City Council. In 2013, a Local Electoral Area Boundary Committee reviewed the allocation of seats and the local electoral areas across local authorities. In the case of Galway Council, it recommended an increase from 15 to 18 seats. This was implemented by the Local Government Reform Act 2014.

On 6 June 2018, the government announced that Galway City Council and Galway County Council were to be merged into a single local authority by 2021. As of late 2021, this proposal was reportedly "off the agenda".

== Regional assembly ==
Galway City Council has two representatives on the Northern and Western Regional Assembly where they are part of the West Strategic Planning Area Committee.

== Elections ==
Members of Galway City Council are elected for a five-year term of office on the electoral system of proportional representation by means of the single transferable vote (PR-STV) from multi-member local electoral areas (LEAs).

Year	FF	FG	Lab	GP	SD	SF	PDs	WP	Ind.	Total
2024	4	4	3	0	2	1	—N/a	0	4	18
2019	5	3	1	2	1	0	—N/a	0	6	18
2014	3	4	2	0	—N/a	3	—N/a	0	6	18
2009	3	3	5	0	—N/a	0	—N/a	0	4	15
2004	2	3	4	1	—N/a	1	3	0	1	15
1999	5	4	2	0	—N/a	0	4	0	0	15
1991	4	4	2	0	—N/a	0	4	0	1	15
1985	6	5	1	0	—N/a	0	—N/a	2	1	15

== Local electoral areas ==
Galway is divided into three LEAs, defined by electoral divisions. The electoral divisions were formerly known as wards and were defined in 1986.

LEA	Definition	Seats
Galway City Central	Claddagh, Dangan, Eyre Square, Mionlach, Newcastle, Nuns Island, Rahoon, Shantalla, and Toghroinn San Niocláis.	6
Galway City East	An Caisleán Gearr, Baile an Bhriotaigh, Ballybaan, Lough Atalia, Mervue, Murroogh, Renmore and Wellpark.	6
Galway City West	Bearna, Cnoc na Cathrach, Rockbarton, Salthill and Taylors Hill.	6

== Councillors ==
The following were elected at the 2024 Galway City Council election.

=== 2024 seats summary ===
Party	Seats
Fianna Fáil	4
Fine Gael	4
Labour	3
Social Democrats	2
Sinn Féin	1
Independent	4

=== Councillors by electoral area ===
This list reflects the order in which councillors were elected on 7 June 2024.

Council members from 2024 election
Local electoral area	Name	Party
Galway City Central	Mike Cubbard	Independent
Galway City Central	Eddie Hoare	Fine Gael
Galway City Central	Frank Fahy	Fine Gael
Galway City Central	Josie Forde	Fianna Fáil
Galway City Central	John McDonagh	Labour
Galway City Central	Eibhlín Seoighthe (Note: Changed party, see table below for details.)	Social Democrats
Galway City East	Alan Cheevers	Fianna Fáil
Galway City East	Declan McDonnell	Independent
Galway City East	Terry O'Flaherty	Independent
Galway City East	Shane Forde	Fine Gael
Galway City East	Aisling Burke	Sinn Féin
Galway City East	Helen Ogbu	Labour
Galway City West	Donal Lyons	Independent
Galway City West	Clodagh Higgins	Fine Gael
Galway City West	Alan Curran	Social Democrats
Galway City West	John Connolly (Note: Replaced during term, see table below for details.)	Fianna Fáil
Galway City West	Peter Keane	Fianna Fáil
Galway City West	Níall McNelis	Labour

==== Co-options ====
Party	Outgoing	LEA	Reason	Date	Co-optee
Fianna Fáil	John Connolly	Galway City West	Elected to 34th Dáil at the 2024 general election	16 December 2024	Mike Crowe

==== Changes in affiliation ====
Name	LEA	Elected as	New affiliation	Date
Eibhlín Seoighthe	Galway City Central	Social Democrats	Independent	31 July 2025
