= John Mannion =

John Mannion may refer to:

- John Mannion Snr (1907–1978), Irish Fine Gael politician
- John Mannion Jnr (1944–2006), his son, Irish Fine Gael politician
- John Mannion (American politician) (b. 1968), member of the U.S. House of Representatives from New York
