= Galway West =

Dáil constituency (1937–present)

- Dáil constituency
- Location of Galway West within Ireland
- Interactive map of constituency boundaries since the 2024 general election
- Major settlements: Clifden; Galway; Oranmore; Oughterard

Current constituency
- Created: 1937
- Seats: 3 (1937–1977); 4 (1977–1981); 5 (1981–)
- TDs: John Connolly (FF); Mairéad Farrell (SF); Noel Grealish (Ind); Hildegarde Naughton (FG); Seán Kyne (FG)
- Local government areas: County Galway; Galway City
- Created from: Galway
- EP constituency: Midlands–North-West

Galway West is a parliamentary constituency represented in Dáil Éireann, the lower house of the Irish parliament or Oireachtas. The constituency elects five deputies (Teachtaí Dála, commonly known as TDs) on the electoral system of proportional representation by means of the single transferable vote (PR-STV).

== History and boundaries ==
The constituency was created under the Electoral (Revision of Constituencies) Act 1935 and first used at the 1937 general election, when the former Galway constituency was split into Galway East and Galway West.

It currently spans the western half of County Galway, taking in Galway city, the Galway Gaeltacht, and Clifden.

The Constituency Review Report 2023 of the Electoral Commission recommended that at the next general election, the portion of the constituency in County Mayo be transferred to the constituency of Mayo.

The Electoral (Amendment) Act 2023 defines the constituency as:

"The city of Galway;

and in the county of Galway, the electoral divisions of:

Abhainn Ghabhla, An Cnoc Buí, An Uillinn, Ballynakill, Binn an Choire, Bunowen, Cleggan, Clifden, Cloch na Rón, Cushkillary, Derrycunlagh, Derrylea, Doonloughan, Errislannan, Inishbofin, Maíros, Rinvyle, Scainimh, Sillerna, in the former Rural District of Clifden;

An Carn Mór, An Spidéal, Árainn, Baile Chláir, Baile an Teampaill, Ballynacourty, Bearna, Ceathrú an Bhrúnaigh, Cill Aithnín, Clarinbridge, Eanach Dhúin, Galway Rural (part), Kilcummin, Leacach Beag, Liscananaun, Lisín an Bhealaigh, Maigh Cuilinn, Na Forbacha, Oranmore, Sailearna, Sliabh an Aonaigh, Tulaigh Mhic Aodháin, in the former Rural District of Galway;

An Chorr, An Crompán, An Fhairche, An Ros, An Turlach, Camas, Cill Chuimín, Conga, Garmna, Leitir Breacáin, Leitir Móir, Letterfore, Oughterard, Wormhole, in the former Rural District of Oughterard."

Changes to the Galway West constituency
Years	TDs	Boundaries	Notes
1937–1948	3	In County Galway, the borough of Galway and the district electoral divisions of Annaghdown (Galway), Annaghdown (Tuam), Ardrahan, Aughrim (Galway), Ballinduff, Ballintemple, Ballynacourty, Ballynakill, Barna, Belleville, Bencorr, Bunowen, Camus, Carnmore, Carrowbrowne, Castietaylor, Claregalway, Clarin-bridge, Cleggan, Clifden, Cloonbur, Cong, Crumpaun, Cur, Cushkillary, Deerpark, Derrycunlagh, Derrylea, Donaghpatrick, Doonloughan, Drumacoo, Errislannan, Furbogh, Galway Rural. Gorumna, Headford, Illion, Inishbofin, Inishmore, Kilcoona, Kilcummin (Galway), Kilcummin (Oughterard), Killannin, Killeany, Killeely Killeenavarra, Killower, Killursa, Knockboy, Lackaghbeg, Letterbrickaun, Letterfore, Lettermore, Liscananaun, Lisheenavalla, Moyeullen, Moyrus, Oranmore, Oughterard, Owengowla, Rahasane, Rinvyle, Ross, Roundstone, Selerna, Sillerna, Skannive, Slieveaneena, Spiddle, Stradbally Tullokyne, Turlough and Wormhole.	Created from Galway
1948–1961	3	In County Galway, the borough of Galway and the district electoral divisions of Ballynakill, Bencorr, Bunowen, Cleggan, Clifden, Cushkillary, Derrycunlagh, Derrylea, Doonloughan, Errislannan, Illion, Inishbofin, Knockboy, Moyrus, Owengowla, Rinvyle, Roundstone, Sillerna, Skannive; Camus, Cloonbur, Cong, Crumpaun, Cur, Gorumna, Kilcummin, Letter-brickaun, Letterfore, Lettermore, Oughterard, Ross, Turlough, Worm-hole; Ballintemple, Barna, Carrowbrowne, Furbogh, Galway Rural, Inishmore, Kilcummin, Killannin, Moycullen, Selerna, Slieveaneena, Spiddle and Tullokyne.	
1961–1969	3	In County Galway, the borough of Galway and the district electoral divisions of Ballynakill, Bencorr, Bunowen, Cleggan, Clifden, Cushkillary, Derrycunlagh, Derrylea, Doonloughan, Errislannan, Illion, Inishbofin, Knockboy, Moyrus, Owengowla, Rinvyle, Roundstone, Sillerna, Skannive, in the former Rural District of Clifden; Annaghdown, Ballintemple, Barna, Carnmore, Carrowbrowne, Claregalway, Furbogh, Galway Rural, Inishmore, Kilcummin, Killannin, Liscananaun, Moycullen, Oranmore, Selerna, Slieveaneena, Spiddle, Tullokyne, in the former Rural District of Galway; Camus, Cloonbur, Cong, Crumpaun, Cur, Gorumna, Kilcummin, Letterbrickaun, Letterfore, Lettermore, Oughterard, Ross, Turlough, Wormhole, in the former Rural District of Oughterard.	
1969–1977	3	In County Galway, the borough of Galway and the district electoral divisions of Ballynakill, Bencorr, Bunowen, Cleggan, Clifden, Cushkillary, Derrycunlagh, Derrylea, Doonloughan, Errislannan, Illion, Inishbofin, Knockboy, Moyrus, Owengowla, Rinvyle, Roundstone, Sillerna, Skannive, in the former Rural District of Clifden; Annaghdown, Ballintemple, Barna, Carnmore, Carrowbrowne, Claregalway, Furbogh, Galway Rural, Inishmore, Kilcummin, Killannin, Moycullen, Oranmore, Selerna, Slieveaneena, Spiddle, Tullokyne, in the former Rural District of Galway; Camus, Cloonbur, Cong, Crumpaun, Cur, Gorumna, Kilcummin, Letterbrickaun, Letterfore, Lettermore, Oughterard, Ross, Turlough, Wormhole, in the former Rural District of Oughterard.	
1977–1981	4	In County Galway, the borough of Galway and the district electoral divisions of Ballynakill, Bencorr, Bunowen, Cleggan, Clifden, Cushkillary, Derrycunlagh, Derrylea, Doonloughan, Errislannan, Illion, Inishbofin, Knockboy, Moyrus, Owengowla, Rinvyle, Roundstone, Sillerna, Skannive, in the former Rural District of Clifden; Annaghdown, Ballintemple, Ballynacourty, Barna, Carnmore, Carrowbrowne, Claregalway, Clarinbridge, Furbogh, Galway Rural, Inishmore, Kilcummin, Killannin, Moycullen, Oranmore, Selerna, Slieveaneena, Spiddle, Stradbally, Tullokyne, in the former Rural District of Galway; Ardrahan, Cahermore, Castletaylor, Doorus, Drumacoo, Killeely, Killeenavarra, Killinny, Kinvarra, Rahasane, Skehanagh, in the former Rural District of Gort; Camus, Cloonbur, Cong, Crumpaun, Cur, Gorumna, Kilcummin, Letterbrickaun, Letterfore, Lettermore, Oughterard, Ross, Turlough, Wormhole, in the former Rural District of Oughterard; and in County Clare, the district electoral divisions of Abbey, Carran, Castletown, Derreen, Drumcreehy, Gleninagh, Lisdoonvarna, Mount Elva, Noughaval, Oughtmama, Rathborney, in the former Rural District of Ballyvaghan; Ballyeighter, Boston, Corrofin, Glenroe, Killinaboy, Kiltoraght, Muckanagh, Rath, Ruan, in the former Rural District of Corrofin; Dysert, Templemaley, in the former Rural District of Ennis; Ballagh, Ballyea, Ballysteen, Cloghaun, Clooney, Ennistimon, Kilfenora, Killaspuglonane, Killilagh, Kilshanny, Liscannor, Lurraga, Magherareagh, Smithstown, in the former Rural District of Ennistimon.	
1981–1987	5	County Galway, except the parts in the constituencies of Galway East and Roscommon	
1987–1992	5	County Borough of Galway; and County Galway, except the parts in the constituencies of Galway East and Roscommon	Galway City became a separate local government area in 1986
1992–1997	5	County Borough of Galway; and County Galway, except the parts in the constituencies of Galway East, Mayo East and Mayo West	Transfer of Headford area to Mayo West
1997–2002	5	County Borough of Galway; and County Galway, except the parts in the constituency of Galway East	Transfer of Headford Area from Mayo West
2002–2016	5	Galway City; and County Galway, except the parts in the constituency of Galway East.	Transfer to Galway East of territory in the former Rural District of Tuam
2016–2020	5	Galway City and in County Galway, the electoral divisions of Abhainn Ghabhla, An Cnoc Buí, An Uillinn, Ballynakill, Binn an Choire, Bunowen, Cleggan, Clifden, Cloch na Rón, Cushkillary, Derrycunlagh, Derrylea, Doonloughan, Errislannan, Inishbofin, Maíros, Rinvyle, Scainimh, Sillerna, in the former Rural District of Clifden; An Carn Mór, An Spidéal, Árainn, Aughrim, Baile Chláir, Baile an Teampaill, Ballynacourty, Bearna, Belleville, Ceathrú an Bhrúnaigh, Cill Aithnín, Clarinbridge, Deerpark, Eanach Dhúin, Galway Rural (part), Kilcummin, Leacach Beag, Liscananaun, Lisín an Bhealaigh, Maigh Cuilinn, Na Forbacha, Oranmore, Sailearna, Sliabh an Aonaigh, Stradbally, Tulaigh Mhic Aodháin, in the former Rural District of Galway; An Chorr, An Crompán, An Fhairche, An Ros, An Turlach, Camas, Cill Chuimín, Conga, Garmna, Leitir Breacáin, Leitir Móir, Letterfore, Oughterard, Wormhole, in the former Rural District of Oughterard; and in County Mayo, the electoral divisions of Ballinrobe, Cong, Dalgan, Houndswood, Kilcommon, Kilmaine, Neale, Shrule, in the former Rural District of Ballinrobe; Garrymore in the former Rural District of Claremorris.	Transfer from Mayo of Ballinrobe, Cong, Dalgan, Houndswood, Kilcommon, Kilmaine, Neale, Shrule, in the former Rural District of Ballinrobe; Garrymore in the former Rural District of Claremorris.
2020–	5	Galway City and in County Galway, the electoral divisions of Abhainn Ghabhla, An Cnoc Buí, An Uillinn, Ballynakill, Binn an Choire, Bunowen, Cleggan, Clifden, Cloch na Rón, Cushkillary, Derrycunlagh, Derrylea, Doonloughan, Errislannan, Inishbofin, Maíros, Rinvyle, Scainimh, Sillerna, in the former Rural District of Clifden; An Carn Mór, An Spidéal, Árainn, Baile Chláir, Baile an Teampaill, Ballynacourty, Bearna, Ceathrú an Bhrúnaigh, Cill Aithnín, Clarinbridge, Eanach Dhúin, Galway Rural (part), Kilcummin, Leacach Beag, Liscananaun, Lisín an Bhealaigh, Maigh Cuilinn, Na Forbacha, Oranmore, Sailearna, Sliabh an Aonaigh, Tulaigh Mhic Aodháin, in the former Rural District of Galway; An Chorr, An Crompán, An Fhairche, An Ros, An Turlach, Camas, Cill Chuimín, Conga, Garmna, Leitir Breacáin, Leitir Móir, Letterfore, Oughterard, Wormhole, in the former Rural District of Oughterard; and in County Mayo, the electoral divisions of Cong, Dalgan, Houndswood, Kilmaine, Neale, Shrule, in the former Rural District of Ballinrobe.	Transfer to Galway East of Aughrim, Belleville, Deerpark, Stradbally, in the former Rural District of Galway and transfer to Mayo of Ballinrobe and Kilcommon in the former Rural District of Ballinrobe and Garrymore in the former Rural District of Claremorris.

== TDs ==
Teachtaí Dála (TDs) for Galway West 1937–
Key to parties: FF = Fianna Fáil; FG = Fine Gael; Lab = Labour; PDs = Progressive Democrats; SF = Sinn Féin; Ind = Independent
Dáil	Election	Deputy (Party)	Deputy (Party)	Deputy (Party)	Deputy (Party)	Deputy (Party)
9th	1937	Gerald Bartley (FF)	Joseph Mongan (FG)	Seán Tubridy (FF)	3 seats 1937–1977	
10th	1938	Gerald Bartley (FF)	Joseph Mongan (FG)	Seán Tubridy (FF)	3 seats 1937–1977	
10th	1940 by-election	Gerald Bartley (FF)	Joseph Mongan (FG)	John J. Keane (FF)	3 seats 1937–1977	
11th	1943	Gerald Bartley (FF)	Joseph Mongan (FG)	Eamon Corbett (FF)	3 seats 1937–1977	
12th	1944	Gerald Bartley (FF)	Joseph Mongan (FG)	Michael Lydon (FF)	3 seats 1937–1977	
13th	1948	Gerald Bartley (FF)	Joseph Mongan (FG)	Michael Lydon (FF)	3 seats 1937–1977	
14th	1951	Gerald Bartley (FF)	John Mannion Snr (FG)	Peadar Duignan (FF)	3 seats 1937–1977	
15th	1954	Gerald Bartley (FF)	Fintan Coogan Snr (FG)	Johnny Geoghegan (FF)	3 seats 1937–1977	
16th	1957	Gerald Bartley (FF)	Fintan Coogan Snr (FG)	Johnny Geoghegan (FF)	3 seats 1937–1977	
17th	1961	Gerald Bartley (FF)	Fintan Coogan Snr (FG)	Johnny Geoghegan (FF)	3 seats 1937–1977	
18th	1965	Bobby Molloy (FF)	Fintan Coogan Snr (FG)	Johnny Geoghegan (FF)	3 seats 1937–1977	
19th	1969	Bobby Molloy (FF)	Fintan Coogan Snr (FG)	Johnny Geoghegan (FF)	3 seats 1937–1977	
20th	1973	Bobby Molloy (FF)	Fintan Coogan Snr (FG)	Johnny Geoghegan (FF)	3 seats 1937–1977	
20th	1975 by-election	Bobby Molloy (FF)	Fintan Coogan Snr (FG)	Máire Geoghegan-Quinn (FF)	3 seats 1937–1977	
21st	1977	Bobby Molloy (FF)	John Mannion Jnr (FG)	Máire Geoghegan-Quinn (FF)	Bill Loughnane (FF)	4 seats 1977–1981
22nd	1981	Bobby Molloy (FF)	John Donnellan (FG)	Máire Geoghegan-Quinn (FF)	Mark Killilea Jnr (FF)	Michael D. Higgins (Lab)
23rd	1982 (Feb)	Bobby Molloy (FF)	John Donnellan (FG)	Máire Geoghegan-Quinn (FF)	Frank Fahey (FF)	Michael D. Higgins (Lab)
24th	1982 (Nov)	Bobby Molloy (FF)	John Donnellan (FG)	Máire Geoghegan-Quinn (FF)	Frank Fahey (FF)	Fintan Coogan Jnr (FG)
25th	1987	Bobby Molloy (PDs)	John Donnellan (FG)	Máire Geoghegan-Quinn (FF)	Frank Fahey (FF)	Michael D. Higgins (Lab)
26th	1989	Bobby Molloy (PDs)	Pádraic McCormack (FG)	Máire Geoghegan-Quinn (FF)	Frank Fahey (FF)	Michael D. Higgins (Lab)
27th	1992	Bobby Molloy (PDs)	Pádraic McCormack (FG)	Máire Geoghegan-Quinn (FF)	Éamon Ó Cuív (FF)	Michael D. Higgins (Lab)
28th	1997	Bobby Molloy (PDs)	Pádraic McCormack (FG)	Frank Fahey (FF)	Éamon Ó Cuív (FF)	Michael D. Higgins (Lab)
29th	2002	Noel Grealish (PDs)	Pádraic McCormack (FG)	Frank Fahey (FF)	Éamon Ó Cuív (FF)	Michael D. Higgins (Lab)
30th	2007	Noel Grealish (PDs)	Pádraic McCormack (FG)	Frank Fahey (FF)	Éamon Ó Cuív (FF)	Michael D. Higgins (Lab)
31st	2011	Noel Grealish (Ind.)	Brian Walsh (FG)	Seán Kyne (FG)	Éamon Ó Cuív (FF)	Derek Nolan (Lab)
32nd	2016	Noel Grealish (Ind.)	Hildegarde Naughton (FG)	Seán Kyne (FG)	Éamon Ó Cuív (FF)	Catherine Connolly (Ind.)
33rd	2020	Noel Grealish (Ind.)	Hildegarde Naughton (FG)	Mairéad Farrell (SF)	Éamon Ó Cuív (FF)	Catherine Connolly (Ind.)
34th	2024	Noel Grealish (Ind.)	Hildegarde Naughton (FG)	Mairéad Farrell (SF)	John Connolly (FF)	Catherine Connolly (Ind.)
34th	2026 by-election	Noel Grealish (Ind.)	Hildegarde Naughton (FG)	Mairéad Farrell (SF)	John Connolly (FF)	Seán Kyne (FG)

Note: The columns in this table are used only for presentational purposes, and no significance should be attached to the order of columns. For details of the order in which seats were won at each election, see the detailed results of that election.

== Elections ==
*: Outgoing TD

=== 2026 by-election ===
2026 by-election: Galway West
Party	Candidate	FPv%	Count										
Party	Candidate	FPv%	1	2	3	4	5	6	7	8	9	10	11
Independent Ireland	Noel Thomas	20.9	10,007	10,038	10,477	10,497	11,075	12,246	12,947	13,897	14,694	15,246	16,519
Fine Gael	Seán Kyne	20.1	9,647	9,673	9,693	9,907	10,126	10,966	11,114	11,788	14,369	14,969	19,218
Labour	Helen Ogbu	11.4	5,462	5,560	5,578	5,970	6,545	6,763	7,457	8,500	9,063	12,960	
Fianna Fáil	Cillian Keane	8.8	4,192	4,201	4,226	4,259	4,401	4,668	4,749	5,154			
Independent	Mike Cubbard	7.1	3,396	3,440	3,524	3,595	3,908	4,140	4,737				
Social Democrats	Míde Nic Fhionnlaoich	7.0	3,354	3,551	3,569	3,836	4,440	4,587	5,409	5,938	6,158		
Sinn Féin	Mark Lohan	6.7	3,208	3,298	3,333	3,364	3,618	3,763					
Independent	Thomas Welby	6.6	3,138	3,161	3,193	3,219	3,351						
Independent	Sheila Garrity	3.0	1,421	1,542	1,568	1,696							
Green	Niall Murphy	2.5	1,199	1,241	1,252								
Aontú	Orla Nugent	2.4	1,167	1,194	1,368	1,397							
The Irish People	A.J. Cahill	1.9	890	949									
PBP–Solidarity	Denman Rooke	1.1	540										
Independent	Néill Bairéad	0.2	112										
Independent	Michael Ryan	0.2	108										
Independent	Patrick Feeney	0.1	39										
Independent	John O'Leary	0.0	13										
Electorate: 109,464 Valid: 47,893 Spoilt: 283 Quota: 23,947 Turnout: 48,176 (44.0%)

=== 2024 general election ===
2024 general election: Galway West
Party	Candidate	FPv%	Count															
Party	Candidate	FPv%	1	2	3	4	5	6	7	8	9	10	11	12	13	14	15	16
Sinn Féin	Mairéad Farrell	13.5	8,164	8,169	8,195	8,232	8,445	8,582	8,654	9,093	9,335	9,532	10,610					
Fianna Fáil	John Connolly	11.9	7,192	7,195	7,203	7,226	7,230	7,354	7,457	7,694	7,854	9,291	9,484	9,592	9,746	10,988		
Independent	Noel Grealish	11.4	6,887	6,888	6,905	6,951	6,956	7,228	7,265	7,702	7,777	7,969	8,079	8,148	8,222	8,717	9,081	9,649
Independent	Catherine Connolly	11.2	6,747	6,752	6,770	6,860	7,034	7,170	7,554	8,150	8,750	8,977	10,578					
Fine Gael	Hildegarde Naughton	10.0	6,011	6,014	6,015	6,025	6,031	6,065	6,353	6,473	6,741	7,082	7,395	7,474	7,644	10,942		
Independent Ireland	Noel Thomas	9.4	5,700	5,703	5,815	6,033	6,049	6,437	6,463	6,673	6,736	7,017	7,138	7,199	7,242	8,134	8,422	8,749
Fine Gael	Seán Kyne	8.8	5,335	5,335	5,338	5,349	5,351	5,402	5,522	5,600	5,727	6,042	6,235	6,281	6,371			
Fianna Fáil	Gráinne Seoige	4.9	2,929	2,932	2,934	2,937	2,941	2,962	3,016	3,082	3,162							
Independent	Mike Cubbard	3.7	2,219	2,219	2,250	2,291	2,310	2,419	2,451									
Social Democrats	Eibhlín Seoighthe	3.6	2,172	2,174	2,175	2,177	2,493	2,518	2,885	2,955	3,841	3,911						
Labour	Helen Ogbu	3.3	1,973	1,976	1,977	1,982	2,079	2,106	2,514	2,622								
Green	Pauline O'Reilly	3.0	1,839	1,839	1,840	1,843	1,892	1,918										
Aontú	Pádraig Lenihan	2.1	1,233	1,238	1,303	1,407	1,419											
PBP–Solidarity	Maisie McMaster (Note: McMaster is a member of People Before Profit.)	1.5	905	907	916	926												
The Irish People	AJ Cahill	0.8	469	475	631													
Irish Freedom	Doran McMahon	0.8	450	455														
Independent	Patrick Feeney	0.1	52															
Electorate: 103,713 Valid: 60,277 Spoilt: 375 Quota: 10,047 Turnout: 58.5%

=== 2020 general election ===
2020 general election: Galway West
Party	Candidate	FPv%	Count												
Party	Candidate	FPv%	1	2	3	4	5	6	7	8	9	10	11	12	13
Fianna Fáil	Éamon Ó Cuív (Note: Listed on the ballot paper as Cuív, Éamon Ó)	14.1	8,522	8,534	8,566	8,825	8,893	9,017	9,200	11,910					
Sinn Féin	Mairéad Farrell	14.0	8,464	8,486	8,744	8,814	8,904	9,633	10,013	10,340					
Independent	Noel Grealish	13.3	8,043	8,159	8,196	8,541	8,616	9,168	9,302	10,393					
Fine Gael	Hildegarde Naughton	9.3	5,609	5,617	5,645	5,667	5,885	6,027	6,630	7,009	7,366	7,473	7,509	8,536	9,519
Independent	Catherine Connolly	9.0	5,439	5,478	5,693	5,775	6,028	6,661	7,625	8,089	8,722	8,831	8,906	12,486	
Fine Gael	Seán Kyne	8.8	5,284	5,292	5,314	5,345	5,477	5,559	5,829	6,049	6,399	6,461	6,493	7,037	7,574
Fianna Fáil	Ollie Crowe	8.6	5,175	5,180	5,207	5,310	5,384	5,555	5,671						
Green	Pauline O'Reilly	6.0	3,650	3,655	3,766	3,811	4,098	4,230							
Social Democrats	Niall Ó Tuathail	6.0	3,623	3,630	3,761	3,793	4,057	4,313	5,750	5,979	6,281	6,339	6,403		
Independent	Mike Cubbard	4.4	2,676	2,697	2,740	2,802	2,907								
Labour	Níall McNelis	2.6	1,548	1,554	1,577	1,593									
Aontú	Cormac Ó Corcoráin (Note: Listed on the ballot paper as Corcorán, Cormac Ó)	1.8	1,058	1,097	1,118										
Solidarity–PBP	Conor Burke (Note: Burke was a member of Solidarity.)	0.8	495	512											
Solidarity–PBP	Joe Loughnane (Note: Loughnane was a member of People Before Profit, but was suspended on the morning of the election following a report of a violent incident against a woman.)	0.7	437	445											
Independent	Daragh O'Flaherty (Note: Listed on the ballot paper as Flaherty, Daragh O)	0.5	318												
Electorate: 100,695 Valid: 60,341 Spoilt: 423 Quota: 10,057 Turnout: 60,719 (60.3%)

=== 2016 general election ===
2016 general election: Galway West
Party	Candidate	FPv%	Count													
Party	Candidate	FPv%	1	2	3	4	5	6	7	8	9	10	11	12	13	14
Fianna Fáil	Éamon Ó Cuív	14.8	9,539	9,574	9,679	9,701	9,763	10,022	10,079	10,175	11,103					
Independent	Noel Grealish	11.2	7,187	7,208	7,308	7,359	7,522	7,945	8,020	8,461	8,830	9,136	9,186	9,711	11,073	
Fine Gael	Seán Kyne	9.5	6,136	6,148	6,232	6,245	6,292	6,355	6,444	6,506	6,587	7,201	7,209	7,656	8,171	10,590
Sinn Féin	Trevor Ó Clochartaigh	8.9	5,755	5,788	5,815	6,017	6,108	6,162	6,261	6,661	6,721	6,833	6,846	7,468	7,911	8,077
Independent	Catherine Connolly	7.6	4,877	4,909	4,982	5,178	5,325	5,450	5,818	6,330	6,461	7,123	7,138	8,877	9,824	10,239
Fine Gael	John O'Mahony	7.4	4,734	4,744	4,788	4,795	4,859	4,915	4,965	4,996	5,222	5,551	5,591	5,852	6,122	
Fine Gael	Hildegarde Naughton	7.1	4,567	4,582	4,676	4,691	4,759	4,964	5,097	5,175	5,298	6,083	6,094	6,626	7,024	9,129
Fianna Fáil	John Connolly	6.0	3,885	3,901	3,951	3,973	4,019	4,160	4,203	4,351	4,873	5,059	5,304	5,614		
Social Democrats	Niall Ó Tuathail	5.4	3,455	3,488	3,566	3,734	3,803	3,850	4,344	4,674	4,725	5,269	5,278			
Labour	Derek Nolan	5.0	3,220	3,233	3,261	3,300	3,332	3,380	3,624	3,737	3,787					
Fianna Fáil	Mary Hoade	3.4	2,205	2,213	2,248	2,254	2,549	2,636	2,644	2,673						
Independent	Mike Cubbard	3.3	2,122	2,146	2,166	2,309	2,390	2,436	2,533							
Green	Seamus Sheridan	2.5	1,588	1,617	1,667	1,755	1,779	1,813								
Independent	Fidelma Healy Eames	2.2	1,394	1,445	1,594	1,620	1,657									
Independent	James Charity	1.8	1,171	1,181	1,227	1,267										
AAA–PBP	Tommy Holohan	1.6	1,017	1,047	1,071											
Renua	Nicola Daveron	1.5	994	1,025												
Independent	Tommy Roddy	0.4	251													
Direct Democracy	Ruairí O'Neill	0.2	152													
Independent	Patrick Feeney	0.1	22													
Electorate: 103,704 Valid: 64,271 Spoilt: 488 (0.75%) Quota: 10,712 Turnout: 64,759 (62.5%)

=== 2011 general election ===
2011 general election: Galway West
Party	Candidate	FPv%	Count												
Party	Candidate	FPv%	1	2	3	4	5	6	7	8	9	10	11	12	13
Labour	Derek Nolan	12.4	7,489	7,672	8,006	8,266	8,463	8,703	9,119	9,308	9,415	10,431			
Fianna Fáil	Éamon Ó Cuív	12.3	7,441	7,486	7,547	7,649	8,198	8,927	9.035	11,138					
Independent	Noel Grealish	10.3	6,229	6,346	6,396	6,589	6,810	7,116	7,324	7,916	8,312	8,682	8,736	9,811	9,829
Fine Gael	Brian Walsh	8.9	5,425	5,473	5,515	5,644	5,869	5,964	7,008	7,242	7,343	7,491	7,520	10,227	
Fine Gael	Fidelma Healy Eames	8.3	5,046	5,080	5,173	5,290	5,347	5,487	6,542	6,712	6,801	6,990	7,020		
Independent	Catherine Connolly	7.9	4,766	4,973	5,214	5,499	5,603	5,888	6,148	6,390	6,551	8,207	8,375	9,083	9,095
Fine Gael	Seán Kyne	7.5	4,550	4,581	4,630	4,704	4,729	5,741	6,470	6,621	6,705	7,029	7,074	9,020	9,112
Sinn Féin	Trevor Ó Clochartaigh	6.3	3,808	3,927	3,999	4,096	4,141	4,407	4,447	4,588	4,683				
Fine Gael	Hildegarde Naughton	5.9	3,606	3,655	3,745	3,858	3,908	3,993							
Fianna Fáil	Frank Fahey	5.7	3,448	3,474	3,489	3,526	3,833	4,017	4,062						
Independent	Tom Welby	5.4	3,298	3,325	3,345	3,484	3,504								
Fianna Fáil	Michael Crowe	3.0	1,814	1,855	1,870	1,895									
Independent	Eamon Walsh	2.4	1,481	1,581	1,624										
Green	Niall Ó Brolcháin	1.8	1,120	1,153											
Independent	Mike Cubbard	1.4	853												
Independent	Uinseann Holmes	0.3	186												
Independent	Thomas King	0.1	65												
Electorate: 88,840 Valid: 60,625 Spoilt: 643 (1.1%) Quota: 10,105 Turnout: 61,268 (69.0%)

Brian Walsh resigned as a TD on 14 January 2016. The seat remained vacant until the dissolution of the 31st Dáil on 3 February 2016.

=== 2007 general election ===
2007 general election: Galway West
Party	Candidate	FPv%	Count												
Party	Candidate	FPv%	1	2	3	4	5	6	7	8	9	10	11	12	13
Fianna Fáil	Éamon Ó Cuív	17.5	9,645												
Labour	Michael D. Higgins	11.1	6,086	6,090	6,262	6,296	6,609	6,947	7,189	7,447	8,384	10,916			
Fianna Fáil	Frank Fahey	10.6	5,854	5,855	5,965	6,150	6,300	6,481	6,549	7,036	7,234	7,421	7,536	7,914	8,139
Progressive Democrats	Noel Grealish	10.5	5,806	5,812	6,122	6,141	6,196	6,313	6,366	6,940	7,065	7,241	7,377	8,116	9,034
Fine Gael	Pádraic McCormack	9.8	5,419	5,425	5,497	5,513	5,581	5,719	6,474	6,834	7,068	7,370	7,859	11,592	
Fianna Fáil	Michael Crowe	9.0	4,969	4,976	5,115	5,233	5,364	5,652	5,708	5,863	6,117	6,338	6,507	6,842	7,159
Fine Gael	Fidelma Healy Eames	7.1	3,904	3,904	3,960	3,966	4,022	4,249	4,705	4,831	5,051	5,496	6,170		
Green	Niall Ó Brolcháin	5.5	3,026	3,032	3,113	3,124	3,457	3,658	3,754	3,834	4,332				
Independent	Catherine Connolly	3.7	2,006	2,014	2,055	2,066	2,307	2,580	2,631	2,684					
Fine Gael	Seán Kyne	3.5	1,912	1,914	1,929	1,939	1,970	2,033							
Progressive Democrats	Tom Welby	3.4	1,894	1,897	1,986	2,014	2,075	2,119	2,329						
Independent	Margaret Cox	3.1	1,718	1,723	1,795	1,808	1,932								
Sinn Féin	Anne Marie Carroll	3.0	1,629	1,637	1,641	1,652									
Progressive Democrats	Donal Lyons	2.1	1,168	1,169											
Independent	Thomas King	0.1	60												
Electorate: 86,602 Valid: 55,096 Spoilt: 533 (0.9%) Quota: 9,183 Turnout: 55,629 (64.2%)

=== 2002 general election ===
2002 general election: Galway West
Party	Candidate	FPv%	Count															
Party	Candidate	FPv%	1	2	3	4	5	6	7	8	9	10	11	12	13	14	15	16
Fianna Fáil	Éamon Ó Cuív	20.1	9,947															
Fianna Fáil	Frank Fahey	14.6	7,226	7,902	7,903	7,904	7,993	8,120	8,318									
Labour	Michael D. Higgins	10.6	5,213	5,315	5,330	5,343	5,510	5,646	5,772	6,095	6,664	6,682	7,171	7,498	8,151	8,244	10,580	
Fine Gael	Pádraic McCormack	9.6	4,760	4,850	4,853	4,859	5,260	5,318	5,502	5,865	6,001	6,012	6,285	7,623	8,420			
Fianna Fáil	Margaret Cox	6.6	3,269	3,697	3,700	3,704	3,752	3,801	3,870	4,082	4,297	4,314	4,623	4,782	5,244	5,273	5,585	5,906
Progressive Democrats	Noel Grealish	5.5	2,735	2,787	2,789	2,791	2,858	2,876	3,121	3,233	3,315	3,323	4,544	5,098	5,325	5,352	5,684	6,215
Independent	Séamus Walsh	4.9	2,439	2,559	2,573	2,588	2,626	2,742	2,774	2,944	3,154	3,155	3,234	3,328				
Fine Gael	Michael McDonagh	4.6	2,279	2,300	2,301	2,306	2,619	2,632	2,670	2,748	2,808	2,812	2,888					
Green	Niall Ó Brolcháin	4.4	2,193	2,216	2,225	2,241	2,308	2,416	2,450	2,651	3,108	3,111	3,267	3,391	3,749	3,775		
Progressive Democrats	Donal Lyons	3.9	1,935	2,017	2,017	2,026	2,058	2,068	2,545	2,713	2,787	2,798						
Independent	Dana Rosemary Scallon	3.4	1,677	1,727	1,731	1,740	1,812	1,872	1,920									
Sinn Féin	Daniel Callanan	3.0	1,468	1,485	1,492	1,498	1,509	2,166	2,200	2,306								
Progressive Democrats	Declan McDonnell	3.0	1,462	1,479	1,480	1,484	1,499	1,506										
Fine Gael	Fidelma Healy Eames	2.7	1,320	1,340	1,343	1,347												
Sinn Féin	Seán Coistealbha	2.7	1,311	1,373	1,379	1,383	1,397											
Independent	Eileen Manning	0.2	96	97	100													
Independent	Joseph Nulty	0.2	76	77														
Electorate: 82,213 Valid: 49,466 Spoilt: 680 (1.4%) Quota: 8,245 Turnout: 50,146 (61.0%)

=== 1997 general election ===
1997 general election: Galway West
Party	Candidate	FPv%	Count										
Party	Candidate	FPv%	1	2	3	4	5	6	7	8	9	10	11
Fianna Fáil	Frank Fahey	19.3	9,321										
Fianna Fáil	Éamon Ó Cuív	17.3	8,250										
Fine Gael	Pádraic McCormack	15.0	7,221	7,335	7,351	7,392	7,520	7,601	8,495				
Progressive Democrats	Bobby Molloy	12.3	5,914	6,216	6,257	6,330	6,576	6,703	6,840	6,867	7,386	7,672	8,217
Labour	Michael D. Higgins	10.1	4,856	4,942	4,952	5,076	5,145	5,379	5,654	5,759	5,908	7,138	8,456
Fianna Fáil	Margaret Cox	6.1	2,941	3,383	3,450	3,497	3,660	3,905	3,969	3,978	4,939	5,257	5,505
Fine Gael	Pól Ó Foighil	3.8	1,807	1,826	1,836	1,913	1,961	2,009	2,285	2,586	2,822	3,050	
Green	Pat Fitzpatrick	3.4	1,660	1,675	1,677	1,867	1,977	2,295	2,364	2,376	2,434		
Fianna Fáil	Seán O'Neachtain	3.4	1,639	1,888	1,945	1,997	2,064	2,203	2,230	2,235			
Fine Gael	Thomas O'Malley	3.5	1,682	1,699	1,701	1,729	1,762	1,778					
Sinn Féin	Mike Egan	2.5	1,209	1,235	1,240	1,321	1,373						
National Party	Liam Downes	2.0	959	967	969	993							
Independent	Luke 'Ming' Flanagan	1.1	548	553	554								
Natural Law	Maria Ní Dhomhnaill	0.4	205	207	208								
Electorate: 78,064 Valid: 48,212 Spoilt: 400 (0.8%) Quota: 8,036 Turnout: 48,612 (62.3%)

=== 1992 general election ===
1992 general election: Galway West
Party	Candidate	FPv%	Count									
Party	Candidate	FPv%	1	2	3	4	5	6	7	8	9	10
Labour	Michael D. Higgins	17.7	8,910									
Fianna Fáil	Éamon Ó Cuív	16.7	8,430									
Fianna Fáil	Máire Geoghegan-Quinn	13.6	6,844	6,899	6,904	6,916	6,963	7,020	7,165	7,306	7,531	7,728
Fianna Fáil	Frank Fahey	13.5	6,782	6,809	6,811	6,819	6,872	6,896	6,953	7,060	7,299	7,493
Progressive Democrats	Bobby Molloy	13.4	6,749	6,886	6,890	6,913	6,927	7,015	7,131	7,467	7,733	8,276
Fine Gael	Pádraic McCormack	11.5	5,776	5,837	5,841	5,850	5,871	5,923	6,016	6,163	6,406	8,508
Fine Gael	Fintan Coogan Jnr	5.5	2,747	2,807	2,810	2,826	2,837	2,876	2,994	3,224	3,432	
Independent	Darina Costelloe	2.6	1,308	1,327	1,344	1,354	1,392	1,417	1,503	1,683		
Independent	Paddy Lally	2.3	1,151	1,210	1,220	1,249	1,299	1,387	1,456			
Independent	Pól Ó Foighil	1.5	750	762	762	764	784	816				
Democratic Left	Jacqueline O'Dowd	0.8	392	457	464	483	518					
Sinn Féin	Mike Egan	0.7	349	357	357	360						
Independent	John Barry Finnegan	0.3	138	143	144							
Independent	Jim Walsh	0.1	60	63								
Electorate: 79,008 Valid: 50,386 Spoilt: 653 (1.3%) Quota: 8,399 Turnout: 51,039 (64.6%)

=== 1989 general election ===
1989 general election: Galway West
Party	Candidate	FPv%	Count						
Party	Candidate	FPv%	1	2	3	4	5	6	7
Progressive Democrats	Bobby Molloy	18.2	8,917						
Fianna Fáil	Frank Fahey	16.4	8,010	8,054	8,061	8,129	8,177	10,329	
Labour	Michael D. Higgins	15.8	7,727	7,908	7,975	9,130			
Fine Gael	Pádraic McCormack	12.2	5,987	6,118	6,130	6,179	6,331	6,711	6,922
Fianna Fáil	Máire Geoghegan-Quinn	12.1	5,902	5,941	5,949	5,996	6,043	8,315	
Fianna Fáil	Éamon Ó Cuív	11.7	5,733	5,792	5,807	5,853	5,916		
Fine Gael	Fintan Coogan Jnr	10.8	5,297	5,501	5,519	5,723	6,075	6,328	6,557
Workers' Party	James Brick	2.4	1,155	1,585	1,623				
Independent	Dermot Shanley	0.3	127	129					
Independent	Paul O'Connor	0.2	84	87					
Electorate: 77,178 Valid: 49,339 Spoilt: 787 Quota: 8,224 Turnout: 50,126 (64.9%)

=== 1987 general election ===
1987 general election: Galway West
Party	Candidate	FPv%	Count												
Party	Candidate	FPv%	1	2	3	4	5	6	7	8	9	10	11	12	13
Progressive Democrats	Bobby Molloy	17.5	9,216												
Fianna Fáil	Frank Fahey	12.3	6,488	6,501	6,515	6,556	6,575	6,683	6,715	6,875	7,924	8,952			
Fianna Fáil	Mark Killilea Jnr	9.6	5,053	5,065	5,071	5,106	5,116	5,172	5,200	5,331	5,900	6,976	7,044	7,179	7,282
Fianna Fáil	Máire Geoghegan-Quinn	8.7	4,607	4,622	4,650	4,705	4,722	4,792	5,068	5,156	5,419	7,134	7,212	7,365	7,514
Fine Gael	John Donnellan	8.5	4,476	4,495	4,551	4,602	4,916	4,973	5,035	5,502	5,977	6,113	6,116	10,376	
Fine Gael	Fintan Coogan Jnr	8.0	4,206	4,239	4,286	4,395	4,746	4,972	5,084	5,662	5,872	5,986	5,989		
Labour	Michael D. Higgins	7.4	3,878	3,912	4,137	4,375	4,395	5,272	5,632	6,178	6,438	6,747	6,753	7,609	8,939
Fianna Fáil	Éamon Ó Cuív	7.3	3,831	3,848	3,878	3,920	3,943	3,971	4,405	4,628	4,808				
Independent	Michael Fahy	6.0	3,139	3,148	3,158	3,189	3,197	3,257	3,302	3,440					
Progressive Democrats	Michael O'Neill	4.1	2,144	2,387	2,427	2,567	2,638	2,732	2,885						
Independent	Peadar Ó Tuathail	3.3	1,724	1,730	1,783	1,816	1,899	1,926							
Workers' Party	James Brick	3.0	1,567	1,577	1,635	1,731	1,741								
Fine Gael	John O'Malley	1.7	918	924	932	940									
Independent	Mary Duffy	1.6	862	865	925										
Independent	Margaret Sweeney	1.0	511	512											
Independent	Brian Mannion	0.2	101	102											
Independent	Dermot Shanley	0.1	41	41											
Electorate: 77,542 Valid: 52,762 Quota: 8,794 Turnout: 68.0%

=== November 1982 general election ===
November 1982 general election: Galway West
Party	Candidate	FPv%	Count					
Party	Candidate	FPv%	1	2	3	4	5	6
Fianna Fáil	Bobby Molloy	16.7	8,234					
Fine Gael	Fintan Coogan Jnr	13.2	6,521	6,592	6,922	8,634		
Fine Gael	John Donnellan	14.2	7,020	7,085	7,208	7,923	8,275	
Fianna Fáil	Máire Geoghegan-Quinn	11.3	5,583	6,051	6,119	6,364	6,371	8,644
Fianna Fáil	Mark Killilea Jnr	11.2	5,509	5,762	5,844	5,908	5,913	
Fianna Fáil	Frank Fahey	11.1	5,475	5,830	5,927	5,994	6,000	8,625
Labour	Michael D. Higgins	9.0	4,449	4,553	5,556	6,036	6,079	6,566
Fine Gael	Pól Ó Foighil	6.6	3,259	3,279	3,366			
Workers' Party	James Brick	3.6	1,787	1,884				
Fianna Fáil	Gerald Bartley	3.0	1,486					
Electorate: 76,856 Valid: 49,323 Quota: 8,221 Turnout: 64.2%

=== February 1982 general election ===
February 1982 general election: Galway West
Party	Candidate	FPv%	Count						
Party	Candidate	FPv%	1	2	3	4	5	6	7
Fianna Fáil	Bobby Molloy	19.7	9,545						
Fine Gael	John Donnellan	12.6	6,105	6,143	6,194	6,224	8,405		
Fianna Fáil	Frank Fahey	12.4	6,019	6,371	6,470	6,764	6,861	7,240	7,671
Labour	Michael D. Higgins	11.8	5,718	5,847	6,562	6,776	7,330	10,300	
Fianna Fáil	Mark Killilea Jnr	11.6	5,624	5,822	5,857	6,099	6,128	6,340	6,485
Fianna Fáil	Máire Geoghegan-Quinn	8.5	4,139	4,614	4,661	6,377	6,464	6,685	6,881
Fine Gael	Pádraic McCormack	8.1	3,952	3,976	4,014	4,055	5,069		
Fine Gael	Fintan Coogan Jnr	7.7	3,746	3,793	3,938	4,043			
Fianna Fáil	Nicholas O'Connor	5.2	2,513	2,684	2,717				
Sinn Féin The Workers' Party	James Brick	2.5	1,211	1,226					
Electorate: 72,590 Valid: 48,572 Quota: 8,096 Turnout: 66.9%

=== 1981 general election ===
1981 general election: Galway West
Party	Candidate	FPv%	Count							
Party	Candidate	FPv%	1	2	3	4	5	6	7	8
Fianna Fáil	Bobby Molloy	18.9	9,592							
Fianna Fáil	Mark Killilea Jnr	12.5	6,338	6,532	6,590	6,779	6,844	6,911	7,152	7,411
Labour	Michael D. Higgins	12.3	6,226	6,338	7,078	7,185	7,779	8,555		
Fine Gael	John Donnellan	10.0	5,065	5,091	5,149	5,163	5,897	8,019	12,342	
Fianna Fáil	Frank Fahey	9.9	5,049	5,202	5,296	5,473	5,520	5,622	5,845	6,173
Fianna Fáil	Máire Geoghegan-Quinn	9.0	4,549	4,974	5,062	6,875	7,184	7,306	7,487	7,687
Fine Gael	Pádraic McCormack	7.6	3,859	3,884	3,919	3,943	4,502	5,458		
Fine Gael	Henry Comerford	6.8	3,477	3,511	3,656	3,667	4,245			
Fine Gael	Pól Ó Foighil	5.6	2,849	2,874	2,912	3,121				
Fianna Fáil	Nicholas O'Connor	4.9	2,471	2,578	2,604					
Sinn Féin The Workers' Party	James Brick	2.1	1,081	1,095						
Independent	Anthony Coffey	0.6	284	287						
Electorate: 72,590 Valid: 50,840 Quota: 8,474 Turnout: 70.0%

=== 1977 general election ===
1977 general election: Galway West
Party	Candidate	FPv%	Count								
Party	Candidate	FPv%	1	2	3	4	5	6	7	8	9
Fianna Fáil	Bobby Molloy	18.5	7,832	7,902	7,929	8,659					
Fianna Fáil	Máire Geoghegan-Quinn	17.9	7,575	7,647	7,697	8,755					
Fianna Fáil	Bill Loughnane	17.2	7,280	7,397	7,425	7,784	8,051	8,374	8,535		
Labour	Michael D. Higgins	11.7	4,952	5,355	5,453	5,503	5,511	5,848	5,854	5,858	7,397
Fine Gael	John Mannion Jnr	10.2	4,331	4,363	4,756	4,859	4,865	5,360	5,380	5,388	8,520
Fine Gael	Fintan Coogan Snr	7.4	3,136	3,191	3,510	3,547	3,557	5,332	5,334	5,335	
Fine Gael	Toddie Byrne	6.7	2,854	2,889	3,072	3,082	3,082				
Fianna Fáil	Micheál Ó Móráin	5.5	2,333	2,364	2,369						
Fine Gael	Pádraic McCormack	2.7	1,126	1,138							
Sinn Féin The Workers' Party	Anthony Coffey	2.2	926								
Electorate: 61,582 Valid: 42,345 Spoilt: 284 (0.6%) Quota: 8,470 Turnout: 42,629 (69.2%)

=== 1975 by-election ===
Fianna Fáil TD Johnny Geoghegan died on 5 January 1975. A by-election was held to fill the vacancy on 4 March 1975. The seat was won by the Fianna Fáil candidate Máire Geoghegan-Quinn, daughter of the deceased TD.

1975 by-election: Galway West
Party	Candidate	FPv%	Count			
Party	Candidate	FPv%	1	2	3	4
Fianna Fáil	Máire Geoghegan-Quinn	45.3	12,627	12,737	13,466	14,345
Fine Gael	John Mannion Jnr	26.0	7,234	7,291	7,777	12,080
Labour	Michael D. Higgins	18.9	5,269	5,522	6,129	
Independent	Pól Ó Foighil	7.5	2,096	2,231		
Official Sinn Féin	Renée Prendergast	2.4	656			
Electorate: 44,350 Valid: 27,882 Quota: 13,942 Turnout: 62.9%

=== 1973 general election ===
1973 general election: Galway West
Party	Candidate	FPv%	Count							
Party	Candidate	FPv%	1	2	3	4	5	6	7	8
Fianna Fáil	Bobby Molloy	28.3	7,028							
Fianna Fáil	Johnny Geoghegan	19.3	4,782	5,249	5,326	5,370	5,470	6,861		
Fine Gael	Fintan Coogan Snr	13.7	3,410	3,451	3,478	3,550	3,687	3,757	3,798	5,951
Labour	Michael D. Higgins	13.5	3,346	3,384	3,429	3,563	3,881	3,942	3,998	4,637
Fine Gael	John Mannion Jnr	12.7	3,156	3,191	3,340	3,378	3,457	3,677	3,766	
Fianna Fáil	Séamus Kyne	6.3	1,573	1,780	1,834	1,866	1,921			
Independent	Seosamh Ó Tuairisg	2.8	703	715	727	833				
Aontacht Éireann	Irene King	1.7	416	424	452					
Independent	Pádraic Joyce	1.7	411	424						
Electorate: 35,999 Valid: 24,825 Quota: 6,207 Turnout: 68.9%

=== 1969 general election ===
1969 general election: Galway West
Party	Candidate	FPv%	Count							
Party	Candidate	FPv%	1	2	3	4	5	6	7	8
Fianna Fáil	Bobby Molloy	28.3	6,709							
Fianna Fáil	Johnny Geoghegan	20.8	4,923	5,368	5,385	5,402	6,345			
Fine Gael	John Mannion Snr	12.7	3,001	3,028	3,259	3,306	3,351	3,373	3,624	3,990
Fine Gael	Fintan Coogan Snr	12.4	2,942	2,986	3,374	3,469	3,676	3,732	4,217	5,293
Independent	Peadar Mac an Iomaire	6.4	1,522	1,541	1,561	1,669	1,695	1,738		
Labour	Thomas Tierney	6.4	1,519	1,547	1,579	2,457	2,549	2,621	2,904	
Fianna Fáil	Mary Byrne	5.0	1,185	1,374	1,385	1,419				
Labour	Michael D. Higgins	4.9	1,174	1,192	1,225					
Fine Gael	William Cahill	3.1	738	748						
Electorate: 34,173 Valid: 23,713 Quota: 5,929 Turnout: 69.4%

=== 1965 general election ===
1965 general election: Galway West
Party	Candidate	FPv%	Count				
Party	Candidate	FPv%	1	2	3	4	5
Fianna Fáil	Johnny Geoghegan	30.9	6,982				
Fine Gael	Fintan Coogan Snr	22.5	5,081	5,147	5,464	6,489	
Fianna Fáil	Bobby Molloy	14.0	3,167	3,671	3,706	3,957	5,814
Fine Gael	John Mannion Snr	12.4	2,813	2,868	3,419	3,586	4,124
Fianna Fáil	Pádraic Joyce	8.4	1,891	2,553	2,607	2,674	
Labour	Michael Smyth	7.3	1,653	1,668	1,708		
Fine Gael	Michael Walsh	4.5	1,022	1,049			
Electorate: 32,548 Valid: 22,609 Quota: 5,653 Turnout: 69.5%

=== 1961 general election ===
1961 general election: Galway West
Party	Candidate	FPv%	Count				
Party	Candidate	FPv%	1	2	3	4	5
Fianna Fáil	Johnny Geoghegan	23.8	4,917	5,034	5,048	5,628	
Fine Gael	Fintan Coogan Snr	23.5	4,854	5,289			
Fianna Fáil	Gerald Bartley	22.1	4,557	4,680	4,696	4,809	5,001
Fine Gael	Thomas Connolly	9.4	1,948	1,987	2,011	2,379	2,411
Labour	James Cox	8.2	1,693	1,873	1,927	2,205	2,249
Clann na Poblachta	Joseph Ridge	7.9	1,640	1,709	1,724		
Independent	Thomas Powell	5.1	1,053				
Electorate: 32,011 Valid: 20,662 Quota: 5,166 Turnout: 64.6%

=== 1957 general election ===
1957 general election: Galway West
Party	Candidate	FPv%	Count		
Party	Candidate	FPv%	1	2	3
Fianna Fáil	Johnny Geoghegan	24.9	4,966	6,056	
Fine Gael	Fintan Coogan Snr	21.5	4,282	4,662	4,790
Fine Gael	John Mannion Snr	19.3	3,853	3,995	4,065
Fianna Fáil	Gerald Bartley	19.0	3,789	5,134	
Fianna Fáil	Michael Lydon	15.2	3,028		
Electorate: 31,332 Valid: 19,918 Quota: 4,980 Turnout: 63.6%

=== 1954 general election ===
1954 general election: Galway West
Party	Candidate	FPv%	Count				
Party	Candidate	FPv%	1	2	3	4	5
Fine Gael	John Mannion Snr	20.1	4,206	4,243	4,524	4,689	4,798
Fianna Fáil	Gerald Bartley	18.9	3,945	3,967	4,066	5,860	
Fianna Fáil	Johnny Geoghegan	18.8	3,939	3,962	4,083	5,268	
Fianna Fáil	Michael Lydon	15.8	3,299	3,356	3,577		
Fine Gael	Fintan Coogan Snr	14.7	3,066	3,357	4,500	4,754	4,972
Clann na Poblachta	Fursa Walsh	8.7	1,813	2,022			
Labour	John O'Connell	3.1	650				
Electorate: 31,737 Valid: 20,918 Quota: 5,230 Turnout: 65.9%

=== 1951 general election ===
1951 general election: Galway West
Party	Candidate	FPv%	Count					
Party	Candidate	FPv%	1	2	3	4	5	6
Fianna Fáil	Peadar Duignan	21.0	4,481	4,622	4,732	5,130	5,259	5,407
Fianna Fáil	Gerald Bartley	17.8	3,793	3,837	3,885	4,058	4,256	4,351
Fianna Fáil	Michael Lydon	14.4	3,066	3,177	3,311	3,754	3,898	4,083
Fine Gael	John Mannion Snr	13.3	2,832	2,959	3,671	4,079	6,331	
Fine Gael	Martin Mylotte	10.5	2,238	2,468	2,848	3,254		
Labour	John McElhinney	8.8	1,885	2,357	2,701			
Fine Gael	Fintan Coogan Snr	7.4	1,572	1,821				
Clann na Poblachta	Fursa Walsh	6.8	1,457					
Electorate: 33,229 Valid: 21,324 Quota: 5,332 Turnout: 64.2%

=== 1948 general election ===
1948 general election: Galway West
Party	Candidate	FPv%	Count				
Party	Candidate	FPv%	1	2	3	4	5
Fine Gael	Joseph Mongan	21.7	4,635	4,713	4,784	4,791	5,421
Fianna Fáil	Gerald Bartley	21.7	4,600	4,636	6,023		
Fianna Fáil	Michael Lydon	17.9	3,787	3,807	4,424	5,127	5,443
National Labour Party	John McElhinney	15.1	3,205	3,243	3,273	3,280	4,313
Clann na Poblachta	Margaret Ashe	10.7	2,273	2,642	2,668	2,672	
Fianna Fáil	John J. Keane	10.1	2,146	2,152			
Clann na Poblachta	Pádraig Ó Cosgarda	2.6	560				
Electorate: 32,767 Valid: 21,206 Quota: 5,302 Turnout: 64.7%

=== 1944 general election ===
1944 general election: Galway West
Party	Candidate	FPv%	Count		
Party	Candidate	FPv%	1	2	3
Fianna Fáil	Gerald Bartley	24.2	6,078	6,161	7,036
Fine Gael	Joseph Mongan	20.4	5,122	6,374	
Fianna Fáil	Michael Lydon	19.1	4,790	4,843	5,687
Fianna Fáil	John J. Keane	17.0	4,267	4,290	4,625
Independent	Margaret Ashe	12.2	3,054	3,401	
Fine Gael	Brendan Allen	7.2	1,813		
Electorate: 43,385 Valid: 25,124 Quota: 6,282 Turnout: 57.9%

=== 1943 general election ===
1943 general election: Galway West
Party	Candidate	FPv%	Count								
Party	Candidate	FPv%	1	2	3	4	5	6	7	8	9
Fianna Fáil	Gerald Bartley	21.6	5,968	6,019	6,030	6,097	6,689	6,842	6,855	9,130	
Fine Gael	Joseph Mongan	19.3	5,344	5,409	6,040	6,354	6,716	7,230			
Fianna Fáil	Eamon Corbett	13.3	3,693	3,717	3,735	3,746	4,015	4,207	4,225	4,734	6,635
Fianna Fáil	John J. Keane	11.6	3,204	3,227	3,244	3,430	3,535	3,714	3,743		
Labour	Bartley Keane	8.3	2,287	2,496	2,551	2,757	3,356	3,731	3,785	4,111	4,180
Independent	Margaret Ashe	7.9	2,186	2,207	2,246	2,310					
Clann na Talmhan	Patrick Morris	7.3	2,019	2,026	2,047	2,796	2,967				
Clann na Talmhan	Joseph Ridge	6.3	1,733	1,758	1,763						
Fine Gael	William Higgins	2.9	810	814							
Labour	Michael Ó Maoláin	1.6	442								
Electorate: 43,385 Valid: 27,686 Quota: 6,922 Turnout: 63.8%

=== 1940 by-election ===
Fianna Fáil TD Seán Tubridy died on 15 July 1939. A by-election was held to fill the vacancy on 30 May 1940.

1940 by-election: Galway West
Party	Candidate	FPv%	Count
Party	Candidate	FPv%	1
Fianna Fáil	John J. Keane	72.1	14,836
Clann na Talmhan	Michael Donnellan	27.9	5,735
Electorate: 43,091 Valid: 20,571 Quota: 10,286 Turnout: 47.7%

=== 1938 general election ===
1938 general election: Galway West
Party	Candidate	FPv%	Count			
Party	Candidate	FPv%	1	2	3	4
Fianna Fáil	Gerald Bartley	28.1	8,044			
Fianna Fáil	Seán Tubridy	22.2	6,346	6,657	7,018	7,128
Fianna Fáil	Louis O'Dea	18.2	5,204	5,703	6,260	6,571
Fine Gael	Joseph Mongan	14.6	4,172	4,210	4,384	6,980
Fine Gael	Peter Kelly	9.8	2,803	2,834	3,477	
Labour	Michael O'Sullivan	7.2	2,046	2,057		
Electorate: 43,112 Valid: 28,615 Quota: 7,154 Turnout: 66.4%

=== 1937 general election ===
1937 general election: Galway West
Party	Candidate	FPv%	Count		
Party	Candidate	FPv%	1	2	3
Fianna Fáil	Seán Tubridy	28.2	7,274		
Fianna Fáil	Gerald Bartley	23.9	6,179	6,706	
Fianna Fáil	Eamon Corbett	19.8	5,109	5,359	5,525
Fine Gael	Joseph Mongan	15.1	3,909	3,928	6,648
Fine Gael	Peter Kelly	12.9	3,337	3,362	
Electorate: 42,796 Valid: 25,808 Quota: 6,453 Turnout: 60.3%

== See also ==
- Elections in the Republic of Ireland
- Politics of the Republic of Ireland
- List of Dáil by-elections
- List of political parties in the Republic of Ireland
