= Mayor Owens =

Mayor Owens may refer to:

- Bob Owens (businessman) (1921–1999), mayor of Tauranga and Mount Maunganui, New Zealand
- George Owens (mayor), lord mayor of Dublin, Ireland
- Michael Owens (politician), mayor of Mableton, Georgia, United States
- Monique Owens (born 1984), mayor of Eastpointe, Michigan, United States
- Joseph Owens (politician) (1912–1994), mayor of Galway, Ireland
- Sharon Owens, mayor of Syracuse, New York, United States
