= 1975 Galway West by-election =

By-election to the 20th Dáil

- 4 March 1975
- Turnout: 27,882 (62.9%)
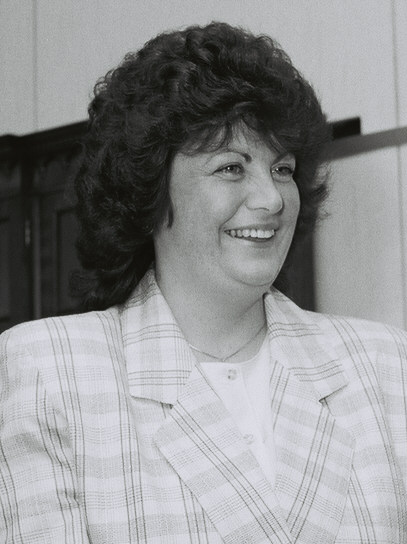

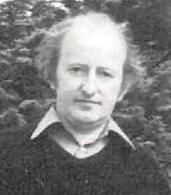
| | | Mannion |
| Nominee | Máire Geoghegan-Quinn | John Mannion Jnr | Michael D. Higgins |
| Party | Fianna Fáil | Fine Gael | Labour |
| First preferences | 12,627 | 7,234 | 5,269 |
| Percentage | 45.3% | 26.0% | 18.9% |
| Final count | 14,345 | 12,080 | – |
TD before election
Johnny Geoghegan
Fianna Fáil
TD after election
Máire Geoghegan-Quinn
Fianna Fáil

A Dáil by-election was held in the constituency of Galway West in Ireland on Tuesday, 4 March 1975, to fill a vacancy in the 20th Dáil. It followed the death of Fianna Fáil Teachta Dála (TD) Johnny Geoghegan on 5 January 1975.

The writ of election was moved by Fianna Fáil TD Patrick Lalor on 11 February 1975 and was agreed by the Dáil.

The by-election was won by the Fianna Fáil candidate Máire Geoghegan-Quinn, daughter of the deceased TD, Johnny Geoghegan.

It was held on the same day as the 1975 Galway North-East by-election. Both by-elections were won by Fianna Fáil candidates.

== Result ==
1975 Galway West by-election
| Party | Candidate | FPv% | Count | | | |
| Party | Candidate | FPv% | 1 | 2 | 3 | 4 |
|---|---|---|---|---|---|---|
| Fianna Fáil | Máire Geoghegan-Quinn | 45.3 | 12,627 | 12,737 | 13,466 | 14,345 |
| Fine Gael | John Mannion Jnr | 26.0 | 7,234 | 7,291 | 7,777 | 12,080 |
| Labour | Michael D. Higgins | 18.9 | 5,269 | 5,522 | 6,129 | |
| Independent | Pól Ó Foighil | 7.5 | 2,096 | 2,231 | | |
| Official Sinn Féin | Renée Prendergast | 2.4 | 656 | | | |
Electorate: 44,350 Valid: 27,882 Quota: 13,942 Turnout: 62.9%
