= Margaret Cox =

Irish politician (born 1963)

Senator
- In office 17 September 1997 – 13 September 2007
- Constituency: Industrial and Commercial Panel

Personal details
- Born: 24 September 1963 (age 62) Galway, Ireland
- Party: Fianna Fáil

Margaret Cox (born 24 September 1963) is an Irish former politician and Senator.

== Electoral history ==
She entered politics having been co-opted onto the Galway City Council in 1995, following the death of her father Tom Cox. At the 1997 general election she was an unsuccessful Fianna Fáil candidate for Dáil Éireann for Galway West, but was then elected to the 21st Seanad by the Industrial and Commercial Panel. At the 1999 local elections, she was elected to Galway City Council, topping the poll in her electoral area.

Cox was unsuccessful again in Galway West at the 2002 general election, her share of the first-preference vote having increased only marginally. However, the Industrial and Commercial Panel returned her to the 22nd Seanad.

After the abolition of the dual mandate, she did not contest the 2004 local elections. Her brother Tom Cox stood for election to Galway City Council in her place, but was narrowly beaten by the Green Party candidate, Niall Ó Brolcháin.

== Political career ==
In the 21st Seanad (1997–2002), Cox was government spokesperson in the Seanad on Enterprise, Trade and Employment. In the 22nd Seanad, Taoiseach Bertie Ahern appointed her as government spokesperson on Social, Community and Family Affairs.

She did not go forward for selection at the Fianna Fáil convention for Galway West for the 2007 general election and resigned from the party in April 2007, citing dissatisfaction with Government delivery on its promises for Galway and the west of Ireland. She unsuccessfully contested the 2007 general election as an independent and announced she would not be seeking re-election to Seanad Éireann.
