= Máire Geoghegan-Quinn =

Irish former politician (born 1950)

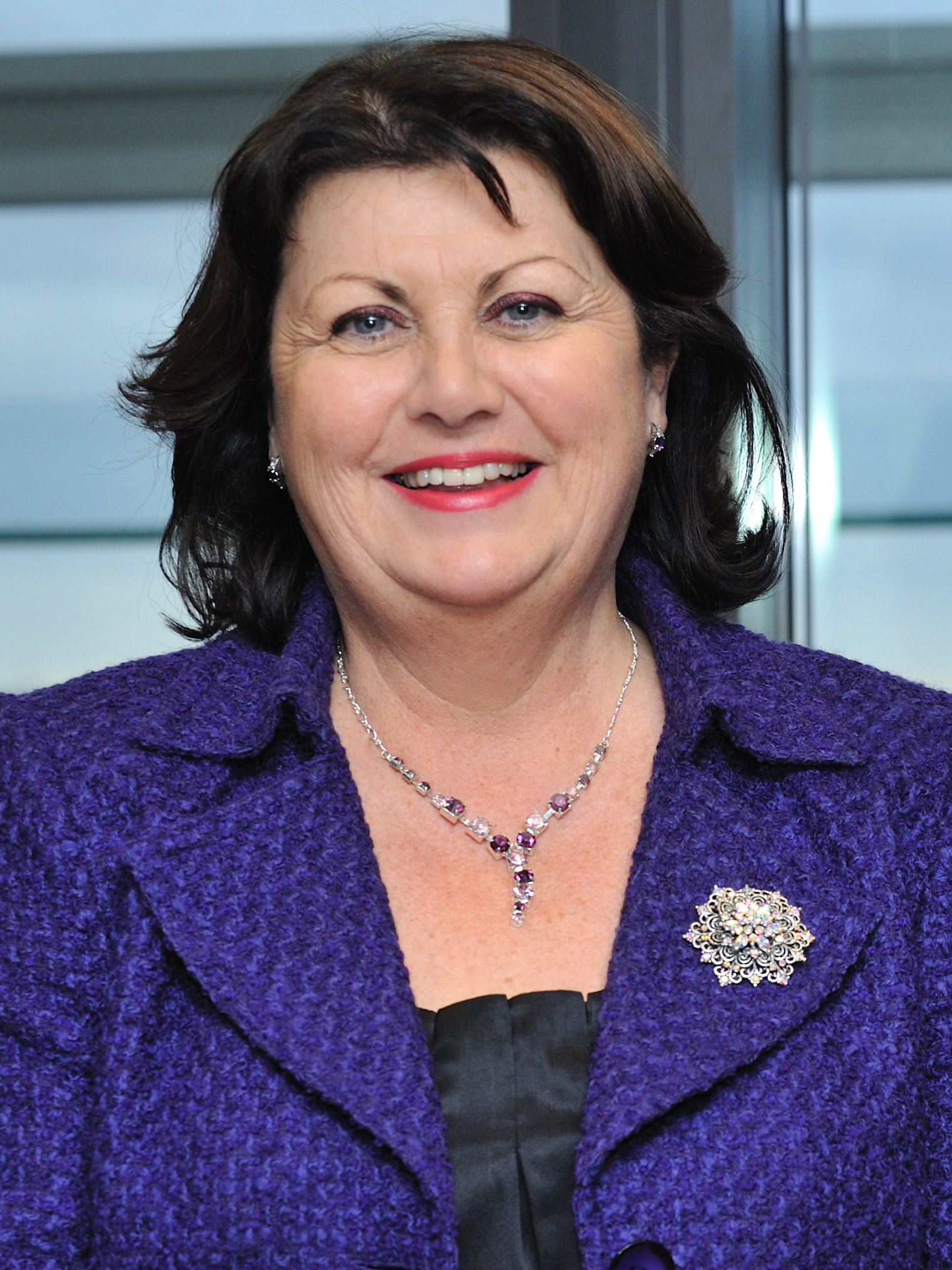
- Geoghegan-Quinn in 2009

European Commissioner for Research, Innovation and Science
- In office 9 February 2010 – 1 November 2014
- President: José Manuel Barroso
- Preceded by: Janez Potočnik (Science and Research)
- Succeeded by: Carlos Moedas (Research, Science and Innovation)

Member of the European Court of Auditors
- In office 1 March 2000 – 9 February 2010
- Preceded by: Barry Desmond
- Succeeded by: Eoin O'Shea

Minister for Equality and Law Reform
- In office 18 November 1994 – 15 December 1994
- Taoiseach: Albert Reynolds
- Preceded by: Mervyn Taylor
- Succeeded by: Mervyn Taylor

Minister for Justice
- In office 4 January 1993 – 15 December 1994
- Taoiseach: Albert Reynolds
- Preceded by: Pádraig Flynn
- Succeeded by: Nora Owen

Minister for Tourism, Transport and Communications
- In office 11 February 1992 – 12 January 1993
- Taoiseach: Albert Reynolds
- Preceded by: Séamus Brennan
- Succeeded by: Charlie McCreevy

Minister of State
- 1987–1991: Taoiseach
- Mar.–Dec. 1982: Education

Minister for the Gaeltacht
- In office 11 December 1979 – 30 June 1981
- Taoiseach: Charles Haughey
- Preceded by: Denis Gallagher
- Succeeded by: Paddy O'Toole

Minister of State
- 1978–1979: Industry, Commerce and Energy

Parliamentary Secretary
- 1977–1978: Industry and Commerce

Teachta Dála
- In office March 1975 – June 1997
- Constituency: Galway West

Personal details
- Born: Máire Geoghegan; 5 September 1950 (age 76) Carna, County Galway, Ireland
- Party: Fianna Fáil
- Spouse: John Quinn (m. 1988)
- Children: 2
- Parent: Johnny Geoghegan (father)
- Education: Carysfort College

Máire Geoghegan-Quinn (/ˈmɑːrə ˈɡeɪɡən ... /; née Geoghegan; born 5 September 1950) is an Irish former Fianna Fáil politician who served as a European Commissioner from 2010 to 2014, and as a cabinet minister in various portfolios at times between 1979 and 1994. She was notable as the first female minister of state on her appointment in 1977, and as the first female cabinet minister since independence on her appointment in 1979. She served as a Teachta Dála (TD) for Galway West from 1975 to 1997.

== Early and personal life ==
Máire Geoghegan was born in Carna, County Galway, in September 1950. She was educated at Coláiste Muire, Tourmakeady, in County Mayo and at Carysfort College in Blackrock, Dublin, from where she qualified as a teacher. She is married to John Quinn, with whom she has two children. Her novel The Green Diamond, about four young women sharing a house in Dublin in the 1960s, was published in 1996.

Geoghegan-Quinn was awarded an honorary doctorate of Laws (LLD) by NUI Galway in June 2014.

== Political career ==
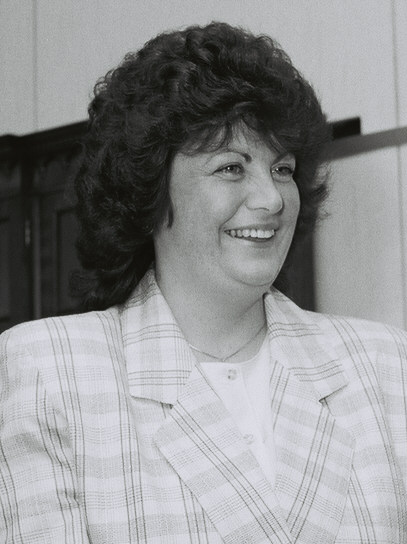
Geoghegan-Quinn in 1989

Her father, Johnny Geoghegan, was a Fianna Fáil TD for Galway West from 1954 until his death in 1975. His daughter successfully contested the subsequent by-election. From 1977 to 1979, she worked as Parliamentary Secretary (junior minister) at the Department of Industry, Commerce and Energy. She served as a member of Galway City Council from 1985 to 1991.

Geoghegan-Quinn supported Charles Haughey in the 1979 Fianna Fáil leadership election and was subsequently appointed to the cabinet post of Minister for the Gaeltacht. She became the first woman to hold an Irish cabinet post since Countess Markievicz had served as Minister for Labour from 1919 to 1921 in the Dáil Ministry during the First Dáil, and the first since the establishment of the Irish Free State in 1922.

In 1982, she was appointed Minister of State at the Department of Education. Her tenure was short because the 23rd Dáil lasted only 279 days, and a Fine Gael–Labour Party coalition was formed after the November 1982 general election. In opposition, she became chair of the first Joint Committee on Women's Rights in 1983 and a member of the Joint Committee on Marriage Breakdown.

When Fianna Fáil returned to power after the 1987 general election, she became Minister of State at the Department of the Taoiseach. She had expected a senior government position, and was disappointed. She resigned in 1991, in opposition to Charles Haughey's leadership of the party. The following year Albert Reynolds, whom she now backed for the leadership, became Taoiseach and Fianna Fáil leader. For her loyalty to Reynolds, she was appointed Minister for Tourism, Transport and Communications.

=== Minister for Justice ===
Geoghegan-Quinn became Minister for Justice in 1993, and was also briefly acting Minister for Equality and Law Reform in late 1994, following the resignation of Labour Party Minister Mervyn Taylor from Reynolds' coalition government.

In early 1993, as Minister for Justice, Geoghegan-Quinn pledged to urgently decriminalise homosexuality, responding to threats that Ireland could face suspension from the Council of Europe if it failed to comply with the European Convention on Human Rights. This move came five years after Senator David Norris secured a landmark European Court ruling against Ireland's Victorian-era laws, originally enacted under British rule. Confidential State Archive documents revealed in 2023 that by May 1993, Geoghegan-Quinn had prioritised draft legislation, aligning with the new coalition government's Programme for a Partnership Government. The draft bill aimed to be published within the parliamentary term. Activists from across Europe, notably from Sweden, engaged with Irish authorities, warning against repeating Britain's error of introducing discriminatory unequal ages of consent. Internal government memos outlined three legislative paths: minimal changes to satisfy European demands; adopting the British model; or fully repealing outdated statutes in favour of comprehensive new legislation. Ultimately, the government pursued full decriminalisation.

When Reynolds resigned as leader of Fianna Fáil in November 1994, Geoghegan-Quinn was seen as his preferred successor in the position. In the resulting leadership election she stood against Bertie Ahern; a win would have made her the first female Taoiseach. On the day of the vote, however, she withdrew from the contest "in the interests of party unity". It was reported that she had the support of only 15 members of the 66-strong parliamentary party.

=== Retirement from national politics ===
At the 1997 general election she retired from politics, citing privacy issues, after details about her 17-year-old son's expulsion from school appeared in the newspapers. "If his mother had been a homemaker, an architect or a businesswoman, this simply would not have happened", she commented. Other reports suggested that she saw her prospects for promotion under Ahern as poor, and a weak showing in constituency opinion polls indicated her seat could be in danger. She became a non-executive director of Aer Lingus, a member of the board of the Declan Ganley-owned Ganley Group, and wrote a column for The Irish Times.

=== European politics ===
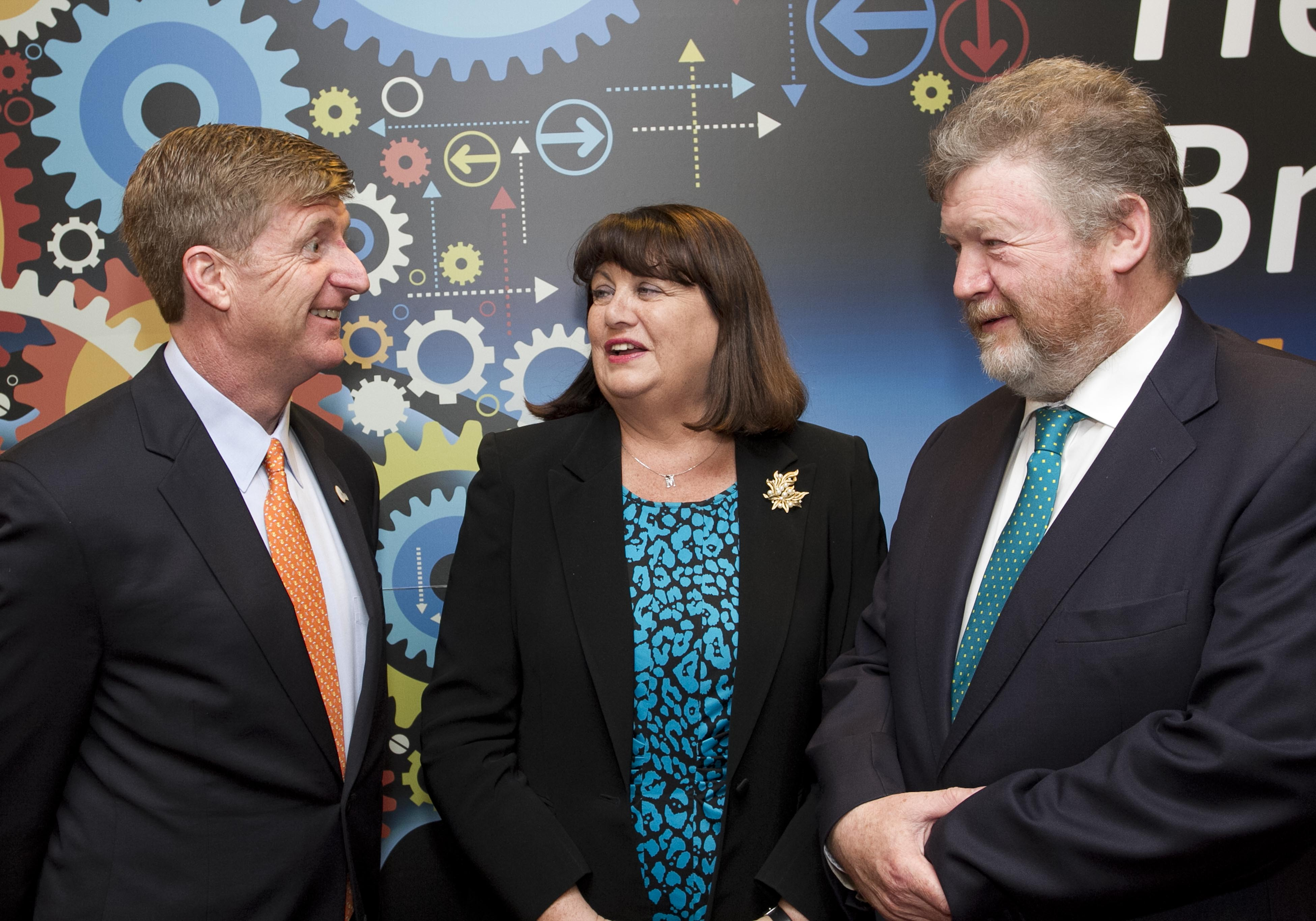
Healthy Brain Healthy Europe Conference 2013: (Left to right) Patrick Kennedy, Geoghegan-Quinn, and James Reilly

Geoghegan-Quinn was appointed to the European Court of Auditors in 1999, replacing former Labour Party politician and Minister Barry Desmond. She was appointed for a second term at the Court of Auditors in March 2006, and resigned on 9 February 2010.

She was nominated in November 2009 by the Taoiseach Brian Cowen to become Ireland's European Commissioner, and was subsequently allocated the Research, Innovation and Science portfolio.

In April 2010, after numerous calls were made over several days for Geoghegan-Quinn to surrender her pensions as an Irish former politician (which were worth over €104,000) while she remained in a paid public office, she did so.

In July 2015, it was announced that she would chair an independent panel to examine issues of gender equality among Irish higher education staff.

In March 2021, NUI Galway announced her appointment as chairperson of Údarás na hOllscoile, the university's governing authority, on a four-year term until 2025.

== Political views ==
In the early 1990s, Geoghegan-Quinn was considered one of the "socially liberal elements" within Fianna Fáil due to her support of both the 1992 X-Case referendums and gay law reform (Sexual Offences Bill 1993).

Honorary titles
Preceded by John Bruton	Baby of the Dáil; Mar.–Nov. 1975	Succeeded by Enda Kenny
Political offices
Preceded by John Bruton	Parliamentary Secretary to the Minister for Industry, Commerce and Energy; 1977–1978	Succeeded by Herself as Minister of State for Industry and Commerce
Preceded by Herself as Parliamentary Secretary to the Minister for Industry and Commerce	Minister of State for Industry and Commerce; 1978–1979	Succeeded by Ray Burke
Preceded by Denis Gallagher	Minister for the Gaeltacht; 1979–1981	Succeeded by Paddy O'Toole
Preceded by Michael Keating	Minister of State for Youth Affairs and Sport; 1982	Succeeded by Donal Creed
New office	Minister of State for Co-ordination of Government Policy and EC Matters; 1987–1991	Succeeded by Michael P. Kitt
Preceded by Séamus Brennan	Minister for Tourism, Transport and Communications; 1992–1993	Succeeded by Charlie McCreevy
Preceded by Pádraig Flynn	Minister for Justice; 1993–1994	Succeeded by Nora Owen
Preceded by Mervyn Taylor	Minister for Equality and Law Reform; 1994	Succeeded by Mervyn Taylor
Preceded by Charlie McCreevy	Irish European Commissioner; 2010–2014	Succeeded by Phil Hogan
Preceded by Janez Potočnik as European Commissioner for Science and Research	European Commissioner for Research, Innovation and Science; 2010–2014	Succeeded by Carlos Moedas as European Commissioner for Research, Science and Innovation

Dáil	Election	Deputy (Party)	Deputy (Party)	Deputy (Party)	Deputy (Party)	Deputy (Party)
9th	1937	Gerald Bartley (FF)	Joseph Mongan (FG)	Seán Tubridy (FF)	3 seats 1937–1977	
10th	1938	Gerald Bartley (FF)	Joseph Mongan (FG)	Seán Tubridy (FF)	3 seats 1937–1977	
10th	1940 by-election	Gerald Bartley (FF)	Joseph Mongan (FG)	John J. Keane (FF)	3 seats 1937–1977	
11th	1943	Gerald Bartley (FF)	Joseph Mongan (FG)	Eamon Corbett (FF)	3 seats 1937–1977	
12th	1944	Gerald Bartley (FF)	Joseph Mongan (FG)	Michael Lydon (FF)	3 seats 1937–1977	
13th	1948	Gerald Bartley (FF)	Joseph Mongan (FG)	Michael Lydon (FF)	3 seats 1937–1977	
14th	1951	Gerald Bartley (FF)	John Mannion Snr (FG)	Peadar Duignan (FF)	3 seats 1937–1977	
15th	1954	Gerald Bartley (FF)	Fintan Coogan Snr (FG)	Johnny Geoghegan (FF)	3 seats 1937–1977	
16th	1957	Gerald Bartley (FF)	Fintan Coogan Snr (FG)	Johnny Geoghegan (FF)	3 seats 1937–1977	
17th	1961	Gerald Bartley (FF)	Fintan Coogan Snr (FG)	Johnny Geoghegan (FF)	3 seats 1937–1977	
18th	1965	Bobby Molloy (FF)	Fintan Coogan Snr (FG)	Johnny Geoghegan (FF)	3 seats 1937–1977	
19th	1969	Bobby Molloy (FF)	Fintan Coogan Snr (FG)	Johnny Geoghegan (FF)	3 seats 1937–1977	
20th	1973	Bobby Molloy (FF)	Fintan Coogan Snr (FG)	Johnny Geoghegan (FF)	3 seats 1937–1977	
20th	1975 by-election	Bobby Molloy (FF)	Fintan Coogan Snr (FG)	Máire Geoghegan-Quinn (FF)	3 seats 1937–1977	
21st	1977	Bobby Molloy (FF)	John Mannion Jnr (FG)	Máire Geoghegan-Quinn (FF)	Bill Loughnane (FF)	4 seats 1977–1981
22nd	1981	Bobby Molloy (FF)	John Donnellan (FG)	Máire Geoghegan-Quinn (FF)	Mark Killilea Jnr (FF)	Michael D. Higgins (Lab)
23rd	1982 (Feb)	Bobby Molloy (FF)	John Donnellan (FG)	Máire Geoghegan-Quinn (FF)	Frank Fahey (FF)	Michael D. Higgins (Lab)
24th	1982 (Nov)	Bobby Molloy (FF)	John Donnellan (FG)	Máire Geoghegan-Quinn (FF)	Frank Fahey (FF)	Fintan Coogan Jnr (FG)
25th	1987	Bobby Molloy (PDs)	John Donnellan (FG)	Máire Geoghegan-Quinn (FF)	Frank Fahey (FF)	Michael D. Higgins (Lab)
26th	1989	Bobby Molloy (PDs)	Pádraic McCormack (FG)	Máire Geoghegan-Quinn (FF)	Frank Fahey (FF)	Michael D. Higgins (Lab)
27th	1992	Bobby Molloy (PDs)	Pádraic McCormack (FG)	Máire Geoghegan-Quinn (FF)	Éamon Ó Cuív (FF)	Michael D. Higgins (Lab)
28th	1997	Bobby Molloy (PDs)	Pádraic McCormack (FG)	Frank Fahey (FF)	Éamon Ó Cuív (FF)	Michael D. Higgins (Lab)
29th	2002	Noel Grealish (PDs)	Pádraic McCormack (FG)	Frank Fahey (FF)	Éamon Ó Cuív (FF)	Michael D. Higgins (Lab)
30th	2007	Noel Grealish (PDs)	Pádraic McCormack (FG)	Frank Fahey (FF)	Éamon Ó Cuív (FF)	Michael D. Higgins (Lab)
31st	2011	Noel Grealish (Ind.)	Brian Walsh (FG)	Seán Kyne (FG)	Éamon Ó Cuív (FF)	Derek Nolan (Lab)
32nd	2016	Noel Grealish (Ind.)	Hildegarde Naughton (FG)	Seán Kyne (FG)	Éamon Ó Cuív (FF)	Catherine Connolly (Ind.)
33rd	2020	Noel Grealish (Ind.)	Hildegarde Naughton (FG)	Mairéad Farrell (SF)	Éamon Ó Cuív (FF)	Catherine Connolly (Ind.)
34th	2024	Noel Grealish (Ind.)	Hildegarde Naughton (FG)	Mairéad Farrell (SF)	John Connolly (FF)	Catherine Connolly (Ind.)
34th	2026 by-election	Noel Grealish (Ind.)	Hildegarde Naughton (FG)	Mairéad Farrell (SF)	John Connolly (FF)	Seán Kyne (FG)
