= Pól Ó Foighil =

Irish politician (1928–2005)

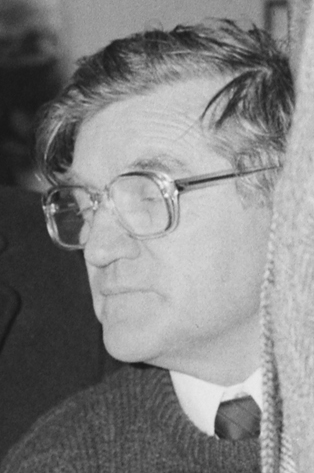
- Ó Foighil in 1989

Senator
- In office 1 November 1989 – 17 February 1993
- Constituency: Labour Panel

Galway County Councillor
- In office 1999–2004
- In office 1979–1985
- Constituency: Connemara

Personal details
- Born: 1 June 1928 County Tipperary, Ireland
- Died: 21 March 2005 (aged 76) Galway, Ireland
- Party: Fine Gael
- Spouse: Chrissie Nic Eoin
- Children: 7
- Education: University College Galway

Pól Ó Foighil (1 June 1928 – 21 March 2005) was an Irish politician and activist for Irish-speaking, coastal and island communities. A teacher turned co-operative manager, he was an active member of the Fine Gael party, and as a long-serving councillor he was the party's only elected representative in the Connemara Gaeltacht for two decades. He also served as a senator from 1989 to 1993.

== Early life and family ==
Ó Foighil was born in Thurles, County Tipperary, and was educated by the Christian Brothers in Thurles and at University College Galway (UCG). His first job was as a teacher in the Cois Fharraige area of south Connemara, and he settled in Inverin. He married Chrissie Nic Eoin, and they had seven children.

One of their four sons, Éanna, a medical student at UCG, committed suicide in 1982. Ó Foighil later spoke on RTÉ television about the impact of suicide on families.

== Activism ==
Ó Foighil's first community development effort was the establishment of group schemes for water supply, leading to the nickname "fear an uisce". He went on establishing Irish-language summer colleges in Connemara, and to develop co-operatives in Connemara, the Aran Islands, and Inishbiggle.

As manager of the co-op on Inis Meáin, he supervised the construction of a desalination plant on the island, and of a controversial wind farm. The environmentalist and author Tim Robinson opposed the wind turbines, and was accused by Ó Foighil of "giving vent to confrontational heritage attitudes" and of being "hell bent" on the depopulation of Inis Meáin". He also campaigned for a cable-car to link the island of Inishbiggle in County Mayo with the neighbouring Achill Island. Inishbiggle had no ferry service, and the short crossing to the island was frequently impassable due to poor weather, with result that families had to leave the island so that their children could attend school. The government agreed to fund a cable car, but in December 2005 the plan was cancelled in favour of improved piers.

== Political career ==
His first political contest was as an independent candidate at the by-election in 1975 in the Galway West constituency, when he won 7.5% of the votes. In 1979, he joined Fine Gael, and stood as Fine Gael candidate at the 1979 local elections, winning seats both on Galway County Council and on Údarás na Gaeltachta. He stood unsuccessfully again for Dáil Éireann at the 1981, November 1982 and 1992 general elections.

In 1989 he was elected to the 19th Seanad on the Labour Panel, serving until 1993. He caused controversy in the Seanad by insisting on wearing the traditional Connemara 'báinín' jacket, and by changing his name to Pól 'Báinín' Ó Foighil. He also fought unsuccessfully to have legislation and official documents made available to him in the Irish language, which under the Constitution of Ireland is the first official language.

As a councillor, Ó Foighil successfully tabled a proposal to the draft County Galway Development Plan 2003–2009 that planning permission in Gaeltacht areas outside the city would be given only to applicants fluent in Irish in order to reduce Irish language decline. The proposal was supported by An Taisce and the Minister for Community, Rural and Gaeltacht Affairs, Eamon Ó Cuív. However, it received a hostile response from some members of the public and in the media.

Ó Foighil's proposal was diluted before the development plan was adopted. The final plan required a "language impact statement" only for developments of more than one dwelling. It stated that "Permission will only be granted where the Authority is satisfied that the effect of the development will be beneficial to the usage of the language in the area, if permitted."

The requirements were criticised by Sunday Times columnists Liam Fay and Dara Flynn. Fay dismissed the language rule as an "act of political piety". Flynn cited a developer who stated that the requirement meant that 12 of 23 apartments in his development in the Gaeltacht area of Bruach na hAbhann in An Spidéal were to be reserved for Irish speakers and that this in turn meant that he had to charge a lower price for his apartments. Flynn also cited the case of the son of a returned emigrant who had difficulty buying an apartment in a Gaeltacht area because he didn't speak Irish.

Ó Foighil unsuccessfully sought a nomination to run as a Fine Gael candidate in the 2002 general election. He had been told by party official Finbarr Fitzpatrick that he was too old, but put his name forward at the selection convention anyway. According to Pádraic McCormack TD, Ó Foighil challenged Fitzpatrick to 20 press ups, and told the convention that his hair was his own, his teeth were his own and that other parts of his anatomy were working very well, too.

He died on 21 March 2005, aged 76. He had resigned from Galway County Council and Údarás na Gaeltachta in 2004, but had been intending to run as an independent candidate in the 2005 elections to the Údarás.

== Legacy ==
Ó Foighil is the subject of the 2011 TG4/Broadcasting Authority of Ireland funded documentary film, An Tarbh, by Mac Dara Ó Curraidhín.
