= 1951 Irish general election =

Election to the 14th Dáil

- 30 May 1951

147 seats in Dáil Éireann (Note: Including Frank Fahy (FF), returned automatically for Galway South as outgoing Ceann Comhairle, under Art. 16.6 of the Constitution and the Electoral (Chairman of Dáil Éireann) Act 1937.) 74 seats needed for a majority
- Turnout: 75.3% ▲1.1 pp
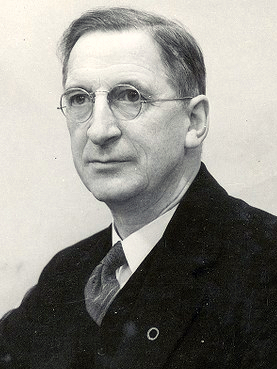

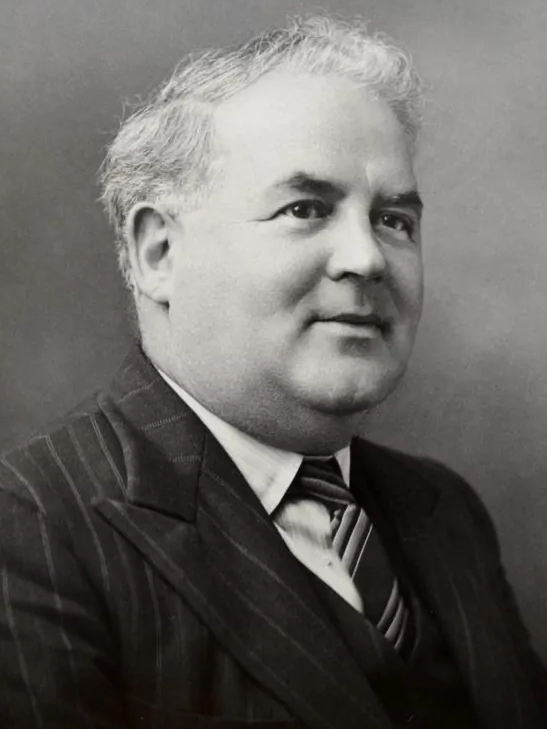

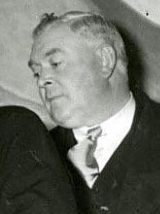

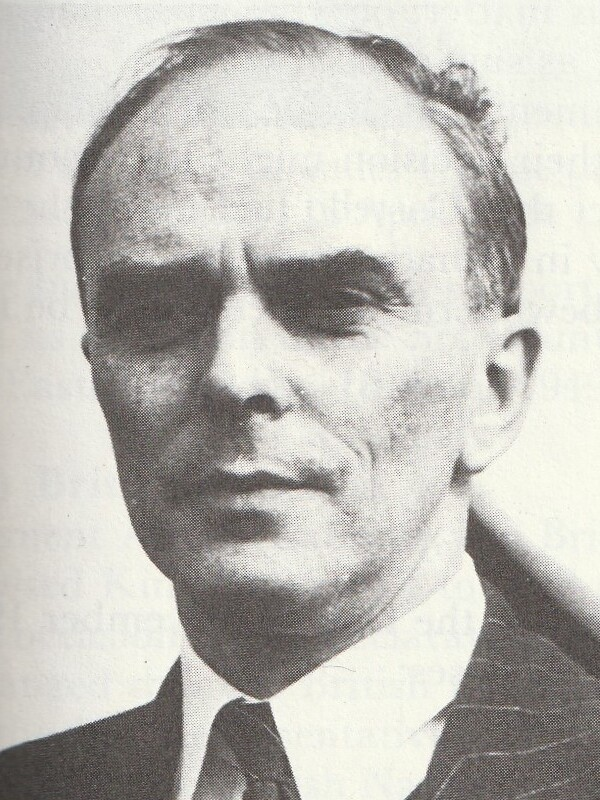
	First party	Second party	Third party
Leader	Éamon de Valera	Richard Mulcahy	William Norton
Party	Fianna Fáil	Fine Gael	Labour
Leader since	26 March 1926	1944	1932
Leader's seat	Clare	Tipperary South	Kildare
Last election	68 seats, 41.9%	31 seats, 19.8%	14 seats, 11.3% (Nat. Lab.: 5 seats, 2.6%)
Seats won	69	40	16
Seat change	▲1	▲9	▼3 (Note: The Labour Party and the National Labour Party had reunited since the previous election. The figures for the Labour Party are compared to the two parties' combined totals in the previous election.)
Popular vote	616,212	349,922	151,828
Percentage	46.3%	25.8%	11.4%
Swing	▲4.4 pp	▲6.0 pp	▲0.1 pp
	Fourth party	Fifth party
Leader	Joseph Blowick	Seán MacBride
Party	Clann na Talmhan	Clann na Poblachta
Leader since	1944	1946
Leader's seat	Mayo South	Dublin South-West
Last election	10 seats, 5.5%	10 seats, 13.3%
Seats won	6	2
Seat change	▼4	▼8
Popular vote	38,872	54,210
Percentage	2.9%	4.1%
Swing	▼2.6 pp	▼9.2 pp
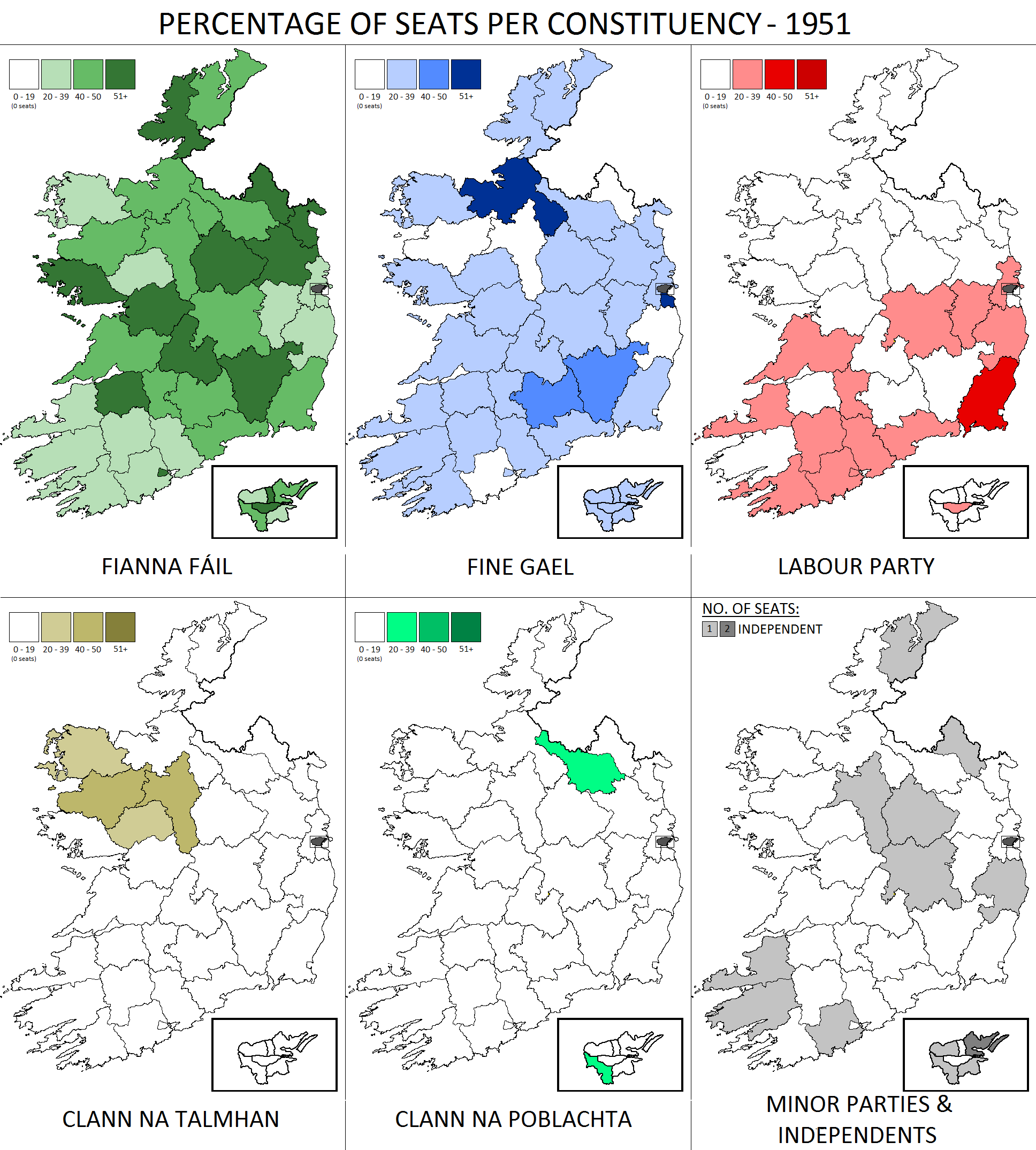
Taoiseach before election
John A. Costello
Fine Gael
Taoiseach after election
Éamon de Valera
Fianna Fáil

The 1951 Irish general election to the 14th Dáil was held on Wednesday, 30 May following the dissolution of the 13th Dáil on 7 May by President Seán T. O'Kelly on the request of Taoiseach John A. Costello. The general election took place in 40 Dáil constituencies throughout Ireland for 147 seats in Dáil Éireann, the house of representatives of the Oireachtas.

This election was the first election since the declaration of the Republic of Ireland on 18 April 1949 under the terms of The Republic of Ireland Act 1948, which forced Ireland's withdrawal from the British Commonwealth.

The 14th Dáil met at Leinster House on 13 June to nominate the Taoiseach for appointment by the president and to approve the appointment of a new government of Ireland. Costello failed to secure a majority, and Éamon de Valera was appointed Taoiseach, forming the 6th government of Ireland, a single-party minority Fianna Fáil government.

== Campaign ==
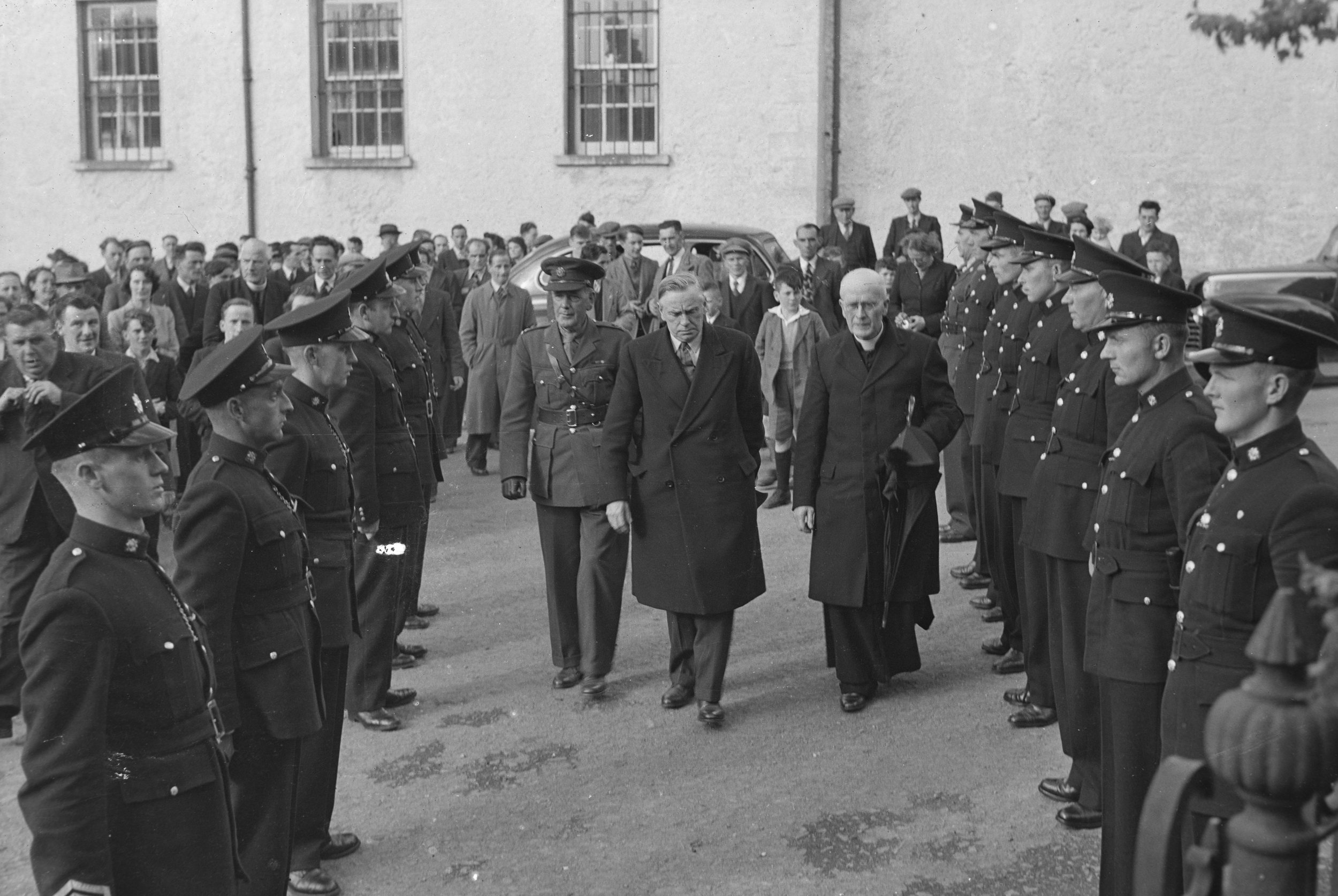
Taoiseach John A. Costello inspects ranks of the Gárda Síochána in Glenties during the 1951 campaign

The 1951 general election was caused by a number of crises within the first inter-party government, most notably the Mother and Child Scheme. While the affair – which saw the resignation of the Minister for Health, Noël Browne – was not entirely to blame for the collapse of the government, it added to the disagreement between the various political parties. There were other problems facing the country, such as rising prices and balance-of-payments problems. Two farmer TDs withdrew their support for the government because of rising milk prices.

The coalition parties fought the general election on their record over the previous three years, while Fianna Fáil argued strongly against coalition governments.

== Result ==
Election to the 14th Dáil – 30 May 1951
Party	Leader	Seats	±	% of seats	First pref. votes	% FPv	±%
Fianna Fáil	Éamon de Valera	69	+1	46.9	616,212	46.3	+4.4
Fine Gael	Richard Mulcahy	40	+9	27.2	349,922	25.8	+6.0
Labour	William Norton	16	–3	10.9	151,828	11.4	+2.7
Clann na Talmhan	Joseph Blowick	6	–1	4.1	38,872	2.9	–2.7
Clann na Poblachta	Seán MacBride	2	–8	1.4	54,210	4.1	–9.1
Irish Workers' League	Michael O'Riordan	0	New	0	295	0.0	–
Independent	N/A	14	+3	9.5	127,234	9.6	+2.4
Spoilt votes					12,043	—N/a	—N/a
Total		147	0	100	1,350,616	100	—N/a
Electorate/Turnout					1,785,144	75.7	—N/a

=== Voting summary ===
First preference vote
Fianna Fáil	46.3%
Fine Gael	25.8%
Labour	11.4%
Clann na Poblachta	4.1%
Clann na Talmhan	2.9%
Others	0.0%
Independent	9.6%

=== Seats summary ===
Dáil seats
Fianna Fáil	46.9%
Fine Gael	27.2%
Labour	10.9%
Clann na Talmhan	4.1%
Clann na Poblachta	1.4%
Independent	9.5%

== Government formation ==
The election result was inconclusive. Fianna Fáil's support increased by 61,000 votes; however, the party only gained one additional seat. The coalition parties had mixed fortunes. Fine Gael were the big winners increasing to forty seats. The Labour Party had reunited in 1950, when the National Labour Party had merged back into the party but in spite of this, the party lost seats. Clann na Poblachta was the big loser of the election. Three years earlier the party had been a big political threat but now the party was shattered.

Fianna Fáil did not have enough seats to govern alone. However, the party was able to form a minority government with the support of Noël Browne, the sacked Minister for Health, and other Independent deputies.

== Changes in membership ==
=== First-time TDs ===
- Philip Brady
- Joseph Brennan
- Patrick Cawley
- Declan Costello
- Patrick Crowe
- Liam Cunningham
- Percy Dockrell
- Peadar Duignan
- Anthony Esmonde
- John Fanning
- Michael ffrench-O'Carroll
- Seán Flanagan
- Colm Gallagher
- James Hession
- Patrick Hillery
- John Lynch
- Peadar Maher
- John Mannion Snr
- Michael Pat Murphy
- William Murphy
- Denis J. O'Sullivan

=== Re-elected TDs ===
- Laurence Walsh

=== Defeated TDs ===
- Mick Fitzpatrick
- John Friel
- Patrick Gorry
- James Kilroy
- Michael Lydon
- Michael Óg McFadden
- Martin O'Sullivan
- Robert Ryan

=== Retiring TDs ===
- Richard Walsh

=== Vacancies ===
- Sir John Esmonde (resigned)
- Joseph Mongan (deceased)

== Seanad election ==
The Dáil election was followed by an election to the 7th Seanad.
