= Joseph Owens (politician) =

Irish politician (1912–1994)

Joseph Owens (4 February 1912 – 1 January 1994) was Mayor of Galway from 1953 to 1954.

Owens was elected Mayor on 25 June 1953, being proposed by the outgoing Mayor. He had been born at the family home in Glenamaddy, his parents being Joseph Owens Sr. and Annie M. Twohy, later Mrs. Dorley. He had a twin sister and a brother, Dick. Upon his father's death, the family moved to Galway in 1922, where his mother ran a drapery store. He and his wife, Nellie English of Cahir, County Tipperary, had two girls and a boy, and were responsible for turning his mother's shop into the successful Atlanta Hotel.

Owens was a versatile sportsman, competing at the top levels in rugby, soccer, tennis, swimming, water polo and rowing (sport). He represented Ireland internationally in rugby and soccer, a rare distinction. He also played Cricket and billiards.

He contested as an independent candidate aged 19, but was not elected till the following year. At the time he was distinguished by being the country's youngest ever Mayor. During his term he welcomed Queen Salote of Tonga to the city, and bestowed the Freedom of the City upon Apostolic Nuncio, Dr. Gerard P. O'Hara.

Joseph Owens died on 1 January 1994 following a short illness.

Civic offices
| Preceded by Michael Lydon | Mayor of Galway; 1953–1954 | Succeeded by Peter Greene |
