= John Mannion Snr =

Irish politician (1907–1978)

Senator
- In office 14 December 1961 – 5 November 1969
- In office 22 July 1954 – 22 May 1957
- Constituency: Agricultural Panel

Teachta Dála
- In office May 1951 – May 1954
- Constituency: Galway West

Personal details
- Born: 4 June 1907 Clifden, County Galway, Ireland
- Died: 10 September 1978 (aged 71) County Galway, Ireland
- Party: Fine Gael
- Children: John Mannion Jnr

John Mannion (4 June 1907 – 10 September 1978) was an Irish Fine Gael politician from Clifden, County Galway. He was a Teachta Dála (TD) for three years and a senator for 11 years.

A farmer before entering politics, Mannion was elected to Dáil Éireann for the Galway West constituency on his first attempt, at the 1951 general election. He lost the seat at the 1954 general election, and although he stood again at the 1957, 1965 and 1969 general elections, he never returned to the Dáil. After his 1954 defeat, he was elected to the 8th Seanad by the Agricultural Panel. He was defeated at the 1957 Seanad election, but regained his seat at the 1961 election and held it until he retired at the 1969 Seanad election.

His son, John Mannion Jnr, succeeded him in the Seanad, and also served one term as a TD.

== See also ==
- Families in the Oireachtas

Dáil	Election	Deputy (Party)	Deputy (Party)	Deputy (Party)	Deputy (Party)	Deputy (Party)
9th	1937	Gerald Bartley (FF)	Joseph Mongan (FG)	Seán Tubridy (FF)	3 seats 1937–1977	
10th	1938	Gerald Bartley (FF)	Joseph Mongan (FG)	Seán Tubridy (FF)	3 seats 1937–1977	
10th	1940 by-election	Gerald Bartley (FF)	Joseph Mongan (FG)	John J. Keane (FF)	3 seats 1937–1977	
11th	1943	Gerald Bartley (FF)	Joseph Mongan (FG)	Eamon Corbett (FF)	3 seats 1937–1977	
12th	1944	Gerald Bartley (FF)	Joseph Mongan (FG)	Michael Lydon (FF)	3 seats 1937–1977	
13th	1948	Gerald Bartley (FF)	Joseph Mongan (FG)	Michael Lydon (FF)	3 seats 1937–1977	
14th	1951	Gerald Bartley (FF)	John Mannion Snr (FG)	Peadar Duignan (FF)	3 seats 1937–1977	
15th	1954	Gerald Bartley (FF)	Fintan Coogan Snr (FG)	Johnny Geoghegan (FF)	3 seats 1937–1977	
16th	1957	Gerald Bartley (FF)	Fintan Coogan Snr (FG)	Johnny Geoghegan (FF)	3 seats 1937–1977	
17th	1961	Gerald Bartley (FF)	Fintan Coogan Snr (FG)	Johnny Geoghegan (FF)	3 seats 1937–1977	
18th	1965	Bobby Molloy (FF)	Fintan Coogan Snr (FG)	Johnny Geoghegan (FF)	3 seats 1937–1977	
19th	1969	Bobby Molloy (FF)	Fintan Coogan Snr (FG)	Johnny Geoghegan (FF)	3 seats 1937–1977	
20th	1973	Bobby Molloy (FF)	Fintan Coogan Snr (FG)	Johnny Geoghegan (FF)	3 seats 1937–1977	
20th	1975 by-election	Bobby Molloy (FF)	Fintan Coogan Snr (FG)	Máire Geoghegan-Quinn (FF)	3 seats 1937–1977	
21st	1977	Bobby Molloy (FF)	John Mannion Jnr (FG)	Máire Geoghegan-Quinn (FF)	Bill Loughnane (FF)	4 seats 1977–1981
22nd	1981	Bobby Molloy (FF)	John Donnellan (FG)	Máire Geoghegan-Quinn (FF)	Mark Killilea Jnr (FF)	Michael D. Higgins (Lab)
23rd	1982 (Feb)	Bobby Molloy (FF)	John Donnellan (FG)	Máire Geoghegan-Quinn (FF)	Frank Fahey (FF)	Michael D. Higgins (Lab)
24th	1982 (Nov)	Bobby Molloy (FF)	John Donnellan (FG)	Máire Geoghegan-Quinn (FF)	Frank Fahey (FF)	Fintan Coogan Jnr (FG)
25th	1987	Bobby Molloy (PDs)	John Donnellan (FG)	Máire Geoghegan-Quinn (FF)	Frank Fahey (FF)	Michael D. Higgins (Lab)
26th	1989	Bobby Molloy (PDs)	Pádraic McCormack (FG)	Máire Geoghegan-Quinn (FF)	Frank Fahey (FF)	Michael D. Higgins (Lab)
27th	1992	Bobby Molloy (PDs)	Pádraic McCormack (FG)	Máire Geoghegan-Quinn (FF)	Éamon Ó Cuív (FF)	Michael D. Higgins (Lab)
28th	1997	Bobby Molloy (PDs)	Pádraic McCormack (FG)	Frank Fahey (FF)	Éamon Ó Cuív (FF)	Michael D. Higgins (Lab)
29th	2002	Noel Grealish (PDs)	Pádraic McCormack (FG)	Frank Fahey (FF)	Éamon Ó Cuív (FF)	Michael D. Higgins (Lab)
30th	2007	Noel Grealish (PDs)	Pádraic McCormack (FG)	Frank Fahey (FF)	Éamon Ó Cuív (FF)	Michael D. Higgins (Lab)
31st	2011	Noel Grealish (Ind)	Brian Walsh (FG)	Seán Kyne (FG)	Éamon Ó Cuív (FF)	Derek Nolan (Lab)
32nd	2016	Noel Grealish (Ind)	Hildegarde Naughton (FG)	Seán Kyne (FG)	Éamon Ó Cuív (FF)	Catherine Connolly (Ind)
33rd	2020	Noel Grealish (Ind)	Hildegarde Naughton (FG)	Mairéad Farrell (SF)	Éamon Ó Cuív (FF)	Catherine Connolly (Ind)
34th	2024	Noel Grealish (Ind)	Hildegarde Naughton (FG)	Mairéad Farrell (SF)	John Connolly (FF)	Catherine Connolly (Ind)
34th	2026 by-election	Noel Grealish (Ind)	Hildegarde Naughton (FG)	Mairéad Farrell (SF)	John Connolly (FF)	
