= List of MPs elected in the 1847 United Kingdom general election =

1847–1852 Parliament of the United Kingdom
←	1841–1847 Parliament	1852–1857 Parliament	→
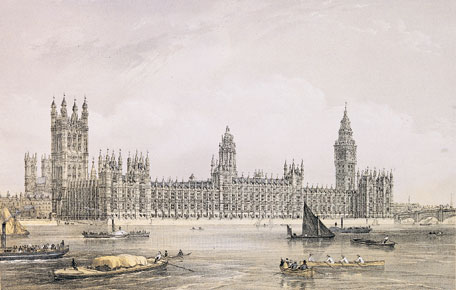
- The Palace of Westminster in 1852

Overview
- Legislative body: Parliament of the United Kingdom
- Jurisdiction: United Kingdom
- Meeting place: Palace of Westminster
- Term: 18 November 1847 – 1 July 1852
- Election: 1847 United Kingdom general election

Crown-in-Parliament Victoria

Sessions
- 1st: 18 November 1847 – 5 September 1848
- 2nd: 1 February 1849 – 1 August 1849
- 3rd: 31 January 1850 – 15 August 1850
- 4th: 4 February 1851 – 8 August 1851
- 5th: 3 February 1852 – 1 July 1852

This is a list of members of Parliament (MPs) elected in the 1847 general election.

Table of contents:

A B C D E F G H I K L M N O P Q R S T W Y Changes

== A ==
Constituency	MP	Party
Aberdeen	Alexander Fordyce	Whig
Aberdeenshire	William Gordon	Conservative
Abingdon	Frederic Thesiger	Conservative
Andover (two members)	Henry Beaumont Coles	Conservative
Andover (two members)	William Cubitt	Conservative
Anglesey	Richard Williams-Bulkeley,	Whig
Antrim (two members)	Nathaniel Alexander	Conservative
Antrim (two members)	Edward Macnaghten	Conservative
Argyllshire	Duncan McNeill	Conservative
Armagh	John Dawson Rawdon	Whig
County Armagh (two members)	William Verner	Conservative
County Armagh (two members)	James Caulfeild	Whig
Arundel	Henry Fitzalan-Howard	Whig
Ashburton	Thomas Matheson	Whig
Ashton-under-Lyne	Charles Hindley	Radical
Athlone	William Keogh	Peelite
Aylesbury (two members)	John Peter Deering	Conservative
Aylesbury (two members)	George Nugent-Grenville	Whig
Ayr	Patrick Crichton-Stuart	Whig
Ayrshire	Alexander Haldane Oswald	Conservative
== B ==
Constituency	MP	Party
Banbury	Henry William Tancred	Whig
Bandon	Francis Bernard	Conservative
Banffshire	James Duff	Whig
Barnstaple (two members)	Richard Bremridge	Conservative
Barnstaple (two members)	John Fortescue	Whig
Bath (two members)	Adam Haldane-Duncan	Whig
Bath (two members)	Anthony Ashley-Cooper	Conservative
Beaumaris	Lord George Paget	Whig
Bedford (two members)	Henry Stuart	Conservative
Bedford (two members)	Harry Verney	Whig
Bedfordshire (two members)	Francis Russell	Whig
Bedfordshire (two members)	John Egerton	Conservative
Belfast (two members)	Robert James Tennent	Whig
Belfast (two members)	John Chichester	Peelite
Berkshire (Three members)	Robert Palmer	Conservative
Berkshire (Three members)	William Barrington	Conservative
Berkshire (Three members)	Philip Pusey	Peelite
Berwickshire	Francis Scott	Conservative
Berwick-upon-Tweed (two members)	Matthew Forster	Whig
Berwick-upon-Tweed (two members)	John Campbell Renton	Conservative
Beverley (two members)	Sackville Lane-Fox	Conservative
Beverley (two members)	John Towneley	Whig
Bewdley	Thomas James Ireland	Conservative
Birmingham (two members)	George Muntz	Radical
Birmingham (two members)	William Scholefield	Radical
Blackburn (two members)	James Pilkington	Whig
Blackburn (two members)	John Hornby	Conservative
Bodmin (two members)	Henry Lacy	Whig
Bodmin (two members)	James Wyld	Radical
Bolton (two members)	William Bolling	Conservative
Bolton (two members)	John Bowring	Radical
Boston (two members)	Benjamin Bond Cabbell	Conservative
Boston (two members)	James Duke	Whig
Bradford (two members)	William Busfield	Whig
Bradford (two members)	Thomas Perronet Thompson	Radical
Brecon	John Lloyd Vaughan Watkins	Whig
Breconshire	Joseph Bailey	Conservative
Bridgnorth (two members)	Robert Pigot	Conservative
Bridgnorth (two members)	Thomas Charlton Whitmore	Conservative
Bridgwater (two members)	Charles Kemeys-Tynte	Whig
Bridgwater (two members)	Henry Broadwood	Conservative
Bridport (two members)	Thomas Alexander Mitchell	Radical
Bridport (two members)	Alexander Baillie-Cochrane	Conservative
Brighton (two members)	George Brooke-Pechell	Whig
Brighton (two members)	Alfred Hervey	Conservative
Bristol (two members)	Henry FitzHardinge Berkeley	Radical
Bristol (two members)	Philip William Skinner Miles	Conservative
Buckingham (two members)	John Hall	Conservative
Buckingham (two members)	Richard Temple-Grenville	Conservative
Buckinghamshire (Three members)	Caledon Du Pré	Conservative
Buckinghamshire (Three members)	Charles Cavendish	Whig
Buckinghamshire (Three members)	Benjamin Disraeli	Conservative
Bury	Richard Walker	Whig
Bury St Edmunds (two members)	Frederick Hervey	Conservative
Bury St Edmunds (two members)	Edward Bunbury	Whig
Buteshire	James Stuart-Wortley	Conservative
== C ==
Constituency	MP	Party
Caernarvon	William Bulkeley Hughes	Peelite
Caernarvonshire	Edward Douglas-Pennant	Conservative
Caithness	George Traill	Whig
Calne	Henry Petty-FitzMaurice	Whig
Cambridge (two members)	Robert Adair	Whig
Cambridge (two members)	William Campbell	Whig
Cambridge University (two members)	Henry Goulburn	Conservative
Cambridge University (two members)	Charles Law	Conservative
Cambridgeshire (Three members)	Eliot Yorke	Conservative
Cambridgeshire (Three members)	Lord George Manners	Conservative
Cambridgeshire (Three members)	Richard Greaves Townley	Whig
Canterbury (two members)	Albert Denison	Whig
Canterbury (two members)	George Smythe	Conservative
Cardiff	John Iltyd Nicholl	Conservative
Cardigan	Pryse Pryse	Whig
Cardiganshire	William Edward Powell	Conservative
Carlisle (two members)	John Dixon	Whig
Carlisle (two members)	William Nicholson Hodgson	Conservative
Carlow	John Sadleir	Whig
County Carlow (two members)	Henry Bruen	Conservative
County Carlow (two members)	William McClintock-Bunbury	Conservative
Carmarthen	David Morris	Whig
Carmarthenshire (two members)	David Davies	Conservative
Carmarthenshire (two members)	George Rice-Trevor	Conservative
Carrickfergus	Wellington Stapleton-Cotton	Conservative
Cashel	Timothy O'Brien	Irish Repeal
Cavan (two members)	John Young	Peelite
Cavan (two members)	James Pierce Maxwell	Conservative
Chatham	George Byng	Whig
Cheltenham	Willoughby Jones	Conservative
Cheshire North (two members)	William Egerton	Conservative
Cheshire North (two members)	Edward Stanley	Whig
Cheshire South (two members)	Philip Grey Egerton	Conservative
Cheshire South (two members)	John Tollemache	Conservative
Chester (two members)	Hugh Grosvenor	Whig
Chester (two members)	John Jervis	Radical
Chichester (two members)	John Abel Smith	Whig
Chichester (two members)	Henry Lennox	Conservative
Chippenham (two members)	Joseph Neeld	Conservative
Chippenham (two members)	Henry George Boldero	Conservative
Christchurch	Edward Harris	Conservative
Cirencester (two members)	William Cripps	Conservative
Cirencester (two members)	George Child Villiers	Conservative
Clackmannanshire and Kinross-shire	William Morison	Whig
Clare (two members)	William Nugent Macnamara	Irish Repeal
Clare (two members)	Lucius O'Brien	Conservative
Clitheroe	Mathew Wilson	Whig
Clonmel	Cecil Lawless	Irish Repeal
Cockermouth (two members)	Edward Horsman	Whig
Cockermouth (two members)	Henry Aglionby Aglionby	Radical
Colchester (two members)	Joseph Hardcastle	Whig
Colchester (two members)	George Smyth	Conservative
Coleraine	John Boyd	Peelite
Cork City (two members)	Daniel Callaghan	Irish Repeal
Cork City (two members)	William Trant Fagan	Irish Repeal
County Cork (two members)	Edmond Roche	Irish Repeal
County Cork (two members)	Maurice Power	Irish Repeal
East Cornwall (two members)	Thomas Agar-Robartes	Whig
East Cornwall (two members)	William Pole-Carew	Conservative
West Cornwall (two members)	Edward Wynne-Pendarves	Whig
West Cornwall (two members)	Charles Lemon	Whig
Coventry (two members)	Edward Ellice	Whig
Coventry (two members)	George James Turner	Conservative
Cricklade (two members)	John Neeld	Conservative
Cricklade (two members)	Ambrose Goddard	Conservative
East Cumberland (two members)	Charles Howard	Whig
East Cumberland (two members)	William Marshall	Whig
West Cumberland (two members)	Henry Lowther	Conservative
West Cumberland (two members)	Edward Stanley	Conservative
== D ==
Constituency	MP	Party
Dartmouth	George Moffatt	Radical
Denbigh Boroughs	Frederick Richard West	Conservative
Denbighshire (two members)	Watkin Williams-Wynn	Conservative
Denbighshire (two members)	William Bagot	Conservative
Derby (two members)	Frederick Leveson-Gower	Whig
Derby (two members)	Edward Strutt	Whig
Derbyshire North (two members)	George Cavendish	Whig
Derbyshire North (two members)	William Evans	Whig
Derbyshire South (two members)	Charles Robert Colvile	Peelite
Derbyshire South (two members)	Edward Miller Mundy	Conservative
Devizes (two members)	George Heneage	Conservative
Devizes (two members)	William Heald Ludlow Bruges	Conservative
Devonport (two members)	Henry Tufnell	Whig
Devonport (two members)	John Romilly	Whig
North Devon (two members)	Thomas Dyke Acland	Conservative
North Devon (two members)	Lewis William Buck	Conservative
South Devon (two members)	John Yarde-Buller	Conservative
South Devon (two members)	William Courtenay	Conservative
Donegal (two members)	Edmund Hayes	Conservative
Donegal (two members)	Edward Michael Conolly	Conservative
Dorchester (two members)	Henry Sturt	Conservative
Dorchester (two members)	George Dawson-Damer	Conservative
Dorset (Three members)	George Bankes	Conservative
Dorset (Three members)	Henry Seymer	Conservative
Dorset (Three members)	John Floyer	Conservative
Dover (two members)	Edward Royd Rice	Whig
Dover (two members)	George Clerk	Conservative
Down (two members)	Edwin Hill	Conservative
Down (two members)	Frederick Stewart	Conservative
Downpatrick	Richard Ker	Peelite
Drogheda	William Somerville	Whig
Droitwich	John Pakington	Conservative
Dublin (two members)	Edward Grogan	Conservative
Dublin (two members)	John Reynolds	Irish Repeal
County Dublin (two members)	James Hans Hamilton	Conservative
County Dublin (two members)	Thomas Edward Taylor	Conservative
Dublin University (two members)	George Alexander Hamilton	Conservative
Dublin University (two members)	Frederick Shaw	Conservative
Dudley	John Benbow	Conservative
Dumfries	William Ewart	Whig
Dumfriesshire	Archibald Douglas	Conservative
Dunbartonshire	Alexander Smollett	Conservative
Dundalk	Charles MacTavish	Irish Repeal
Dundee	George Duncan	Whig
Dungannon	Thomas Knox	Peelite
Dungarvan	Richard Lalor Sheil	Radical
Durham City (two members)	Thomas Granger	Radical
Durham City (two members)	Henry John Spearman	Whig
North Durham (two members)	Robert Duncombe Shafto	Whig
North Durham (two members)	George Vane-Tempest	Conservative
South Durham (two members)	Harry Vane	Whig
South Durham (two members)	James Farrer	Conservative
== E ==
Constituency	MP	Party
East Retford (two members)	George Monckton-Arundell	Conservative
East Retford (two members)	Arthur Duncombe	Conservative
Edinburgh (two members)	Charles Cowan	Radical
Edinburgh (two members)	William Gibson-Craig	Whig
Elgin	George Skene Duff	Whig
Elginshire and Nairnshire	Charles Cumming-Bruce	Conservative
Ennis	James Patrick Mahon	Irish Repeal
Enniskillen	Henry Cole	Conservative
Essex North (two members)	John Tyrell	Conservative
Essex North (two members)	William Beresford	Conservative
Essex South (two members)	Thomas William Bramston	Conservative
Essex South (two members)	Edward Buxton	Whig
Evesham (two members)	Henry Willoughby	Conservative
Evesham (two members)	Marcus Hill	Whig
Exeter (two members)	Edward Divett	Radical
Exeter (two members)	John Duckworth	Conservative
Eye	Edward Kerrison	Conservative
== F ==
Constituency	MP	Party
Falkirk Burghs	Henry Pelham-Clinton	Conservative
Fermanagh (two members)	Mervyn Edward Archdale	Conservative
Fermanagh (two members)	Arthur Brooke	Conservative
Fife	John Fergus	Whig
Finsbury (two members)	Thomas Slingsby Duncombe	Radical
Finsbury (two members)	Thomas Wakley	Radical
Flint	John Hanmer	Peelite
Flintshire	Edward Lloyd-Mostyn	Whig
Forfarshire	Frederick Gordon-Hallyburton	Whig
Frome	Robert Edward Boyle	Whig
== G ==
Constituency	MP	Party
Galway Borough (two members)	Martin Blake	Irish Repeal
Galway Borough (two members)	Anthony O'Flaherty	Irish Repeal
County Galway (two members)	Thomas Burke	Irish Repeal
County Galway (two members)	Christopher St George	Conservative
Gateshead	William Hutt	Radical
Glamorganshire (two members)	Christopher Rice Mansel Talbot	Whig
Glamorganshire (two members)	Edwin Wyndham-Quin	Conservative
Glasgow (two members)	John McGregor	Whig
Glasgow (two members)	Alexander Hastie	Whig
Gloucester (two members)	Maurice Berkeley	Whig
Gloucester (two members)	Henry Thomas Hope	Conservative
Gloucestershire East (two members)	Christopher William Codrington	Conservative
Gloucestershire East (two members)	Henry Somerset	Conservative
Gloucestershire West (two members)	Robert Hale	Conservative
Gloucestershire West (two members)	Grantley Berkeley	Whig
Grantham (two members)	Glynne Earle-Welby	Conservative
Grantham (two members)	Frederick Tollemache	Conservative
Great Grimsby	Edward Heneage	Whig
Great Marlow (two members)	Thomas Peers Williams	Conservative
Great Marlow (two members)	Brownlow William Knox	Conservative
Great Yarmouth (two members)	Arthur Lennox	Conservative
Great Yarmouth (two members)	Octavius Coope	Conservative
Greenock	William Elliot-Murray-Kynynmound	Whig
Greenwich (two members)	James Whitley Deans Dundas	Whig
Greenwich (two members)	Edward George Barnard	Radical
Guildford (two members)	Ross Donnelly Mangles	Whig
Guildford (two members)	Henry Currie	Conservative
== H ==
Constituency	MP	Party
Haddington	Henry Ferguson-Davie	Whig
Haddingtonshire	Francis Charteris	Conservative
Halifax (two members)	Charles Wood	Whig
Halifax (two members)	Henry Edwards	Conservative
Hampshire North (two members)	Charles Shaw-Lefevre	Speaker (Whig)
Hampshire North (two members)	William Heathcote	Conservative
Hampshire South (two members)	Henry Combe Compton	Conservative
Hampshire South (two members)	Charles Wellesley	Conservative
Harwich (two members)	John Attwood	Peelite
Harwich (two members)	John Bagshaw	Whig
Hastings (two members)	Musgrave Brisco	Conservative
Hastings (two members)	Robert Hollond	Radical
Haverfordwest	John Evans	Whig
Helston	Richard Vyvyan	Conservative
Hereford (two members)	Robert Price	Whig
Hereford (two members)	Henry Morgan-Clifford	Whig
Herefordshire (Three members)	Francis Haggitt	Conservative
Herefordshire (Three members)	Joseph Bailey	Conservative
Herefordshire (Three members)	George Cornewall Lewis	Whig
Hertford (two members)	William Cowper-Temple	Whig
Hertford (two members)	Philip Stanhope	Conservative
Hertfordshire (Three members)	Thomas Plumer Halsey	Conservative
Hertfordshire (Three members)	Henry Meux	Conservative
Hertfordshire (Three members)	Thomas Trevor	Whig
Honiton (two members)	Joseph Locke	Whig
Honiton (two members)	James Hogg	Conservative
Horsham	John Jervis	Radical
Huddersfield	William Crompton-Stansfield	Whig
Huntingdon (two members)	Jonathan Peel	Conservative
Huntingdon (two members)	Thomas Baring	Conservative
Huntingdonshire (two members)	Edward Fellowes	Conservative
Huntingdonshire (two members)	George Thornhill	Conservative
Hythe	Edward Brockman	Whig
== I ==
Constituency	MP	Party
Inverness Burghs	Alexander Matheson	Whig
Inverness-shire	Henry Baillie	Conservative
Ipswich (two members)	John Cobbold	Conservative
Ipswich (two members)	Hugh Adair	Whig
Isle of Wight	John Simeon	Whig
== K ==
Constituency	MP	Party
Kendal	George Glyn	Whig
Kent East (two members)	William Deedes	Conservative
Kent East (two members)	John Pemberton Plumptre	Conservative
Kent West (two members)	Edmund Filmer	Conservative
Kent West (two members)	Thomas Law Hodges	Whig
Kerry (two members)	Henry Arthur Herbert	Peelite
Kerry (two members)	Morgan John O'Connell	Irish Repeal
Kidderminster	Richard Godson	Peelite
Kildare (two members)	Richard Bourke	Conservative
Kildare (two members)	Charles FitzGerald	Whig
Kilkenny City	Michael Sullivan	Irish Repeal
County Kilkenny (two members)	John Greene	Irish Repeal
County Kilkenny (two members)	Pierce Somerset Butler	Irish Repeal
Kilmarnock Burghs	Edward Pleydell-Bouverie	Whig
Kincardineshire	Hugh Arbuthnott	Conservative
King's County (two members)	Andrew Armstrong	Whig
King's County (two members)	John Westenra	Whig
King's Lynn (two members)	Viscount Jocelyn	Peelite
King's Lynn (two members)	George Bentinck	Conservative
Kingston upon Hull (two members)	James Clay	Radical
Kingston upon Hull (two members)	Matthew Talbot Baines	Whig
Kinsale	Richard Samuel Guinness	Conservative
Kirkcaldy Burghs	Robert Munro-Ferguson	Whig
Kirkcudbright	Thomas Maitland	Whig
Knaresborough (two members)	Joshua Westhead	Whig
Knaresborough (two members)	William Lascelles	Peelite
== L ==
Constituency	MP	Party
Lambeth (two members)	Charles Tennyson-d'Eyncourt	Whig
Lambeth (two members)	Charles Pearson	Whig
Lanarkshire	William Lockhart	Conservative
Lancashire North (two members)	John Wilson-Patten	Peelite
Lancashire North (two members)	James Heywood	Whig
Lancashire South (two members)	William Brown	Radical
Lancashire South (two members)	Charles Pelham Villiers	Radical
Lancaster (two members)	Samuel Gregson	Whig
Lancaster (two members)	Thomas Greene	Peelite
Launceston	William Bowles	Conservative
Leeds (two members)	William Beckett	Conservative
Leeds (two members)	James Garth Marshall	Whig
Leicester (two members)	Joshua Walmsley	Radical
Leicester (two members)	Richard Gardner	Radical
Leicestershire North (two members)	Edward Farnham	Conservative
Leicestershire North (two members)	Charles Manners	Conservative
Leicestershire South (two members)	Henry Halford	Conservative
Leicestershire South (two members)	Charles Packe	Conservative
Leith Burghs	Andrew Rutherfurd	Whig
Leitrim (two members)	Edward King-Tenison	Whig
Leitrim (two members)	Charles Skeffington Clements	Whig
Leominster (two members)	George Arkwright	Conservative
Leominster (two members)	Henry Barkly	Conservative
Lewes (two members)	Henry FitzRoy	Peelite
Lewes (two members)	Robert Perfect	Whig
Lichfield (two members)	Alfred Paget	Whig
Lichfield (two members)	Thomas Anson	Whig
Limerick City (two members)	John O'Brien	Irish Repeal
Limerick City (two members)	John O'Connell	Irish Repeal
County Limerick (two members)	William Smith O'Brien	Irish Confederation
County Limerick (two members)	William Monsell	Whig
Lincoln (two members)	Colonel Sibthorp	Conservative
Lincoln (two members)	Charles Seely	Radical
Lincolnshire North (two members)	Robert Christopher	Conservative
Lincolnshire North (two members)	Montague Cholmeley	Whig
Lincolnshire South (two members)	John Trollope	Conservative
Lincolnshire South (two members)	William Cecil	Conservative
Linlithgowshire	George Dundas	Conservative
Lisburn	Horace Seymour	Peelite
Liskeard	Charles Buller	Radical
Liverpool (two members)	Edward Cardwell	Peelite
Liverpool (two members)	Thomas Birch	Whig
The City of London (Four members)	John Masterman	Conservative
The City of London (Four members)	John Russell	Whig
The City of London (Four members)	Lionel de Rothschild	Whig
The City of London (Four members)	James Pattison	Whig
Londonderry City	Robert Ferguson	Whig
County Londonderry (two members)	Theobald Jones	Conservative
County Londonderry (two members)	Thomas Bateson	Conservative
County Longford (two members)	Richard Fox	Irish Repeal
County Longford (two members)	Samuel Blackall	Irish Repeal
County Louth (two members)	Chichester Fortescue	Whig
County Louth (two members)	Richard Bellew	Whig
Ludlow (two members)	Henry Bayley Clive	Conservative
Ludlow (two members)	Henry Salwey	Whig
Lyme Regis	Thomas Abdy	Whig
Lymington (two members)	George Keppel	Whig
Lymington (two members)	William Alexander Mackinnon	Peelite
== M ==
Constituency	MP	Party
Macclesfield (two members)	John Brocklehurst	Whig
Macclesfield (two members)	John Williams	Radical
Maidstone (two members)	George Dodd	Conservative
Maidstone (two members)	Alexander Beresford Hope	Conservative
Maldon (two members)	Thomas Barrett-Lennard	Whig
Maldon (two members)	David Waddington	Conservative
Mallow	Denham Jephson-Norreys	Whig
Malmesbury	James Howard	Whig
Malton (two members)	Evelyn Denison	Whig
Malton (two members)	John Walbanke-Childers	Whig
Manchester (two members)	Thomas Milner Gibson	Radical
Manchester (two members)	John Bright	Radical
Marlborough (two members)	Ernest Brudenell-Bruce	Peelite
Marlborough (two members)	Henry Bingham Baring	Peelite
Marylebone (two members)	Benjamin Hall	Whig
Marylebone (two members)	Dudley Stuart	Whig
Mayo (two members)	George Henry Moore	Whig
Mayo (two members)	Robert Dillon Browne	Irish Repeal
Meath (two members)	Matthew Corbally	Whig
Meath (two members)	Henry Grattan	Irish Repeal
Merioneth	Richard Richards	Conservative
Merthyr Tydvil	John Josiah Guest	Whig
Middlesex (two members)	Robert Grosvenor	Whig
Middlesex (two members)	Ralph Bernal Osborne	Radical
Midhurst	Spencer Horatio Walpole	Conservative
Midlothian	Sir John Hope	Conservative
Monaghan (two members)	Charles Powell Leslie	Conservative
Monaghan (two members)	Thomas Vesey Dawson	Whig
Monmouth Boroughs	Reginald Blewitt	Whig
Monmouthshire (two members)	Octavius Morgan	Conservative
Monmouthshire (two members)	Granville Somerset	Conservative
Montgomery	David Pugh	Conservative
Montgomeryshire	Charles Williams-Wynn	Conservative
Montrose	Joseph Hume	Radical
Morpeth	Edward Howard	Whig
== N ==
Constituency	MP	Party
Newark (two members)	John Manners-Sutton	Conservative
Newark (two members)	John Stuart	Conservative
Newcastle-under-Lyme (two members)	Samuel Christy	Peelite
Newcastle-under-Lyme (two members)	William Jackson	Whig
Newcastle-upon-Tyne (two members)	Thomas Emerson Headlam	Whig
Newcastle-upon-Tyne (two members)	William Ord	Whig
Newport (two members)	Charles Wykeham Martin	Peelite
Newport (two members)	William Plowden	Peelite
New Ross	John Hyacinth Talbot	Irish Repeal
Newry	Francis Needham	Peelite
New Shoreham (two members)	Charles Burrell	Conservative
New Shoreham (two members)	Charles Goring	Conservative
Norfolk East (two members)	Edmond Wodehouse	Conservative
Norfolk East (two members)	Henry Negus Burroughes	Conservative
Norfolk West (two members)	William Bagge	Conservative
Norfolk West (two members)	Edward Coke	Whig
Northallerton	William Battie-Wrightson	Whig
Northampton (two members)	Robert Vernon	Whig
Northampton (two members)	Raikes Currie	Radical
Northamptonshire North (two members)	Thomas Maunsell	Conservative
Northamptonshire North (two members)	Augustus Stafford	Conservative
Northamptonshire South (two members)	Richard Vyse	Conservative
Northamptonshire South (two members)	Rainald Knightley	Conservative
Northumberland North (two members)	Charles Bennet	Conservative
Northumberland North (two members)	George Grey	Whig
Northumberland South (two members)	Matthew Bell	Conservative
Northumberland South (two members)	Saville Ogle	Whig
Norwich (two members)	Morton Peto	Whig
Norwich (two members)	Arthur Wellesley	Conservative
Nottingham (two members)	John Walter	Conservative
Nottingham (two members)	Feargus O'Connor	Chartist
Nottinghamshire North (two members)	Henry Scott-Bentinck	Conservative
Nottinghamshire North (two members)	Thomas Houldsworth	Conservative
Nottinghamshire South (two members)	Thomas Thoroton-Hildyard	Conservative
Nottinghamshire South (two members)	Lancelot Rolleston	Conservative
== O ==
Constituency	MP	Party
Oldham (two members)	John Duncuft	Peelite
Oldham (two members)	William Johnson Fox	Radical
Orkney and Shetland	Arthur Anderson	Whig
Oxford (two members)	James Haughton Langston	Whig
Oxford (two members)	William Wood	Radical
Oxfordshire (Three members)	George Harcourt	Conservative
Oxfordshire (Three members)	J. W. Henley	Conservative
Oxfordshire (Three members)	Montagu Bertie	Conservative
Oxford University (two members)	Robert Inglis	Conservative
Oxford University (two members)	William Ewart Gladstone	Peelite
== P ==
Constituency	MP	Party
Paisley	Archibald Hastie	Radical
Peeblesshire	William Forbes Mackenzie	Conservative
Pembroke	John Owen	Peelite
Pembrokeshire	John Campbell	Conservative
Penryn and Falmouth (two members)	Howel Gwyn	Conservative
Penryn and Falmouth (two members)	Francis Mowatt	Radical
Perth	Fox Maule	Whig
Perthshire	Henry Home-Drummond	Peelite
Peterborough (two members)	George Wentworth-FitzWilliam	Whig
Peterborough (two members)	William Cavendish	Whig
Petersfield	William Joliffe	Conservative
Plymouth (two members)	Roundell Palmer	Peelite
Plymouth (two members)	Hugh Fortescue	Whig
Pontefract (two members)	Richard Monckton Milnes	Conservative
Pontefract (two members)	Samuel Martin	Whig
Poole (two members)	George Richard Robinson	Peelite
Poole (two members)	George Philips	Whig
Portarlington	Francis Plunkett Dunne	Whig
Portsmouth (two members)	Francis Baring	Whig
Portsmouth (two members)	George Staunton	Whig
Preston (two members)	George Strickland	Whig
Preston (two members)	Charles Grenfell	Whig
== Q ==
Constituency	MP	Party
Queen's County (two members)	John FitzPatrick	Whig
Queen's County (two members)	Thomas Vesey, 3rd Viscount de Vesci	Conservative
== R ==
Constituency	MP	Party
Radnor	Thomas Frankland Lewis	Whig
Radnorshire	John Walsh	Conservative
Reading (two members)	Francis Piggott	Whig
Reading (two members)	Thomas Talfourd	Radical
Reigate	Thomas Somers-Cocks	Conservative
Renfrewshire	William Mure	Conservative
Richmond (two members)	Henry Rich	Whig
Richmond (two members)	Marmaduke Wyvill	Whig
Ripon (two members)	Edwin Lascelles	Conservative
Ripon (two members)	James Graham	Peelite
Rochdale	William Sharman Crawford	Radical
Rochester (two members)	Ralph Bernal	Whig
Rochester (two members)	Thomas Twisden Hodges	Whig
Roscommon (two members)	Fitzstephen French	Whig
Roscommon (two members)	Oliver Grace	Whig
Ross and Cromarty	James Matheson	Whig
Roxburghshire	John Elliot	Whig
Rutland (two members)	Gilbert Heathcote	Whig
Rutland (two members)	Gerard Noel	Conservative
Rye	Herbert Mascall Curteis	Whig
== S ==
Constituency	MP	Party
St Albans (two members)	Alexander Raphael	Whig
St Albans (two members)	George Repton	Conservative
St Andrews	Edward Ellice	Whig
St Ives	William Powlett	Conservative
Salford	Joseph Brotherton	Radical
Salisbury (two members)	William James Chaplin	Whig
Salisbury (two members)	Charles Baring Wall	Peelite
Sandwich (two members)	Clarence Paget	Whig
Sandwich (two members)	Charles Grenfell	Whig
Scarborough (two members)	John Vanden-Bempde-Johnstone	Peelite
Scarborough (two members)	George Phipps	Whig
Selkirkshire	Allan Eliott-Lockhart	Conservative
Shaftesbury	Richard Brinsley Sheridan	Whig
Sheffield (two members)	John Parker	Whig
Sheffield (two members)	Henry George Ward	Radical
Shrewsbury (two members)	Edward Holmes Baldock	Conservative
Shrewsbury (two members)	Robert Aglionby Slaney	Whig
Shropshire North (two members)	William Ormsby-Gore	Conservative
Shropshire North (two members)	Edward Herbert	Conservative
Shropshire South (two members)	Robert Clive	Conservative
Shropshire South (two members)	Orlando Bridgeman	Conservative
Sligo	John Patrick Somers	Irish Repeal
County Sligo (two members)	John Ffolliott	Conservative
County Sligo (two members)	William Ormsby-Gore	Conservative
Somerset East (two members)	William Miles	Conservative
Somerset East (two members)	William Pinney	Whig
Somerset West (two members)	Charles Moody	Conservative
Somerset West (two members)	Alexander Hood	Conservative
Southampton (two members)	Alexander Cockburn	Whig
Southampton (two members)	Brodie McGhie Willcox	Whig
South Shields	John Wawn	Radical
Southwark (two members)	William Molesworth	Radical
Southwark (two members)	John Humphery	Whig
Stafford (two members)	David Urquhart	Conservative
Stafford (two members)	Thomas Sidney	Conservative
Staffordshire North (two members)	Charles Adderley	Conservative
Staffordshire North (two members)	George Egerton	Conservative
Staffordshire South (two members)	George Anson	Whig
Staffordshire South (two members)	Henry Chetwynd-Talbot	Conservative
Stamford (two members)	John Charles Herries	Conservative
Stamford (two members)	Charles Manners	Conservative
Stirling	John Benjamin Smith	Radical
Stirlingshire	William Forbes	Conservative
Stockport (two members)	Richard Cobden	Radical
Stockport (two members)	James Heald	Conservative
Stoke-upon-Trent (two members)	John Lewis Ricardo	Whig
Stoke-upon-Trent (two members)	William Taylor Copeland	Conservative
Stroud (two members)	William Henry Stanton	Whig
Stroud (two members)	George Julius Poulett Scrope	Whig
Suffolk East (two members)	Edward Gooch	Conservative
Suffolk East (two members)	Frederick Thellusson	Conservative
Suffolk West (two members)	Harry Spencer Waddington	Conservative
Suffolk West (two members)	Philip Bennett	Conservative
Sunderland (two members)	George Hudson	Conservative
Sunderland (two members)	David Barclay	Whig
Surrey East (two members)	Peter King	Whig
Surrey East (two members)	Thomas Alcock	Whig
Surrey West (two members)	Henry Drummond	Conservative
Surrey West (two members)	William Joseph Denison	Whig
Sussex East (two members)	Augustus Fuller	Conservative
Sussex East (two members)	Charles Frewen	Conservative
Sussex West (two members)	Charles Gordon-Lennox	Conservative
Sussex West (two members)	Richard Prime	Conservative
Sutherland	David Dundas	Whig
Swansea District	John Henry Vivian	Whig
== T ==
Constituency	MP	Party
Tamworth (two members)	William Yates Peel	Conservative
Tamworth (two members)	Robert Peel	Peelite
Taunton (two members)	Henry Labouchere	Whig
Taunton (two members)	Sir Edward Colebrooke	Whig
Tavistock (two members)	Edward Russell	Whig
Tavistock (two members)	John Salusbury Trelawny	Radical
Tewkesbury (two members)	John Martin	Whig
Tewkesbury (two members)	Humphrey Brown	Whig
Thetford (two members)	William FitzRoy	Whig
Thetford (two members)	Bingham Baring	Conservative
Thirsk	John Bell	Whig
Tipperary (two members)	Francis Scully	Irish Repeal
Tipperary (two members)	Nicholas Maher	Irish Repeal
Tiverton (two members)	John Heathcoat	Whig
Tiverton (two members)	Henry Temple	Whig
Totnes (two members)	Edward Seymour	Whig
Totnes (two members)	Charles Barry Baldwin	Conservative
Tower Hamlets (two members)	William Clay	Radical
Tower Hamlets (two members)	George Thompson	Radical
Tralee	Maurice O'Connell	Irish Repeal
Truro (two members)	John Vivian	Conservative
Truro (two members)	Edmund Turner	Whig
Tynemouth and North Shields	Ralph Grey	Whig
Tyrone (two members)	Henry Lowry-Corry	Peelite
Tyrone (two members)	Claud Hamilton	Peelite
== W ==
Constituency	MP	Party
Wakefield	George Sandars	Conservative
Wallingford	William Seymour Blackstone	Conservative
Walsall	Edward Littleton	Whig
Wareham	John Erle-Drax	Whig
Warrington	Gilbert Greenall	Conservative
Warwick (two members)	William Collins	Whig
Warwick (two members)	Charles Eurwicke Douglas	Conservative
Warwickshire North (two members)	Charles Newdigate Newdegate	Conservative
Warwickshire North (two members)	Richard Spooner	Conservative
Warwickshire South (two members)	George Greville	Conservative
Warwickshire South (two members)	Evelyn Shirley	Conservative
Waterford City (two members)	Thomas Meager	Irish Repeal
Waterford City (two members)	Daniel O'Connell Jnr	Irish Repeal
County Waterford (two members)	Nicholas Mahon Power	Irish Repeal
County Waterford (two members)	Robert Keating	Irish Repeal
Wells (two members)	William Hayter	Whig
Wells (two members)	Richard Blakemore	Conservative
Wenlock (two members)	George Weld-Forester	Conservative
Wenlock (two members)	James Milnes Gaskell	Conservative
Westbury	James Wilson	Whig
Westmeath (two members)	William Magan	Irish Repeal
Westmeath (two members)	Percy Nugent	Whig
Westminster (two members)	Sir De Lacy Evans	Radical
Westminster (two members)	Charles Lushington	Whig
Westmorland (two members)	Henry Lowther	Conservative
Westmorland (two members)	William Thompson	Conservative
Wexford	John Devereux	Irish Repeal
County Wexford (two members)	James Fagan	Irish Repeal
County Wexford (two members)	Hamilton Knox Grogan Morgan	Irish Repeal
Weymouth and Melcombe Regis (two members)	William Freestun	Whig
Weymouth and Melcombe Regis (two members)	William Dougal Christie	Whig
Whitby	Robert Stephenson	Conservative
Whitehaven	Robert Hildyard	Conservative
Wick District	James Loch	Whig
Wicklow (two members)	William Wentworth-FitzWilliam	Whig
Wicklow (two members)	William Acton	Conservative
Wigan (two members)	James Lindsay	Conservative
Wigan (two members)	Ralph Thicknesse	Whig
Wigtown Burghs	John McTaggart	Whig
Wigtownshire	John Dalrymple	Whig
Wilton	James Agar	Peelite
Wiltshire North (two members)	Walter Long	Conservative
Wiltshire North (two members)	T. H. S. Sotheron-Estcourt	Conservative
Wiltshire South (two members)	Sidney Herbert	Peelite
Wiltshire South (two members)	John Benett	Whig
Winchester (two members)	James Buller East	Conservative
Winchester (two members)	John Bonham-Carter	Whig
Windsor (two members)	Lord John Hay	Whig
Windsor (two members)	George Alexander Reid	Conservative
Wolverhampton (two members)	Charles Pelham Villiers	Radical
Wolverhampton (two members)	Thomas Thornely	Radical
Woodstock	John Spencer-Churchill	Conservative
Worcester (two members)	Osman Ricardo	Whig
Worcester (two members)	Francis Rufford	Conservative
Worcestershire East (two members)	George Rushout	Conservative
Worcestershire East (two members)	John Hodgetts-Foley	Whig
Worcestershire West (two members)	Henry Lygon	Conservative
Worcestershire West (two members)	Frederick Knight	Conservative
Wycombe (two members)	George Dashwood	Whig
Wycombe (two members)	Martin Tucker Smith	Whig
== Y ==
Constituency	MP	Party
York (two members)	John George Smyth	Conservative
York (two members)	Henry Redhead Yorke	Whig
East Riding of Yorkshire (two members)	Beaumont Hotham	Conservative
East Riding of Yorkshire (two members)	Henry Broadley	Conservative
North Riding of Yorkshire (two members)	Edward Cayley	Whig
North Riding of Yorkshire (two members)	Octavius Duncombe	Conservative
West Riding of Yorkshire (two members)	Richard Cobden	Radical
West Riding of Yorkshire (two members)	George Howard	Whig
Youghal	Thomas Chisholm Anstey	Irish Confederate

== See also ==
- List of parliaments of the United Kingdom
