= List of MPs elected in the 1852 United Kingdom general election =

1852–1857 Parliament of the United Kingdom
←	1847–1852 Parliament	1857–1859 Parliament	→
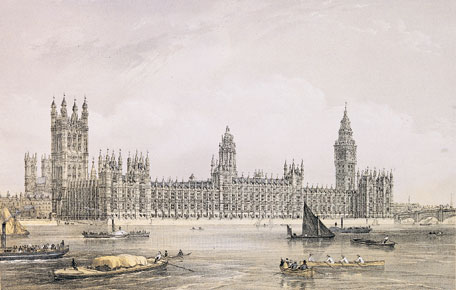
- The Palace of Westminster in 1852

Overview
- Legislative body: Parliament of the United Kingdom
- Jurisdiction: United Kingdom
- Meeting place: Palace of Westminster
- Term: 4 November 1852 – 21 March 1857
- Election: 1852 United Kingdom general election

Crown-in-Parliament Victoria

Sessions
- 1st: 4 November 1852 – 20 August 1853
- 2nd: 31 January 1854 – 12 August 1854
- 3rd: 12 December 1854 – 14 August 1855
- 4th: 31 January 1856 – 29 July 1856
- 5th: 3 February 1857 – 21 March 1857

This is a list of MPs elected to the House of Commons at the 1852 United Kingdom general election, arranged by constituency. New MPs elected since the general election and changes in party allegiance are noted at the bottom of the page.

Table of contents:

A B C D E F G H I K L M N O P Q R S T W Y Changes

== A ==
Constituency	MP	Party
Aberdeen	George Thompson	Liberal
Aberdeenshire	Hon. William Gordon	Conservative
Abingdon	James Caulfeild	Liberal
Andover (two members)	Henry Beaumont Coles	Conservative
Andover (two members)	William Cubitt	Conservative
Anglesey	Sir Richard Williams-Bulkeley, Bt	Liberal
Antrim (two members)	Edward William Pakenham	Conservative
Antrim (two members)	George Macartney	Conservative
Argyllshire	Sir Archibald Campbell, Bt	Conservative
Armagh	Ross Stephenson Moore	Conservative
County Armagh (two members)	Sir William Verner, Bt	Conservative
County Armagh (two members)	James Caulfeild	Liberal
Arundel	Edward Fitzalan-Howard	Liberal
Ashburton	George Moffatt	Liberal
Ashton-under-Lyne	Charles Hindley	Liberal
Athlone	William Keogh	Irish
Aylesbury (two members)	Sir Richard Bethell	Liberal
Aylesbury (two members)	Austen Henry Layard	Liberal
Ayr	Edward Craufurd	Liberal
Ayrshire	James Hunter Blair	Conservative
== B ==
Constituency	MP	Party
Banbury	Henry William Tancred	Liberal
Bandon	Francis Bernard	Conservative
Banffshire	James Duff	Liberal
Barnstaple (two members)	Richard Bremridge	Conservative
Barnstaple (two members)	Sir William Fraser, Bt	Conservative
Bath (two members)	George Treweeke Scobell	Liberal
Bath (two members)	Thomas Phinn	Liberal
Beaumaris	Lord George Paget	Liberal
Bedford (two members)	Henry Stuart	Conservative
Bedford (two members)	Samuel Whitbread	Liberal
Bedfordshire (two members)	Francis Russell	Liberal
Bedfordshire (two members)	Richard Gilpin	Conservative
Belfast (two members)	Richard Davison	Conservative
Belfast (two members)	Hugh Cairns	Conservative
Berkshire (Three members)	Robert Palmer	Conservative
Berkshire (Three members)	William Barrington	Conservative
Berkshire (Three members)	George Henry Vansittart	Conservative
Berwickshire	Hon. Francis Scott	Conservative
Berwick-upon-Tweed (two members)	Matthew Forster	Liberal
Berwick-upon-Tweed (two members)	John Stapleton	Liberal
Beverley (two members)	Hon. Francis Charles Lawley	Liberal
Beverley (two members)	William Wells	Liberal
Bewdley	Sir Thomas Winnington, Bt	Whig
Birmingham (two members)	George Muntz	Liberal
Birmingham (two members)	William Scholefield	Liberal
Blackburn (two members)	James Pilkington	Liberal
Blackburn (two members)	William Eccles	Liberal
Bodmin (two members)	William Michell	Whig
Bodmin (two members)	Charles Graves-Sawle	Whig
Bolton (two members)	Thomas Barnes	Whig
Bolton (two members)	Joseph Crook	Radical
Boston (two members)	Benjamin Bond Cabbell	Conservative
Boston (two members)	Gilbert Heathcote	Whig
Bradford (two members)	Robert Milligan	Liberal
Bradford (two members)	Henry Wickham Wickham	Peelite
Brecon	Charles Rodney Morgan	Conservative
Breconshire	Sir Joseph Bailey, Bt	Conservative
Bridgnorth (two members)	Sir Robert Pigot, Bt	Conservative
Bridgnorth (two members)	Henry Whitmore	Conservative
Bridgwater (two members)	Charles Kemeys-Tynte	Liberal
Bridgwater (two members)	Brent Spencer Follett	Conservative
Bridport (two members)	Thomas Alexander Mitchell	Liberal
Bridport (two members)	John Patrick Murrough	Whig
Brighton (two members)	Sir George Brooke-Pechell, Bt	Liberal
Brighton (two members)	Lord Alfred Hervey	Conservative
Bristol (two members)	Henry FitzHardinge Berkeley	Liberal
Bristol (two members)	Henry Gore-Langton	Liberal
Buckingham (two members)	John Hall	Conservative
Buckingham (two members)	The Marquess of Chandos	Conservative
Buckinghamshire (Three members)	Caledon Du Pré	Conservative
Buckinghamshire (Three members)	Hon. Charles Cavendish	Whig
Buckinghamshire (Three members)	Benjamin Disraeli	Conservative
Bury	Frederick Peel	Liberal
Bury St Edmunds (two members)	Earl Jermyn	Conservative
Bury St Edmunds (two members)	John Stuart	Conservative
Buteshire	Hon. James Stuart-Wortley	Peelite
== C ==
Constituency	MP	Party
Caernarvon	William Bulkeley Hughes	Conservative
Caernarvonshire	Edward Douglas-Pennant	Conservative
Caithness	George Traill	Liberal
Calne	The Earl of Shelburne	Whig
Cambridge (two members)	Kenneth Macaulay	Conservative
Cambridge (two members)	John Harvey Astell	Conservative
Cambridge University (two members)	Henry Goulburn	Peelite
Cambridge University (two members)	Loftus Wigram	Conservative
Cambridgeshire (Three members)	Hon. Eliot Yorke	Conservative
Cambridgeshire (Three members)	Lord George Manners	Conservative
Cambridgeshire (Three members)	Edward Ball	Conservative
Canterbury (two members)	Henry Plumptre Gipps	Conservative
Canterbury (two members)	Henry Butler-Johnstone	Conservative
Cardiff	Walter Coffin	Liberal
Cardigan	Pryse Loveden	Liberal
Cardiganshire	William Edward Powell	Conservative
Carlisle (two members)	Sir James Graham, Bt	Peelite
Carlisle (two members)	Joseph Ferguson	Whig
Carlow	John Sadleir	Irish
County Carlow (two members)	Henry Bruen	Conservative
County Carlow (two members)	John Ball	Irish
Carmarthen	David Morris	Reformer
Carmarthenshire (two members)	David Davies	Conservative
Carmarthenshire (two members)	David Jones	Conservative
Carrickfergus	Wellington Stapleton-Cotton	Conservative
Cashel	Sir Timothy O'Brien, Bt	Irish
Cavan (two members)	Sir John Young, Bt	Peelite
Cavan (two members)	James Pierce Maxwell	Conservative
Chatham	Sir Frederick Smith	Conservative
Cheltenham	Hon. Craven Berkeley	Liberal
Cheshire North (two members)	William Egerton	Conservative
Cheshire North (two members)	George Legh	Conservative
Cheshire South (two members)	Sir Philip Grey Egerton, Bt	Conservative
Cheshire South (two members)	John Tollemache	Conservative
Chester (two members)	Hugh Grosvenor	Whig
Chester (two members)	William Owen Stanley	Whig
Chichester (two members)	John Abel Smith	Whig
Chichester (two members)	Lord Henry Lennox	Conservative
Chippenham (two members)	Joseph Neeld	Conservative
Chippenham (two members)	Henry George Boldero	Conservative
Christchurch	John Edward Walcott	Conservative
Cirencester (two members)	Joseph Mullings	Conservative
Cirencester (two members)	Hon. Ashley Ponsonby	Whig
Clackmannanshire and Kinross-shire	James Johnstone	Liberal
Clare (two members)	Sir John Forster Fitzgerald	Liberal
Clare (two members)	Cornelius O’Brien	Irish
Clitheroe	Mathew Wilson	Liberal
Clonmel	Hon. Cecil Lawless	Irish
Cockermouth (two members)	Henry Aglionby Aglionby	Whig
Cockermouth (two members)	Hon. Henry Wyndham	Conservative
Colchester (two members)	John Manners	Conservative
Colchester (two members)	William Hawkins	Conservative
Coleraine	Lord Naas	Conservative
Cork City (two members)	Francis Murphy	Irish
Cork City (two members)	William Trant Fagan	Irish
County Cork (two members)	Edmond Roche	Liberal
County Cork (two members)	Vincent Scully	Liberal
East Cornwall (two members)	Thomas Agar-Robartes	Whig
East Cornwall (two members)	Nicholas Kendall	Conservative
West Cornwall (two members)	Edward Wynne-Pendarves	Liberal
West Cornwall (two members)	Sir Charles Lemon, Bt	Whig
Coventry (two members)	Edward Ellice	Liberal
Coventry (two members)	Charles Geach	Whig
Cricklade (two members)	John Neeld	Conservative
Cricklade (two members)	Ambrose Goddard	Conservative
East Cumberland (two members)	Hon. Charles Howard	Liberal
East Cumberland (two members)	William Marshall	Liberal
West Cumberland (two members)	Henry Lowther	Conservative
West Cumberland (two members)	Samuel Irton	Conservative
== D ==
Constituency	MP	Party
Dartmouth	Sir Thomas Herbert	Conservative
Denbigh Boroughs	Frederick Richard West	Peelite
Denbighshire (two members)	Sir Watkin Williams-Wynn, Bt	Conservative
Denbighshire (two members)	Robert Myddleton-Biddulph	Liberal
Derby (two members)	Michael Thomas Bass	Whig
Derby (two members)	Thomas Horsfall	Conservative
Derbyshire North (two members)	Lord George Cavendish	Whig
Derbyshire North (two members)	William Evans	Liberal
Derbyshire South (two members)	Charles Robert Colvile	Peelite
Derbyshire South (two members)	William Mundy	Conservative
Devizes (two members)	George Heneage	Conservative
Devizes (two members)	John Neilson Gladstone	Conservative
Devonport (two members)	Henry Tufnell	Liberal
Devonport (two members)	Sir George Berkeley	Conservative
North Devon (two members)	Sir Thomas Dyke Acland, Bt	Conservative
North Devon (two members)	Lewis William Buck	Conservative
South Devon (two members)	Sir John Yarde-Buller, Bt	Conservative
South Devon (two members)	Sir Ralph Lopes, Bt	Conservative
Donegal (two members)	Sir Edmund Hayes, Bt	Conservative
Donegal (two members)	Thomas Conolly	Conservative
Dorchester (two members)	Henry Sturt	Conservative
Dorchester (two members)	Richard Brinsley Sheridan	Liberal
Dorset (Three members)	George Bankes	Conservative
Dorset (Three members)	Henry Seymer	Conservative
Dorset (Three members)	John Floyer	Conservative
Dover (two members)	Edward Royd Rice	Liberal
Dover (two members)	Viscount Chelsea	Conservative
Down (two members)	Lord Edwin Hill	Conservative
Down (two members)	David Ker	Conservative
Downpatrick	Hon. Charles Hardinge	Conservative
Drogheda	James McCann	Irish
Droitwich	Sir John Pakington, Bt	Conservative
Dublin (two members)	Edward Grogan	Conservative
Dublin (two members)	John Vance	Conservative
County Dublin (two members)	James Hans Hamilton	Conservative
County Dublin (two members)	Thomas Edward Taylor	Conservative
Dublin University (two members)	George Alexander Hamilton	Conservative
Dublin University (two members)	Joseph Napier	Conservative
Dudley	John Benbow	Conservative
Dumfries	William Ewart	Liberal
Dumfriesshire	Viscount Drumlanrig	Conservative
Dunbartonshire	Alexander Smollett	Conservative
Dundalk	George Bowyer	Irish
Dundee	George Duncan	Liberal
Dungannon	William Knox	Conservative
Dungarvan	John Maguire	Irish
Durham City (two members)	Thomas Granger	Whig
Durham City (two members)	Sir William Atherton	Liberal
North Durham (two members)	Robert Duncombe Shafto	Liberal
North Durham (two members)	Viscount Seaham	Conservative
South Durham (two members)	Harry Vane	Whig
South Durham (two members)	James Farrer	Conservative
== E ==
Constituency	MP	Party
East Retford (two members)	The Viscount Galway	Conservative
East Retford (two members)	Hon. William Duncombe	Conservative
Edinburgh (two members)	Charles Cowan	Liberal
Edinburgh (two members)	Thomas Babington Macaulay	Liberal
Elgin	George Skene Duff	Liberal
Elginshire and Nairnshire	Charles Cumming-Bruce	Conservative
Ennis	John FitzGerald	Irish
Enniskillen	James Whiteside	Conservative
Essex North (two members)	Sir John Tyrell, Bt	Conservative
Essex North (two members)	William Beresford	Conservative
Essex South (two members)	Thomas William Bramston	Conservative
Essex South (two members)	Sir William Bowyer-Smith, Bt	Conservative
Evesham (two members)	Sir Henry Willoughby, Bt	Conservative
Evesham (two members)	Grenville Berkeley	Liberal
Exeter (two members)	Edward Divett	Liberal
Exeter (two members)	Sir John Duckworth, Bt	Conservative
Eye	Edward Kerrison	Conservative
== F ==
Constituency	MP	Party
Falkirk Burghs	James Baird	Conservative
Fermanagh (two members)	Mervyn Edward Archdale	Conservative
Fermanagh (two members)	Sir Arthur Brooke, Bt	Conservative
Fife	John Fergus	Reformer
Finsbury (two members)	Thomas Slingsby Duncombe	Liberal
Finsbury (two members)	Thomas Challis	Liberal
Flint	Sir John Hanmer, Bt	Liberal
Flintshire	Hon. Edward Lloyd-Mostyn	Liberal
Forfarshire	Hon. Lauderdale Maule	Liberal
Frome	Hon. Robert Edward Boyle	Liberal
== G ==
Constituency	MP	Party
Galway Borough (two members)	Martin Blake	Irish
Galway Borough (two members)	Anthony O'Flaherty	Irish
County Galway (two members)	Thomas Burke	Irish Whig
County Galway (two members)	Thomas Bellew	Irish
Gateshead	Sir William Hutt	Liberal
Glamorganshire (two members)	Christopher Rice Mansel Talbot	Liberal
Glamorganshire (two members)	Sir George Tyler	Conservative
Glasgow (two members)	John McGregor	Liberal
Glasgow (two members)	Alexander Hastie	Liberal
Gloucester (two members)	Maurice Berkeley	Liberal
Gloucester (two members)	William Philip Price	Liberal
Gloucestershire East (two members)	Sir Christopher William Codrington	Conservative
Gloucestershire East (two members)	The Marquess of Worcester	Conservative
Gloucestershire West (two members)	Robert Hale	Conservative
Gloucestershire West (two members)	Robert Kingscote	Liberal
Grantham (two members)	Glynne Earle-Welby	Conservative
Grantham (two members)	Lord Montagu Graham	Conservative
Great Grimsby	Viscount Glerawly	Conservative
Great Marlow (two members)	Thomas Peers Williams	Conservative
Great Marlow (two members)	Brownlow William Knox	Conservative
Great Yarmouth (two members)	Charles Rumbold	Whig
Great Yarmouth (two members)	Sir Edmund Lacon, Bt	Conservative
Greenock	Alexander Murray Dunlop	Liberal
Greenwich (two members)	Peter Rolt	Conservative
Greenwich (two members)	Montague Chambers	Liberal
Guildford (two members)	Ross Donnelly Mangles	Liberal
Guildford (two members)	James Bell	Liberal
== H ==
Constituency	MP	Party
Haddington	Sir Henry Ferguson-Davie, Bt	Liberal
Haddingtonshire	Lord Elcho	Peelite
Halifax (two members)	Sir Charles Wood, Bt	Liberal
Halifax (two members)	Francis Crossley	Liberal
Hampshire North (two members)	Charles Shaw-Lefevre	Liberal, Speaker
Hampshire North (two members)	Melville Portal	Peelite
Hampshire South (two members)	Henry Combe Compton	Conservative
Hampshire South (two members)	Lord William Cholmondeley	Conservative
Harwich (two members)	George Sandford	Conservative
Harwich (two members)	David Waddington	Conservative
Hastings (two members)	Musgrave Brisco	Conservative
Hastings (two members)	Patrick Robertson	Conservative
Haverfordwest	John Henry Scourfield	Peelite
Helston	Sir Richard Vyvyan, Bt	Conservative
Hereford (two members)	Sir Robert Price, Bt	Whig
Hereford (two members)	Henry Morgan-Clifford	Liberal
Herefordshire (Three members)	Thomas Booker-Blakemore	Conservative
Herefordshire (Three members)	James King	Conservative
Herefordshire (Three members)	Hon. Charles Bateman-Hanbury	Conservative
Hertford (two members)	Hon. William Cowper-Temple	Whig
Hertford (two members)	Thomas Chambers	Liberal
Hertfordshire (Three members)	Thomas Plumer Halsey	Conservative
Hertfordshire (Three members)	Sir Henry Meux, Bt	Conservative
Hertfordshire (Three members)	Sir Edward Bulwer-Lytton, Bt	Conservative
Honiton (two members)	Joseph Locke	Liberal
Honiton (two members)	Sir James Hogg, Bt	Peelite
Horsham	William Vesey-FitzGerald	Conservative
Huddersfield	William Crompton-Stansfield	Reformer
Huntingdon (two members)	Jonathan Peel	Conservative
Huntingdon (two members)	Thomas Baring	Conservative
Huntingdonshire (two members)	Edward Fellowes	Conservative
Huntingdonshire (two members)	Viscount Mandeville	Conservative
Hythe	Edward Brockman	Liberal
== I ==
Constituency	MP	Party
Inverness Burghs	Alexander Matheson	Liberal
Inverness-shire	Henry Baillie	Conservative
Ipswich (two members)	John Cobbold	Conservative
Ipswich (two members)	Hugh Adair	Liberal
Isle of Wight	Francis Venables-Vernon-Harcourt	Conservative
== K ==
Constituency	MP	Party
Kendal	George Glyn	Liberal
Kent East (two members)	William Deedes	Conservative
Kent East (two members)	Sir Edward Dering, Bt	Liberal
Kent West (two members)	Sir Edmund Filmer, Bt	Conservative
Kent West (two members)	William Masters Smith	Conservative
Kerry (two members)	Henry Arthur Herbert	Conservative
Kerry (two members)	Valentine Browne	Whig
Kidderminster	Robert Lowe	Liberal
Kildare (two members)	William H. F. Cogan	Liberal
Kildare (two members)	David O'Connor Henchy	Liberal
Kilkenny City	Michael Sullivan	Repealer
County Kilkenny (two members)	John Greene	Repealer
County Kilkenny (two members)	William Shee	Liberal
Kilmarnock Burghs	Hon. Edward Pleydell-Bouverie	Liberal
Kincardineshire	Hon. Hugh Arbuthnott	Conservative
King's County (two members)	Patrick O'Brien	Liberal
King's County (two members)	Loftus Henry Bland	Liberal
King's Lynn (two members)	Viscount Jocelyn	Conservative
King's Lynn (two members)	Edward Stanley	Conservative
Kingston upon Hull (two members)	James Clay	Reformer
Kingston upon Hull (two members)	Viscount Goderich	Liberal
Kinsale	John Heard	Whig
Kirkcaldy District of Burghs	Robert Munro-Ferguson	Whig
Kirkcudbright	John Mackie	Liberal
Knaresborough (two members)	Joshua Westhead	Liberal
Knaresborough (two members)	John Dent	Liberal
== L ==
Constituency	MP	Party
Lambeth (two members)	William Williams	Radical
Lambeth (two members)	William Arthur Wilkinson	Liberal
Lanarkshire	William Lockhart	Conservative
Lancashire North (two members)	John Wilson-Patten	Conservative
Lancashire North (two members)	James Heywood	Liberal
Lancashire South (two members)	William Brown	Liberal
Lancashire South (two members)	John Cheetham	Liberal
Lancaster (two members)	Robert Armstrong	Reformer
Lancaster (two members)	Samuel Gregson	Liberal
Launceston	Hon. Josceline Percy	Conservative
Leeds (two members)	Matthew Talbot Baines	Liberal
Leeds (two members)	Sir George Goodman	Liberal
Leicester (two members)	Sir Joshua Walmsley	Liberal
Leicester (two members)	Richard Gardner	Radical
Leicestershire North (two members)	Edward Farnham	Conservative
Leicestershire North (two members)	The Marquess of Granby	Conservative
Leicestershire South (two members)	Sir Henry Halford, Bt	Conservative
Leicestershire South (two members)	Charles Packe	Conservative
Leith Burghs	James Moncreiff	Whig
Leitrim (two members)	Hugh Lyons-Montgomery	Conservative
Leitrim (two members)	John Brady	Liberal
Leominster (two members)	George Arkwright	Conservative
Leominster (two members)	John George Phillimore	Liberal
Lewes (two members)	Hon. Henry FitzRoy	Peelite
Lewes (two members)	Hon. Henry Brand	Liberal
Lichfield (two members)	Lord Alfred Paget	Liberal
Lichfield (two members)	Thomas Anson	Liberal
Limerick City (two members)	Robert Potter	Liberal
Limerick City (two members)	Francis William Russell	Irish
County Limerick (two members)	William Monsell	Liberal
County Limerick (two members)	Wyndham Goold	Liberal
Lincoln (two members)	Colonel Sibthorp	Conservative
Lincoln (two members)	George Heneage	Conservative
Lincolnshire North (two members)	Robert Christopher	Conservative
Lincolnshire North (two members)	James Stanhope	Conservative
Lincolnshire South (two members)	Sir John Trollope, Bt	Conservative
Lincolnshire South (two members)	Lord Burghley	Conservative
Linlithgowshire	George Dundas	Conservative
Lisburn	James Emerson Tennent	Conservative
Liskeard	Richard Crowder	Liberal
Liverpool (two members)	Charles Turner	Conservative
Liverpool (two members)	William Forbes Mackenzie	Conservative
The City of London (Four members)	John Masterman	Conservative
The City of London (Four members)	Lord John Russell	Liberal
The City of London (Four members)	Lionel de Rothschild	Liberal
The City of London (Four members)	Sir James Duke, Bt	Whig
Londonderry City	Sir Robert Ferguson, Bt	Whig
County Londonderry (two members)	Theobald Jones	Conservative
County Londonderry (two members)	Thomas Bateson	Conservative
County Longford (two members)	Richard Fox	Liberal
County Longford (two members)	Fulke Greville-Nugent	Liberal
County Louth (two members)	Chichester Fortescue	Liberal
County Louth (two members)	Tristram Kennedy	Liberal
Ludlow (two members)	Hon. Robert Windsor-Clive	Conservative
Ludlow (two members)	William Powlett	Conservative
Lyme Regis	William Pinney	Liberal
Lymington (two members)	Edward John Hutchins	Liberal
Lymington (two members)	Sir John Rivett-Carnac	Conservative
== M ==
Constituency	MP	Party
Macclesfield (two members)	John Brocklehurst	Reformer
Macclesfield (two members)	Edward Egerton	Peelite
Maidstone (two members)	George Dodd	Conservative
Maidstone (two members)	James Whatman	Liberal
Maldon (two members)	Charles du Cane	Conservative
Maldon (two members)	Taverner John Miller	Conservative
Mallow	Sir Charles Denham Jephson-Norreys, Bt	Whig
Malmesbury	Thomas Luce	Liberal
Malton (two members)	Sir Evelyn Denison	Reformer
Malton (two members)	Hon. Charles Wentworth-FitzWilliam	Liberal
Manchester (two members)	Thomas Milner Gibson	Liberal
Manchester (two members)	John Bright	Radical
Marlborough (two members)	Ernest Brudenell-Bruce	Conservative
Marlborough (two members)	Henry Bingham Baring	Conservative
Marylebone (two members)	Sir Benjamin Hall, Bt	Liberal
Marylebone (two members)	Lord Dudley Stuart	Liberal
Mayo (two members)	George Henry Moore	Liberal
Mayo (two members)	George Higgins	Liberal
Meath (two members)	Matthew Corbally	Liberal
Meath (two members)	Frederick Lucas	Liberal
Merioneth	William Wynne	Conservative
Merthyr Tydvil	Henry Bruce	Liberal
Middlesex (two members)	Robert Grosvenor	Whig
Middlesex (two members)	Ralph Bernal Osborne	Liberal
Midhurst	Spencer Horatio Walpole	Conservative
Midlothian	Sir John Hope	Conservative
Monaghan (two members)	Charles Powell Leslie	Conservative
Monaghan (two members)	Sir George Forster, Bt	Conservative
Monmouth Boroughs	Crawshay Bailey	Conservative
Monmouthshire (two members)	Octavius Morgan	Conservative
Monmouthshire (two members)	Edward Arthur Somerset	Conservative
Montgomery	David Pugh	Conservative
Montgomeryshire	Herbert Williams-Wynn	Conservative
Montrose	Joseph Hume	Radical
Morpeth	Hon. Edward Howard	Whig
== N ==
Constituency	MP	Party
Newark (two members)	John Manners-Sutton	Conservative
Newark (two members)	Granville Harcourt-Vernon	Peelite
Newcastle-under-Lyme (two members)	Samuel Christy	Conservative
Newcastle-under-Lyme (two members)	William Jackson	Liberal
Newcastle-upon-Tyne (two members)	Thomas Emerson Headlam	Liberal
Newcastle-upon-Tyne (two members)	John Blackett	Liberal
Newport (two members)	William Biggs	Radical
Newport (two members)	William Nathaniel Massey	Liberal
New Ross	Charles Gavan Duffy	Liberal
Newry	William Kirk	Liberal
New Shoreham (two members)	Sir Charles Burrell, Bt	Conservative
New Shoreham (two members)	Lord Alexander Gordon-Lennox	Conservative
Norfolk East (two members)	Edmond Wodehouse	Conservative
Norfolk East (two members)	Henry Negus Burroughes	Conservative
Norfolk West (two members)	William Bagge	Conservative
Norfolk West (two members)	George Bentinck	Conservative
Northallerton	William Battie-Wrightson	Whig
Northampton (two members)	Robert Vernon	Liberal
Northampton (two members)	Raikes Currie	Liberal
North Northamptonshire (two members)	Thomas Maunsell	Conservative
North Northamptonshire (two members)	Augustus Stafford	Conservative
South Northamptonshire (two members)	Richard Vyse	Conservative
South Northamptonshire (two members)	Rainald Knightley	Conservative
Northumberland North (two members)	Lord Ossulston	Conservative
Northumberland North (two members)	Lord Lovaine	Conservative
Northumberland South (two members)	Wentworth Beaumont	Liberal
Northumberland South (two members)	Lord Eslington	Peelite
Norwich (two members)	Morton Peto	Liberal
Norwich (two members)	Edward Warner	Reformer
Nottingham (two members)	John Walter	Liberal
Nottingham (two members)	Edward Strutt	Liberal
Nottinghamshire North (two members)	Lord Henry Bentinck	Conservative
Nottinghamshire North (two members)	Lord Robert Clinton	Liberal
Nottinghamshire South (two members)	William Hodgson Barrow	Conservative
Nottinghamshire South (two members)	Viscount Newark	Conservative
== O ==
Constituency	MP	Party
Oldham (two members)	John Duncuft	Conservative
Oldham (two members)	John Morgan Cobbett	Liberal
Orkney and Shetland	Frederick Dundas	Liberal
Oxford (two members)	James Haughton Langston	Liberal
Oxford (two members)	Sir William Wood	Liberal
Oxfordshire (Three members)	George Harcourt	Conservative
Oxfordshire (Three members)	J. W. Henley	Conservative
Oxfordshire (Three members)	John North	Conservative
Oxford University (two members)	Sir Robert Inglis, Bt	Conservative
Oxford University (two members)	William Ewart Gladstone	Peelite
== P ==
Constituency	MP	Party
Paisley	Archibald Hastie	Reformer
Peeblesshire	Sir Graham Graham-Montgomery, Bt	Conservative
Pembroke	Sir John Owen, Bt	Conservative
Pembrokeshire	Viscount Emlyn	Conservative
Penryn and Falmouth (two members)	Howel Gwyn	Conservative
Penryn and Falmouth (two members)	James William Freshfield	Peelite
Perth	Hon. Arthur Kinnaird	Liberal
Perthshire	Sir William Stirling-Maxwell, Bt	Conservative
Peterborough (two members)	Hon. George Wentworth-FitzWilliam	Liberal
Peterborough (two members)	Richard Watson	Liberal
Petersfield	Sir William Joliffe, Bt	Conservative
Plymouth (two members)	Robert Collier	Liberal
Plymouth (two members)	Charles Mare	Conservative
Pontefract (two members)	Richard Monckton Milnes	Conservative
Pontefract (two members)	Benjamin Oliveira	Liberal
Poole (two members)	Henry Danby Seymour	Liberal
Poole (two members)	George Franklyn	Conservative
Portarlington	Francis Plunkett Dunne	Conservative
Portsmouth (two members)	Sir Francis Baring, Bt	Liberal
Portsmouth (two members)	Charles Monck	Liberal
Preston (two members)	Sir George Strickland, Bt	Reformer
Preston (two members)	Robert Townley Parker	Conservative
== Q ==
Constituency	MP	Party
Queen's County (two members)	Michael Dunne	Liberal
Queen's County (two members)	Sir Charles Coote, Bt	Conservative
== R ==
Constituency	MP	Party
Radnor	Sir Thomas Frankland Lewis, Bt	Liberal
Radnorshire	Sir John Walsh, Bt	Conservative
Reading (two members)	Francis Piggott	Liberal
Reading (two members)	Sir Henry Singer Keating	Liberal
Reigate	Thomas Somers-Cocks	Conservative
Renfrewshire	William Mure	Conservative
Richmond (two members)	Henry Rich	Liberal
Richmond (two members)	Marmaduke Wyvill	Liberal
Ripon (two members)	Hon. Edwin Lascelles	Conservative
Ripon (two members)	William Beckett	Conservative
Rochdale	Edward Miall	Radical
Rochester (two members)	Hon. Francis Child Villiers	Conservative
Rochester (two members)	Sir Thomas Herbert Maddock	Conservative
Roscommon (two members)	Fitzstephen French	Whig
Roscommon (two members)	Oliver Grace	Whig
Ross and Cromarty	Sir James Matheson, Bt	Liberal
Roxburghshire	Hon. John Elliot	Liberal
Rutland (two members)	Sir Gilbert Heathcote, Bt	Reformer
Rutland (two members)	Hon. Gerard Noel	Conservative
Rye	William Alexander Mackinnon	Liberal
== S ==
Constituency	MP	Party
St Andrews	Edward Ellice	Liberal
St Ives	Robert Laffan	Peelite
Salford	Joseph Brotherton	Liberal
Salisbury (two members)	William Chaplin	Liberal
Salisbury (two members)	Charles Baring Wall	Liberal
Sandwich (two members)	Lord Charles Clinton	Conservative
Sandwich (two members)	James Macgregor	Conservative
Scarborough (two members)	Sir John Vanden-Bempde-Johnstone, Bt	Conservative
Scarborough (two members)	The Earl of Mulgrave	Whig
Selkirkshire	Allan Eliott-Lockhart	Conservative
Shaftesbury	Hon. Henry Portman	Liberal
Sheffield (two members)	John Arthur Roebuck	Radical
Sheffield (two members)	George Hadfield	Liberal/Radical
Shrewsbury (two members)	Edward Holmes Baldock	Conservative
Shrewsbury (two members)	George Tomline	Liberal
Shropshire North (two members)	William Ormsby-Gore	Conservative
Shropshire North (two members)	John Dod	Conservative
Shropshire South (two members)	Hon. Robert Clive	Conservative
Shropshire South (two members)	Viscount Newport	Conservative
Sligo	Charles Towneley	Liberal
County Sligo (two members)	Sir Robert Gore-Booth, Bt	Conservative
County Sligo (two members)	Richard Swift	Liberal
Somerset East (two members)	William Miles	Conservative
Somerset East (two members)	William Knatchbull	Conservative
Somerset West (two members)	Charles Moody	Conservative
Somerset West (two members)	William Gore-Langton	Conservative
Southampton (two members)	Sir Alexander Cockburn, Bt	Liberal
Southampton (two members)	Brodie McGhie Willcox	Liberal
South Shields	Robert Ingham	Whig
Southwark (two members)	Sir William Molesworth, Bt	Radical
Southwark (two members)	Apsley Pellatt	Liberal
Stafford (two members)	John Wise	Whig
Stafford (two members)	Arthur Otway	Liberal
Staffordshire North (two members)	Charles Adderley	Conservative
Staffordshire North (two members)	Smith Child	Conservative
Staffordshire South (two members)	Hon. George Anson	Liberal
Staffordshire South (two members)	Viscount Lewisham	Conservative
Stamford (two members)	John Charles Herries	Conservative
Stamford (two members)	Sir Frederic Thesiger	Conservative
Stirling	Sir James Anderson	Liberal
Stirlingshire	William Forbes	Conservative
Stockport (two members)	James Kershaw	Liberal
Stockport (two members)	John Benjamin Smith	Radical
Stoke-upon-Trent (two members)	John Lewis Ricardo	Liberal
Stoke-upon-Trent (two members)	Hon. Frederick Leveson-Gower	Liberal
Stroud (two members)	George Poulett Scrope	Liberal
Stroud (two members)	Lord Moreton	Liberal
Suffolk East (two members)	Sir Edward Gooch, Bt	Conservative
Suffolk East (two members)	Sir Fitzroy Kelly	Conservative
Suffolk West (two members)	Harry Spencer Waddington	Conservative
Suffolk West (two members)	Philip Bennett	Conservative
Sunderland (two members)	George Hudson	Conservative
Sunderland (two members)	William Digby Seymour	Liberal
Surrey East (two members)	Hon. Peter King	Liberal
Surrey East (two members)	Thomas Alcock	Reformer
Surrey West (two members)	Henry Drummond	Conservative
Surrey West (two members)	William John Evelyn	Conservative
Sussex East (two members)	Augustus Fuller	Conservative
Sussex East (two members)	Charles Frewen	Conservative
Sussex West (two members)	The Earl of March	Conservative
Sussex West (two members)	Richard Prime	Conservative
Sutherland	The Marquess of Stafford	Liberal
Swansea District	John Henry Vivian	Liberal
== T ==
Constituency	MP	Party
Tamworth (two members)	John Townshend	Liberal
Tamworth (two members)	Sir Robert Peel, Bt	Peelite
Taunton (two members)	Henry Labouchere	Liberal
Taunton (two members)	Arthur Mills	Conservative
Tavistock (two members)	Samuel Carter	Radical
Tavistock (two members)	Hon. George Byng	Liberal
Tewkesbury (two members)	John Martin	Liberal
Tewkesbury (two members)	Humphrey Brown	Liberal
Thetford (two members)	The Earl of Euston	Liberal
Thetford (two members)	Hon. Francis Baring	Conservative
Thirsk	Sir William Payne-Gallwey, Bt	Conservative
Tipperary (two members)	Francis Scully	Repealer
Tipperary (two members)	James Sadleir	Liberal
Tiverton (two members)	John Heathcoat	Whig
Tiverton (two members)	The Viscount Palmerston	Liberal
Totnes (two members)	Edward Seymour	Liberal
Totnes (two members)	Thomas Mills	Liberal
Tower Hamlets (two members)	Sir William Clay, Bt	Liberal
Tower Hamlets (two members)	Charles Salisbury Butler	Liberal
Tralee	Maurice O'Connell	Irish
Truro (two members)	John Vivian	Conservative
Truro (two members)	Henry Vivian	Liberal
Tynemouth and North Shields	Hugh Taylor	Conservative
Tyrone (two members)	Hon. Henry Lowry-Corry	Conservative
Tyrone (two members)	Lord Claud Hamilton	Conservative
== W ==
Constituency	MP	Party
Wakefield	George Sandars	Conservative
Wallingford	Richard Malins	Conservative
Walsall	Charles Forster	Liberal
Wareham	John Erle-Drax	Conservative
Warrington	Gilbert Greenall	Conservative
Warwick (two members)	George Repton	Conservative
Warwick (two members)	Edward Greaves	Conservative
Warwickshire North (two members)	Charles Newdigate Newdegate	Conservative
Warwickshire North (two members)	Richard Spooner	Conservative
Warwickshire South (two members)	Lord Brooke	Conservative
Warwickshire South (two members)	Lord Guernsey	Conservative
Waterford City (two members)	Thomas Meager	Liberal
Waterford City (two members)	Robert Keating	Repealer
County Waterford (two members)	Nicholas Mahon Power	Liberal
County Waterford (two members)	Sir John Esmonde, Bt	Liberal
Wells (two members)	William Hayter	Whig
Wells (two members)	Robert Tudway	Conservative
Wenlock (two members)	Hon. George Weld-Forester	Conservative
Wenlock (two members)	James Milnes Gaskell	Conservative
Westbury	James Wilson	Liberal
Westmeath (two members)	William Magan	Liberal
Westmeath (two members)	William Pollard-Urquhart	Liberal
Westminster (two members)	Sir De Lacy Evans	Radical
Westminster (two members)	Sir John Shelley, Bt	Liberal
Westmorland (two members)	Hon. Henry Lowther	Conservative
Westmorland (two members)	William Thompson	Conservative
Wexford	John Devereux	Liberal
County Wexford (two members)	Patrick McMahon	Liberal
County Wexford (two members)	John George	Conservative
Weymouth and Melcombe Regis (two members)	William Freestun	Liberal
Weymouth and Melcombe Regis (two members)	George Butt	Conservative
Whitby	Robert Stephenson	Conservative
Whitehaven	Robert Hildyard	Conservative
Wick District	Samuel Laing	Liberal
Wicklow (two members)	Viscount Milton	Whig
Wicklow (two members)	William Wentworth FitzWilliam Dick	Conservative
Wigan (two members)	Hon. James Lindsay	Conservative
Wigan (two members)	Ralph Thicknesse	Liberal
Wigtown Burghs	Sir John McTaggart, Bt	Liberal
Wigtownshire	John Dalrymple	Whig
Wilton	Charles A'Court	Liberal
Wiltshire North (two members)	Walter Long	Conservative
Wiltshire North (two members)	T. H. S. Sotheron-Estcourt	Conservative
Wiltshire South (two members)	Sidney Herbert	Peelite
Wiltshire South (two members)	William Wyndham	Whig
Winchester (two members)	Sir James Buller East, Bt	Peelite
Winchester (two members)	John Bonham-Carter	Liberal
Windsor (two members)	Charles Grenfell	Whig
Windsor (two members)	Lord Charles Wellesley	Conservative
Wolverhampton (two members)	Hon. Charles Pelham Villiers	Radical
Wolverhampton (two members)	Thomas Thornely	Reformer
Woodstock	The Marquess of Blandford	Conservative
Worcester (two members)	Osman Ricardo	Liberal
Worcester (two members)	William Laslett	Liberal
Worcestershire East (two members)	George Rushout	Conservative
Worcestershire East (two members)	John Hodgetts-Foley	Liberal
Worcestershire West (two members)	Hon. Henry Lygon	Conservative
Worcestershire West (two members)	Frederick Knight	Conservative
Wycombe (two members)	Sir George Dashwood, Bt	Liberal
Wycombe (two members)	Martin Tucker Smith	Liberal
== Y ==
Constituency	MP	Party
York (two members)	John George Smyth	Conservative
York (two members)	William Milner	Whig
East Riding of Yorkshire (two members)	Beaumont Hotham	Conservative
East Riding of Yorkshire (two members)	Arthur Duncombe	Conservative
North Riding of Yorkshire (two members)	Edward Stillingfleet Cayley	Whig
North Riding of Yorkshire (two members)	Hon. Octavius Duncombe	Conservative
West Riding of Yorkshire (two members)	Richard Cobden	Radical
West Riding of Yorkshire (two members)	Edmund Beckett	Conservative
Youghal	Isaac Butt	Conservative

== Changes ==
=== 1852 ===
- 1852: Following the general election 48 MPs, elected as Liberals in Ireland, formed the Independent Irish Party. They included William Keogh (Athlone), John Sadleir (Carlow), John Ball (County Carlow), Sir Timothy O'Brien, Bt (Cashel), Cornelius O'Brien (Clare) unseated on petition, Hon. Cecil Lawless (Clonmel), Francis Murphy (Cork), William Trant Fagan (Cork), James McCann (Drogheda), George Bowyer (Dundalk), Jogn Maguire (Dungarvan), John Fitzgerald (Ennis), Anthony O'Flaherty (Galway), Martin Blake (Galway), Sir Thomas Burke, Bt (County Galway), Thomas Bellew (County Galway).

=== 1853 ===
- 1 January 1853: John Sadleir (Independent Irish Party-Carlow) accepted office in the Aberdeen coalition and was defeated seeking re-election as a Liberal on 20 January 1853.
- April 1853: William Keogh (Independent Irish Party-Athlone) accepted office in the Aberdeen coalition and was re-elected as a Liberal on 23 April 1853.

Incomplete

== See also ==
- List of parliaments of the United Kingdom
- UK general election, 1852
