= Sir Valentine Blake, 12th Baronet =

Irish lawyer and politician

Sir Valentine Blake

Member of Parliament for Galway Borough
- In office 5 July 1841 – January 1847 Serving with Martin Joseph Blake
- Preceded by: Andrew Henry Lynch; Lachlan MacLachlan
- Succeeded by: James Henry Monahan; Martin Joseph Blake
- In office 18 June 1813 – 13 April 1820
- Preceded by: Frederick Ponsonby
- Succeeded by: Michael Prendergast

Personal details
- Born: 23 June 1780
- Died: January 1847 (aged 66) Paris, France
- Party: Repeal Association
- Other political affiliations: Tory

Sir Valentine John Blake, 12th Baronet (23 June 1780 – January 1847) was an Irish Repeal Association and Tory politician.

Blake was the son of Sir John Blake, 11th Baronet and his first wife, and cousin, Eleanor née Lycnh. He was educated at Trinity College Dublin and then admitted to Lincoln's Inn in 1801. He first married, on 8 August 1803, Eliza Donellan, daughter of Joseph Donellan, and they had two sons and three daughters—including Sir Thomas Edward Blake, 13th Baronet (1805–1875) and John Francis Blake (1809–1888), before her death in 1836. After this, he remarried, on 8 April 1843, Julia Sophia MacDonnell, daughter of Robert MacDonnell, with whom he had one son, Valentine Charles Blake (born 1844).

In an attempt to put family affairs in order, Blake was convinced to stand for election for Galway Borough at the 1812 general election. While he was defeated, the result was the next year overturned and Blake was then declared elected, professing to be "warmly attached to the government". During this period, he frequently voted in support of Catholic relief, including extending the franchise in his constituency to Catholics—although this was later stripped out of the bill. Despite his earlier assurances, Blake did not establish a working relationship with the government either at Westminster or Dublin, holding out for the entire patronage of Galway town in order to maintain his election prospects. In the end, Blake felt he was "cheated of his rights" and came to see Robert Peel, who was then Chief Secretary for Ireland, as a Machiavellian figure.

The next few years of his parliamentary career saw Blake unsuccessfully apply to be clerk of the hanaper, or another office. After several attempts, he reminded the prime minister of the "unrewarded services" of his ancestor, Sir Walter Blake, 6th Baronet, but Robert Jenkinson, 2nd Earl of Liverpool was still unable to help him. Despite being often absent from parliament and declaring he would not attend unless it was necessary—including voting prematurely in defence of the Irish master of the rolls bill—he held the seat until 1820, when he was defeated.

After also failing to win back the seat in 1830 and then as a Repeal Association candidate at a by-election in 1838, he was re-elected as a Repeal Association MP for the borough in 1841, and then held the seat until his death in 1847.

He succeeded to the Baronetcy of Menlough in 1834 upon the death of his father. Upon his own death in 1847, the title was inherited by his son, Thomas.

Parliament of the United Kingdom
Preceded by Frederick Ponsonby	Member of Parliament for Galway Borough; 1813–1820	Succeeded by Michael Prendergast
Preceded by Andrew Henry Lynch; Lachlan MacLachlan	Member of Parliament for Galway Borough; 1841–1847; With: Martin Joseph Blake	Succeeded by James Henry Monahan; Martin Joseph Blake
Baronetage of the United Kingdom
Preceded by John Blake	Baronet (of Menlough); 1834 – 1847	Succeeded by Thomas Edward Blake
