= HMS Castor (1832) =

1832 fifth rate frigate of the British Royal Navy

History

United Kingdom
- Name: HMS Castor
- Ordered: 13 May 1828
- Builder: Chatham Dockyard
- Laid down: January 1830
- Launched: 2 May 1832
- Commissioned: June 1832
- Reclassified: Training ship from January 1860; Royal Naval Reserve training ship from April 1862
- Fate: Sold on 25 August 1902

General characteristics
- Class & type: 36-gun fifth rate ship of the line
- Displacement: 1,808 tons
- Tons burthen: 1,283 bm
- Length: 159 ft (48 m) (overall); 133 ft 8 in (40.74 m) (gundeck)
- Beam: 42 ft 6 in (12.95 m)
- Draught: 13 ft 6 in (4.11 m)
- Propulsion: Sails
- Sail plan: Full-rigged ship
- Complement: 275
- Armament: 36 guns: Upper gundeck: 22 × 32 pdrs; Quarterdeck: 10 × 18 pdrs; Forecastle: 4 × 18 pdrs; After later refit: Upper gundeck: 18 × 32 pdrs and 4 × 68-pounders; Quarterdeck: 10 × 32 pdr gunnades; Forecastle: 4 × 32pdr gunnades

HMS Castor, launched and commissioned in 1832, was a 36-gun fifth rate frigate of the Royal Navy and the third naval ship to bear the name.

== Construction ==
Castor was built at Chatham Dockyard and launched on 2 May 1832. She was one of a two ship class of frigates, built to an 1828 design by Sir Robert Seppings, and derived from the earlier Stag class. The Castor class had a further 13 inches (33 cm) of beam to mount the heavier ordnance. Castor cost a total of £38,292, to be fitted for sea.

== Naval service ==
Her first captain was Lord John Hay, and by September 1832 Castor was at Lisbon.

On 27 August 1834 she collided with the Revenue Cutter Cameleon off South Foreland, Dover, sinking Cameleon with the loss of most of its crew. This incident led to the Court Martial of officers and crew of Castor on 6 September 1834 in Plymouth. The officers were acquitted but the lieutenant of the watch was dismissed from the service, it having been admitted and proven that a proper watch had not been kept.

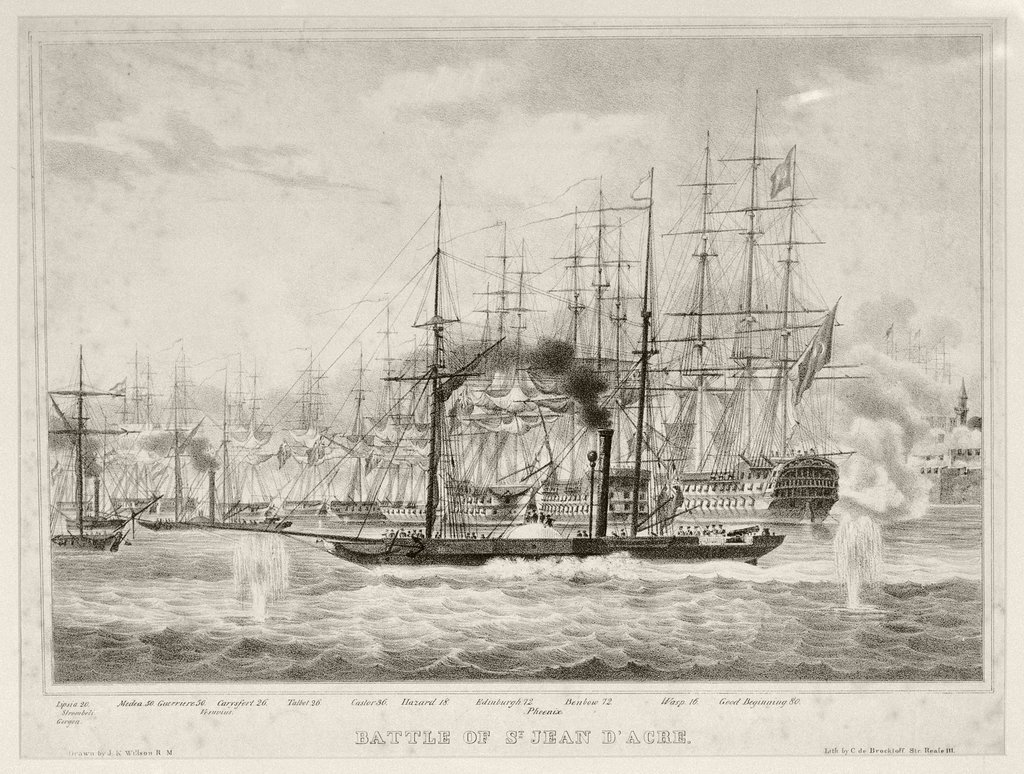
Castor is in this picture of the Battle of St. Jean d'Acre, 3 November 1840

She took part in the Egyptian–Ottoman War (1839–1841), also known as the Second Syrian War, when the British Mediterranean Fleet under Admiral Sir Robert Stopford, supported the Ottoman Empire and took action to compel the Egyptians to withdraw from Beirut. During the Oriental Crisis of 1840 Castor was involved in the bombardment of St. Jean d’Acre on 3 November 1840. Four sailors (Seamen John O'Brein, Silneck Thomas, Smith William and Weaver Frederick) were killed on board at the capture of St. Jean D'Acre. They were buried in Malta, in the Msida Bastion Cemetery and Historic Garden, Floriana, Malta, where a monument is still visible. After cruising on the coast of Ireland she was sent out to the East Indies Station; before being decommissioned at Chatham in 1842.

In 1845 Castor was on the China Station under the command of Captain Graham. Officers, seamen, and Royal Marines of Castor participated in the siege of Ruapekapeka Pā from 27 December 1845 to 11 January 1846 during the Flagstaff War in New Zealand. Seven sailors were killed in the battle to take the fortified stronghold that was built by the Māori.

In 1852 Castor was on the Cape of Good Hope Station under the command of Commodore Wyvill. She came to the assistance of HM Troopship Birkenhead, when the Birkenhead was wrecked on 26 February 1852.

== Training ship ==
Castor was used as a training ship from January 1860, and was a Royal Naval Reserve training ship at North Shields from April 1862, having been reduced to 22 guns. On 28 January 1885, she was run into by the steamship Mercator at South Shields, County Durham when Mercator was trying to avoid a collision with the steamship Winthorpe. Castor was eventually sold at Sheerness on 25 August 1902 for breaking up at Castle & Sons breakers yard in Woolwich.
