= William O'Shea =

Irish soldier and Member of Parliament (1840-1905)

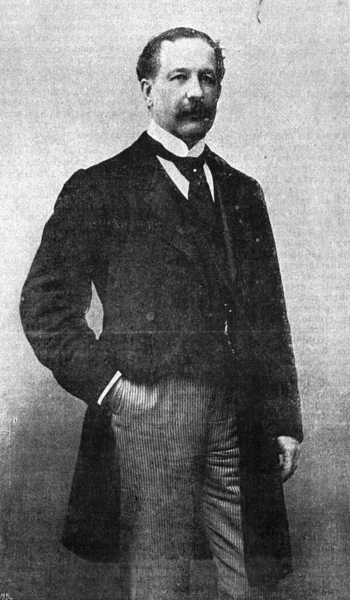
- O'Shea c. 1880

Member of Parliament for Galway Borough
- In office 1886–1886
- Preceded by: T. P. O'Connor
- Succeeded by: John Pinkerton

Member of Parliament for County Clare
- In office 1880–1885 Serving with James Patrick Mahon
- Preceded by: James Patrick Mahon; Lord Francis Conyngham
- Succeeded by: Constituency abolished

Personal details
- Born: 1840 Dublin, Ireland, UK
- Died: 22 April 1905 (aged 65)
- Party: Independent Nationalist
- Spouse: Katharine O'Shea (m. 1867; div. 1890)

Military service
- Allegiance: United Kingdom
- Branch/service: British Army
- Rank: Captain
- Unit: 18th Royal Hussars

Captain William Henry O'Shea (1840 – 22 April 1905) was an Irish soldier and Member of Parliament. He is best known for being the ex-husband of Katharine O'Shea, the long-time mistress of the Irish nationalist leader Charles Stewart Parnell.

== Life ==
Born in Dublin, O'Shea was commissioned into the British Army a cornet in the 18th Hussars in 1858. He purchased promotion to lieutenant in 1859 and captain in 1862, and retired in 1864. He then joined the South Herts Yeomanry Cavalry as a cornet in 1868, with promotion to lieutenant the following year, but resigned his yeomanry commission in 1870.

Around 1880, his wife, Essex-born Katharine O'Shea, entered into a relationship with the Irish nationalist leader Charles Stewart Parnell, with whom she had three children. O'Shea, who was already separated from his wife, knew of the relationship.

In 1882 when the Liberal government was secretly negotiating with Parnell for the terms of his release from Kilmainham Gaol where he was being held on suspicion of "treasonable practices", the President of the Board of Trade, Joseph Chamberlain, chose O'Shea as its intermediary, unaware of Parnell's affair with Mrs O'Shea or of the fact that the newly born first child of their liaison was dying. O'Shea spent six hours negotiating with Parnell in the prison, extracting the surprising concession that Parnell would tacitly support the Government after his release. It has been suggested that O’Shea won this concession, which reflected well on him, by threatening Parnell with public exposure of his affair with Mrs O’Shea.

In 1886, following insinuations of the Parnell affair and O'Shea's complicity in it appearing in the Pall Mall Gazette, O'Shea abstained from voting on the First Irish Home Rule bill and resigned his parliamentary seat the following day. However, he only filed for divorce on 24 December 1889 after his wife's aunt, from whom he was expecting a large inheritance, died earlier that year leaving her estate in trust for his wife (thus allegedly violating the terms of O'Shea's marriage contract). However, that will was overturned upon appeal, and the aunt's legacy was shared among Katharine O'Shea's siblings.

After the divorce the two surviving children of Parnell and Katharine O'Shea were given into Captain O'Shea's custody.

O'Shea was MP for County Clare from 1880 to 1885 and Galway Borough for a short period in 1886. Although supported by Parnell, he was never a member of the Irish Parliamentary Party.

Parliament of the United Kingdom
| Preceded by James Patrick Mahon; Lord Francis Conyngham | Member of Parliament for County Clare; 1880–1885; With: James Patrick Mahon | Constituency abolished |
| Preceded by T. P. O'Connor | Member of Parliament for Galway Borough; 1886–1886 | Succeeded by John Pinkerton |
