= John Pinkerton (politician) =

Irish politician

John Pinkerton (1845 – 4 November 1908) was an Irish Protestant nationalist politician and Member of Parliament (MP) in the House of Commons of the United Kingdom of Great Britain and Ireland. As a member of the Irish Parliamentary Party he represented Galway Borough from 1886 to 1900.

Pinkerton was born in Ballymoney, County Antrim, the son of John Pinkerton of Seacon More. He was educated privately. He rose to local prominence as a member of the Ballymoney Debating and Agricultural Societies. He was a tenant farmer, a JP of County Antrim, and served as a member of the Coleraine Board of Guardians.

He was a leading speaker and organiser in the tenant-right campaign from 1878 to 1888. He sympathised increasingly with the Catholics of north Antrim in their support for the national Land League. Over the objections of many in the Ballymoney Agricultural Society, the Route Tenants Defence Association and Antrim Central Tenant-Right Association with which he had been associated, he endorsed the Land League as the best means to free "the white slaves of Ireland". In 1882 he invited Michael Davitt and John Ferguson to a meeting in Ballymoney. He joined them in denouncing the inadequacies of the 1881 Land Act which had abjured compulsory sale to tenants. "Landlordism", he asserted, "is doomed. ... Landlords should either sell out or buy out." Protested by Orangemen beating their drums, the meeting was followed by serious disturbances.

During the Land War he was involved with the Ballycastle and Loughguile Land League branches.

Pinkerton was an unsuccessful candidate in the 1885 general election in which he stood as an independent "representative of small farmers and labourers" for the North Antrim constituency. Despite defeat, he so impressed the Irish Parliamentary Party that he, a Protestant tenant farmer, was picked by Charles Stewart Parnell as the party candidate for Galway Borough in the 1886 general election in which he was successful.

During his 14-year career as an MP, and as a founder member of the Protestant Home Rule Association, he was active in advancing the cause of Home Rule and Land reform at Liberal demonstrations throughout Scotland and England.

In 1873, he married Isabella, daughter of Robert Pinkerton, of Ballaghmore, County Antrim. They had one son and one daughter. Another daughter died in infancy.

In 1913, their son, John Wallace Pinkerton (1878–1949), a solicitor, was an organiser in Ballymoney of a “Meeting of Protestants” at which Roger Casement, Alice Stopford Green, and Captain Jack White spoke in protest against “the illegal policy of Carsonism”—the preparation by unionists of an armed resistance to an Irish parliament.

Parliament of the United Kingdom
Preceded by William O'Shea	Member of Parliament for Galway Borough; 1886–1900	Succeeded by Michael Morris
