= 1903 Galway Borough by-election =

UK Parliamentary by-election

The 1903 Galway Borough by-election was a parliamentary by-election held for the United Kingdom House of Commons constituency of Galway Borough on 9 March 1903. The election was caused by the resignation of the sitting member, Arthur Lynch of the Irish Parliamentary Party. Lynch was adjudged guilty of high treason.

Among possible candidates mentioned were the engineer Sir Thomas Salter Pyne and Henry Murphy, a local solicitor who had been election agent for Lynch. Only one candidate was nominated, however, Charles Ramsay Devlin of the Irish Parliamentary Party, who was therefore elected unopposed.

1903 Galway Borough by-election
Party	Candidate	Votes	%	±%
Irish Parliamentary	Charles Ramsay Devlin	Unopposed		
Registered electors		2,347		
Irish Parliamentary hold				
