= Martin Joseph Blake =

Irish politician

Member of Parliament for Galway Borough
- In office 2 May 1833 – 2 April 1857 Serving with Anthony O'Flaherty (Aug. 1847–1857); James Henry Monahan (Feb. 1847–Aug. 1847); Valentine Blake (1841–Feb. 1847); Andrew Henry Lynch (1833–1841)
- Preceded by: Andrew Henry Lynch; Lachlan MacLachlan
- Succeeded by: Anthony O'Flaherty; Ulick de Burgh

Personal details
- Born: 1790
- Died: 1861 (aged 70–71)
- Party: Independent Irish Party
- Other political affiliations: Repeal Association

Martin Joseph Blake (1790 – March 1861) was an Irish Independent Irish Party and Repeal Association politician.

Blake was the son of Walter Blake and Mary Joseph. He was at some point a Deputy Lieutenant.

Blake became Repeal Association Member of Parliament (MP) for Galway Borough in 1833—following the unseating of Lachlan MacLachlan—and, elected for the Independent Irish Party in 1852, held the seat until the 1857 general election when he did not seek re-election.

Parliament of the United Kingdom
Preceded by Andrew Henry Lynch; Lachlan MacLachlan	Member of Parliament for Galway Borough; 1833–1857; With: Anthony O'Flaherty (Aug. 1847–1857); James Henry Monahan (Feb. 1847–Aug. 1847); Valentine Blake (1841–Feb. 1847); Andrew Henry Lynch (1833–1841)	Succeeded by Anthony O'Flaherty; Ulick de Burgh
