= 1901 Galway Borough by-election =

UK Parliamentary by-election

The 1901 Galway Borough by-election was a parliamentary by-election held for the United Kingdom House of Commons constituency of Galway Borough on 21 November 1901. The by-election was caused by the incumbent Martin Morris, of the Irish Unionist Alliance, being elevated to the peerage as Lord Killanin. The by-election was won by Arthur Lynch of the Irish Parliamentary Party.

1901 Galway Borough by-election
Party	Candidate	Votes	%	±%
Irish Parliamentary	Arthur Lynch	1,247	72.5	+26.1
Irish Unionist	Horace Plunkett	472	27.5	−26.1
Majority		775	45.0	N/A
Turnout		1,719	79.4	+4.9
Registered electors		2,166		
Irish Parliamentary gain from Irish Unionist		Swing	+26.1	
