= 1886 Galway Borough by-election =

UK parliamentary by-election

The 1886 Galway Borough by-election was a parliamentary by-election held for the United Kingdom House of Commons constituency of Galway Borough on 11 February 1886. The seat had been won by T. P. O'Connor of the Irish Parliamentary Party in the 1885 general election, but having been elected also in Liverpool Scotland, he chose to sit for the latter. The Galway seat thus became vacant, requiring a by-election.

== Background ==
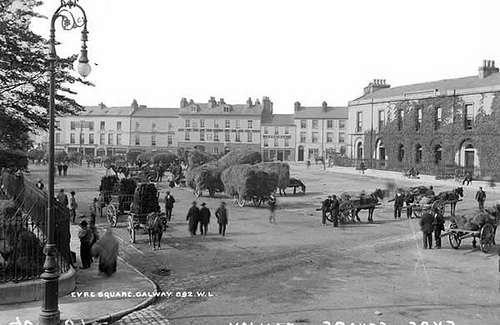
Eyre Square, Galway, late nineteenth century

It appeared at first that this would be a straightforward matter. The Times reported on 4 February that Dr O'Connor, brother of the East Donegal MP Arthur O'Connor, would stand for selection as Irish Parliamentary Party candidate, along with a Mr Doherty from Dublin. It was expected that the nominated candidate would be unopposed in the by-election.

Two days later, however, the paper announced a development. William O'Shea, formerly a Home Rule MP for County Clare, and who had narrowly been defeated in the general election as a candidate for the Liberal party in Liverpool, would stand for the Irish Parliamentary Party. O'Shea's candidacy had been proposed by the Irish Parliamentary Party leader, Charles Stewart Parnell.

Parnell's move was opposed by leading members of the party – T. P. O'Connor, Joseph Biggar and Tim Healy. Biggar and Healy went to Galway to offer their support to a local candidate, Michael Lynch. Speaking to a large crowd, Healy protested of "an attempt to foist a politician who had voted with the Whigs" on the Irish party, and complained that the party had not been consulted about the candidature. However, like his colleagues, he was aware that Parnell was in a relationship with O'Shea's wife, Katharine, who had had three children by him – a fact not publicly known and likely to cause a scandal. In an attempt to persuade O'Shea to withdraw, Healy hinted to his campaign manager that Biggar might make public reference to the affair. This failed, and on 8 February both O'Shea and Lynch were nominated.

Parnell now made clear that support for O'Shea was essential to upholding his authority as party leader and representative of the Irish people. In a telegram to his followers, he wrote: "If I be weakened now no other man in our time will ever get so near success". Insisting that the only course of action was for Lynch to withdraw, he insisted that "O'Shea has given most satisfactory pledges and he will not sit in opposition". Privately, he made clear that he believed Healy had long planned to stab him in the back.

At a meeting in the Railway Hotel, Eyre Square, Galway, Healy and Biggar made their case to a hostile group of party MPs. Healy, in an emotional speech, denied that personal hostility was behind his actions. Outside, Lynch addressed a crowd, stating that the people had made Parnell, and they could unmake him. The parliamentarians, however, swung behind Parnell after a passionate speech in which he insisted that if he were defeated, "a shout would rise from all the enemies of Ireland, 'Parnell is beaten; Ireland no longer has a leader'." Lynch was persuaded to withdraw his candidature.

By now the ballot papers had been printed and the voting had to go ahead. O'Shea received just 945 votes, compared to the 1,335 O'Connor had got just months earlier. 65 people voted for Lynch, despite his withdrawal.

== Result ==
| Election | Political result | Candidate | Party | Votes | % | ±% |
|---|---|---|---|---|---|---|
| 1886 Galway by-election Elected MP switching to another seat Turnout: 1,010 | Ind. Nationalist hold Majority: 880 (89.16%) | William O'Shea | Ind. Nationalist | 945 | 94.58 | N/A |
| 1886 Galway by-election Elected MP switching to another seat Turnout: 1,010 | Ind. Nationalist hold Majority: 880 (89.16%) | Michael Lynch | Ind. Nationalist | 65 | 5.42 | N/A |

== Consequences ==
While the imposition of O'Shea as candidate emphasised Parnell's control of his party, the by-election was to have important consequences. O'Shea abstained in the House of Commons vote on the Home Rule Bill, and did not contest the general election that followed. Parnell's opponents pointed to the rift that had opened up within the party. The Times observed that "a heavy blow had been struck at the discipline of the Home Rule Army". The unionist Galway Express said that "another such victory would cost him the leadership of the Irish party". The personal divisions within the party remained, and those who opposed Parnell over Sligo would be prominent among the supporters of the Anti-Parnellite movement when the publicity surrounding the O'Shea divorce case brought his relationship with Katharine O'Shea to public notice.
