= Michael Prendergast (MP) =

Irish politician

Michael George Prendergast (October 1764 – 18 February 1834) was an Irish soldier, merchant, and member of parliament.

A son of Miles Prendergast of County Galway, in 1786 he was commissioned as an Ensign into the East India Company's Madras Army, but resigned his commission in 1789. Becoming a private merchant in Dacca and Lucknow, he was appointed as inspector of indigo in 1807, but by 1809 was in England. He had properties in Ireland, but after his return to the British Isles he probably lived mostly in Westminster.

Prendergast was a Member of Parliament from 19 April 1809 to 2 May 1831, representing at various times the constituencies of Westbury, Gatton, Galway Borough and Saltash. In 1809, he bought a life interest in a seat at the pocket borough of Saltash, entering Parliament as a follower of Lord Wellesley, a past Governor-general of Bengal. By 1818, he was a supporter of the Liverpool ministry and unsuccessfully fought Galway, where his brother-in-law James Daly, a Tory, controlled the corporation. At the general election of 1820 he beat Valentine Blake, Daly's man, and survived an election petition. He used his seat at Saltash, where he had also been returned, to bring in another government supporter.

On 4 August 1791, at Calcutta, Prendergast married firstly Catherine Frances, a daughter of George Smith. In March 1811, he married secondly Rosetta Alicia Smyth, a daughter and coheiress of Sir Skeffington Smyth, 1st Baronet, of Tinnapark, County Wicklow. Prendergast died in 1834, while his widow survived him until 1864. Their son Wellesley Bowes Louis Henry Prendergast was born in 1817, and in 1866 he married Josephine Priscilla Polegay in Inniscarra, Cork. He died on 8 August 1868 in Listerlin, where he was not the most popular of landlords. Another son, George Maurice Prendergast, was born in 1818 in Dublin. A daughter, Rosetta Louisa was born in 1824 in Essendon, Hertfordshire, and died aged 18 in Brighton in May 1843.
