= James Henry Monahan =

Irish judge

James Henry Monahan (1803 – 8 December 1878) was one of the outstanding Irish judges of his time, and one of the first Irish Roman Catholics to achieve judicial eminence. He held office as Attorney General for Ireland and Chief Justice of the Irish Common Pleas.

== Background and education ==
Monahan was born in Portumna, County Galway, the son of Michael Monahan and his wife Mary Bloomfield, daughter of Stephen Bloomfield of Eyrecourt. He went to school in Banagher and graduated from Trinity College Dublin with a gold medal in 1823. He joined Gray's Inn in 1826, and the King's Inns in 1823.

== Professional career ==
Monahan was called to the Bar in 1828 and became a Queen's Counsel in 1840. He was appointed Solicitor-General for Ireland in 1846 and Attorney-General for Ireland in 1847, and briefly represented Galway Borough in the House of Commons. During this period he acted as principal counsel for the Crown in numerous State trials, including those of John Mitchel, Thomas Francis Meagher, Charles Gavan Duffy, and William Smith O'Brien. He was accused of packing juries, a charge he vehemently denied; a charge of anti-Catholic bias he laughed off by pointing out that he was a Catholic himself. As a lawyer, he was noted for his self-control even in times of acute crisis.

== Judge ==
In 1850, Monahan was appointed Chief Justice of the Irish Common Pleas and held that office till 1876. He was generally agreed to have been one of the best Irish judges of his time: Elrington Ball states that during his long career he had the complete confidence of the Bar and the public, and it is notable that the Fenian trials of 1865-6 did not damage his reputation as they did that of his colleague William Keogh. He had the reputation of being "a thoroughly learned lawyer" but also one who brought strong common sense to bear on a problem. Even Lord Westbury, the English Lord Chancellor, who disliked him, said patronisingly that Monahan "does know his law". Although he was impulsive and hot-tempered off the Bench, he was usually calm and controlled on it, and famed for his ability to "crush" counsel. Under stress according to one vivid description, he would "pace up and down the bench like a caged lion". He retired, due to failing health, in 1876, and died two years later.

Of the civil trials he presided over the case which probably aroused the most interest was the Yelverton case, one of several cases heard in a number of countries where Major William Charles Yelverton, hoping to make a wealthy marriage, tried to rid himself of the inconvenience of his existing marriage to Maria Theresa Longworth. In Ireland initially, he failed, as the lady's legal team convinced the jury that the marriage was valid (their verdict was reversed on appeal).

In his last years he, like most of his colleagues, was much troubled by the level of violent crime in Ireland, in particular, the number of unsolved murders, many of them apparently linked to agrarian feuds. Addressing the Grand Jury of County Meath in 1870, he referred to several recent sensational crimes in the county, none of which had been solved, and remarked that he feared the country was enduring a "reign of terror".

== Personality and family life ==
Off the bench Monahan was a somewhat alarming personality: he was fierce in manner, impulsive, and give to peppering his conversation with swearwords. Lord Westbury, while grudgingly admitting his legal ability, referred to him disparagingly as "that voluble Irish savage". His many friends, however, insisted that his fierce manner concealed a genuine warmth of character.

He married Fanny Harrington on 16 June 1832; they had two sons and six daughters, including James Henry Monahan, QC (d.1900). The marriage was a happy one and Fanny's death was a great blow to her husband; during his last years, he visited her grave at Glasnevin Cemetery each week.

== Notes ==
Parliament of the United Kingdom
Preceded by Martin Joseph Blake; Sir Valentine Blake, Bt	Member of Parliament for Galway Borough; February–August 1847; With: Martin Joseph Blake	Succeeded by Martin Joseph Blake; Anthony O'Flaherty
Political offices
Preceded by Abraham Brewster	Solicitor-General for Ireland; 1846–1847	Succeeded by John Hatchell
Preceded by Richard Moore	Attorney-General for Ireland; 1847–1850	Succeeded by John Hatchell
Preceded by John Doherty	Chief Justice of the Irish Common Pleas; 1850–1876	Succeeded by Michael Morris
