= Ulick de Burgh, Lord Dunkellin =

British politician and military officer (1827–1867)

Lieutenant-Colonel Lord Dunkellin

Member of Parliament for County Galway
- In office 1865–1867 Serving with William Henry Gregory
- Preceded by: Sir Thomas Burke, 3rd Baronet
- Succeeded by: Hubert de Burgh-Canning

Member of Parliament for Galway Borough
- In office 1857–1865 Serving with Anthony O'Flaherty; John Orrell Lever
- Preceded by: Martin Joseph Blake
- Succeeded by: Michael Morris

Personal details
- Born: Ulick Canning de Burgh; 12 July 1827 London
- Died: 16 August 1867 (aged 40) London
- Party: Whig / Liberal
- Parents: Ulick John de Burgh, 1st Marquess of Clanricarde; Hon. Harriet Canning
- Relatives: Hubert de Burgh-Canning (brother); Emily Charlotte de Burgh, Countess of Cork (sister)
- Education: Eton College
- Military career
- Allegiance: United Kingdom
- Branch: British Army
- Service years: 1846–1857
- Rank: Lieutenant-Colonel
- Commands: Coldstream Guards
- Conflicts: Crimean War; Siege of Sevastopol (1854); Anglo-Persian War

Ulick Canning de Burgh, Lord Dunkellin (English: /ˈjuːlɪk dəˈbɜːr ... dʌnˈkɛlɪn/ YOO-lik də-BUR ... dun-KEL-in; 12 July 1827 – 16 August 1867) was an Anglo-Irish soldier and politician who served during the Crimean War and was Military Secretary to the Viceroy of India and MP for Galway Borough (1857–65) and County Galway (1865–67).

A statue was erected to him in Eyre Square, Galway in 1873 in honour of his military career, and political career as MP for Galway Borough and County Galway. However, the statue was torn down after Irish independence in 1922, partly on account of his brother Hubert de Burgh-Canning who was a notoriously unpopular landlord in County Galway.

== Background ==
Dunkellin was the eldest son of Ulick de Burgh, 1st Marquess of Clanricarde, and the Hon. Harriet, daughter of George Canning. He was educated at Eton.

== Military career ==
Dunkellin entered the army in 1846 and was in the Coldstream Guards. He served as Aide-de-Camp to the Lord Lieutenant of Ireland (Lord Bessborough between 1847 and 1848 and then Lord Clarendon between 1848 and 1852) and then as State Steward to the Lord Lieutenant (Lord St Germans between 1852 and 1854). Subsequently, he served in the Crimean War and was taken prisoner during the Siege of Sevastopol in October 1854. He was appointed a Lieutenant-Colonel in 1854, and was awarded the Order of the Medjidie by Abdulmejid I, Sultan of the Ottoman Empire. In 1856, Dunkellin was Military Secretary to the Viceroy of India, his uncle Lord Canning, and also served as a volunteer on the staff during the Anglo-Persian War (1856–57). He retired from the Coldstream Guards in 1860.

== Political career ==
Dunkellin also sat as Member of Parliament for Galway Borough between 1857 and 1865 and County Galway between 1865 and 1867. Prominent as an Adullamite, he moved the amendment on the Parliamentary Reform Bill on 18 June 1866, which later led to the fall of the government of Earl Russell.

== Personal life ==
After years of ill health, Lord Dunkellin died in London in August 1867, aged 40, predeceasing his father by seven years. He never married. His younger brother Hubert later succeeded in the marquessate.

== Honours and Arms ==
=== Orders, Decorations, and Medals ===
Country	Date	Appointment	Ribbon	Post-nominals
Ottoman Empire	1854–1867	Order of the Medjidie		

=== Arms ===
Coat of arms of Ulick de Burgh, Lord Dunkellin
Crest A Cat-a-Mountain sejant guardant proper, collared and chained Or. Escutcheon Or, a cross gules in the first quarter a lion rampant sable with a label for difference. Supporters Two Cats-a-Mountain sejant guardant proper, collared and chained Or. Motto UNG ROY, UNG FOY, UNG LOY (One king, one faith, one law)

== Ancestry ==
Ancestors of Ulick de Burgh, Lord Dunkellin

8. John Smith de Burgh, 11th Earl of Clanricarde
4. John de Burgh, 13th Earl of Clanricarde
9. Hester Amelia Vincent
2. Ulick de Burgh, 1st Marquess of Clanricarde
10. Sir Thomas Burke, 1st Bt
5. Elizabeth Burke
11.
1. Ulick Canning de Burgh, Lord Dunkellin
12. George Canning
6. George Canning
13. Mary Ann Costello
3. Harriet Canning
14. Major-General John Scott
7. Joan Scott
15. Margaret Dundas

== See also ==
- House of Burgh, an Anglo-Norman and Hiberno-Norman dynasty founded in 1193

Parliament of the United Kingdom
Preceded by Martin Joseph Blake; Anthony O'Flaherty	Member of Parliament for Galway Borough; 1857–1865; With: Anthony O'Flaherty 1857; John Orrell Lever 1859–1865	Succeeded by Michael Morris; Sir Rowland Blennerhasset, Bt
Preceded by Sir Thomas Burke, Bt; William Henry Gregory	Member of Parliament for County Galway; 1865–1867; With: William Henry Gregory	Succeeded by William Henry Gregory; Viscount Burke
