= John Hatchell =

Irish lawyer and politician

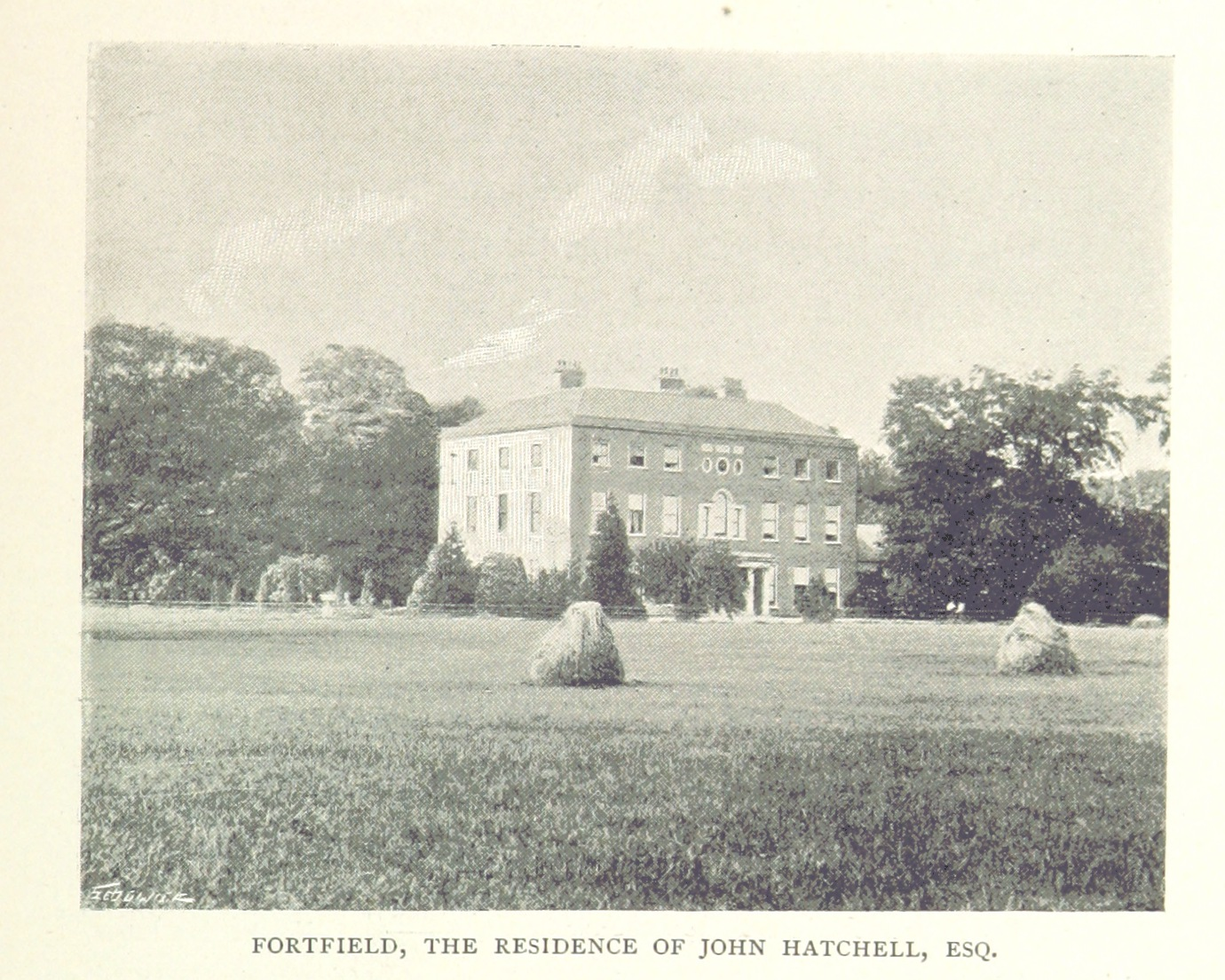
Fortfield House, Terenure

John Hatchell PC (1788–1870) was an Irish lawyer and politician.

He was born in County Wexford, Ireland, to an old established family, the son of Henry Hatchell of Wexford and Mary Lambert. He was educated at Trinity College Dublin where he took his degree of Bachelor of Arts in 1807 and Master of Arts in 1810. He lived at Fortfield House, Terenure, County Dublin, and Kingsland, Co. Wexford.

He was called to the Irish Bar in 1809 and became King's Counsel in 1833. He was appointed Solicitor-General for Ireland in 1847, and Attorney-General for Ireland in 1850, resigning in 1852. He was elected Member of Parliament (MP) for Windsor in 1850. He was a Commissioner of the Insolvent Debtors Court and a Commissioner for National Education.

As a politician he was praised for his "zealous advocacy of civil and religious liberty" and his commitment to entrenchment and economy in every department of state. Rather surprisingly, he never became a judge.

He married Elizabeth Waddy, daughter of Richard Waddy of Clougheast Castle, County Wexford, a member of a prominent local family, who were descended from Cromwellian settlers, and his wife Penelope Hatchell, daughter of Nicholas Hatchell. Elizabeth died in 1848. Cadwallader Waddy, the soldier and politician, was her brother. They had three children, John, Mary, and Penelope. Mary was the second wife of Sir Maziere Brady, Lord Chancellor of Ireland. Penelope married John Perrin, one of the many sons of the eminent High Court judge Louis Perrin; they were the parents of the well-known artist Mary Perrin. They lived with her parents at Fortfield House, which was demolished in 1934. The younger John Hatchell was MP for County Wexford.

Parliament of the United Kingdom
Preceded by Lord John Hay; George Alexander Reid	Member of Parliament for Windsor; 1850–1852; With: George Alexander Reid 1850–1852; Charles William Grenfell 1852	Succeeded by Lord Charles Wellesley; Charles William Grenfell
Legal offices
Preceded by James Henry Monahan	Solicitor-General for Ireland; 1847–1850	Succeeded by Henry George Hughes
Preceded by James Henry Monahan	Attorney-General for Ireland; 1850–1852	Succeeded by Joseph Napier
