= George Alexander Reid =

British politician

Member of Parliament for Windsor
- In office 8 November 1845 – 12 May 1852 Serving with John Hatchell (1850–1852); John Hay (1847–1850); Ralph Neville (1845–1847)
- Preceded by: Ralph Neville; John Ramsbottom
- Succeeded by: John Hatchell; Charles Grenfell

Personal details
- Born: 1794
- Died: 12 May 1852 (aged 57–58)
- Party: Conservative

George Alexander Reid (1794 – 12 May 1852) was a British Conservative politician.

== Life ==
He was the fourth son, by his first marriage, of Andrew Reid of Barnet, a Scottish brewer in London.

Reid was educated at Charterhouse School, leaving in 1810. He matriculated in 1813 at University College, Oxford, graduating B.A. in 1817, M.A. in 1822. He joined the 2nd Regiment of Life Guards in 1818 as an ensign, rising through the ranks to lieutenant-colonel in 1832. He retired on half-pay in 1845.

Reid was elected Conservative Member of Parliament for Windsor at a by-election in 1845—caused by the death of John Ramsbottom—and held the seat until his own death in 1852.

Parliament of the United Kingdom
| Preceded by Ralph Neville; John Ramsbottom | Member of Parliament for Windsor; 1845–1852; With: John Hatchell (1850–1852); John Hay (1847–1850); Ralph Neville (1845–1847) | Succeeded by John Hatchell; Charles Grenfell |
