= Lord John Hay (Royal Navy officer, born 1793) =

British naval officer and Whig politician

Rear-Admiral Lord John Hay CB DL
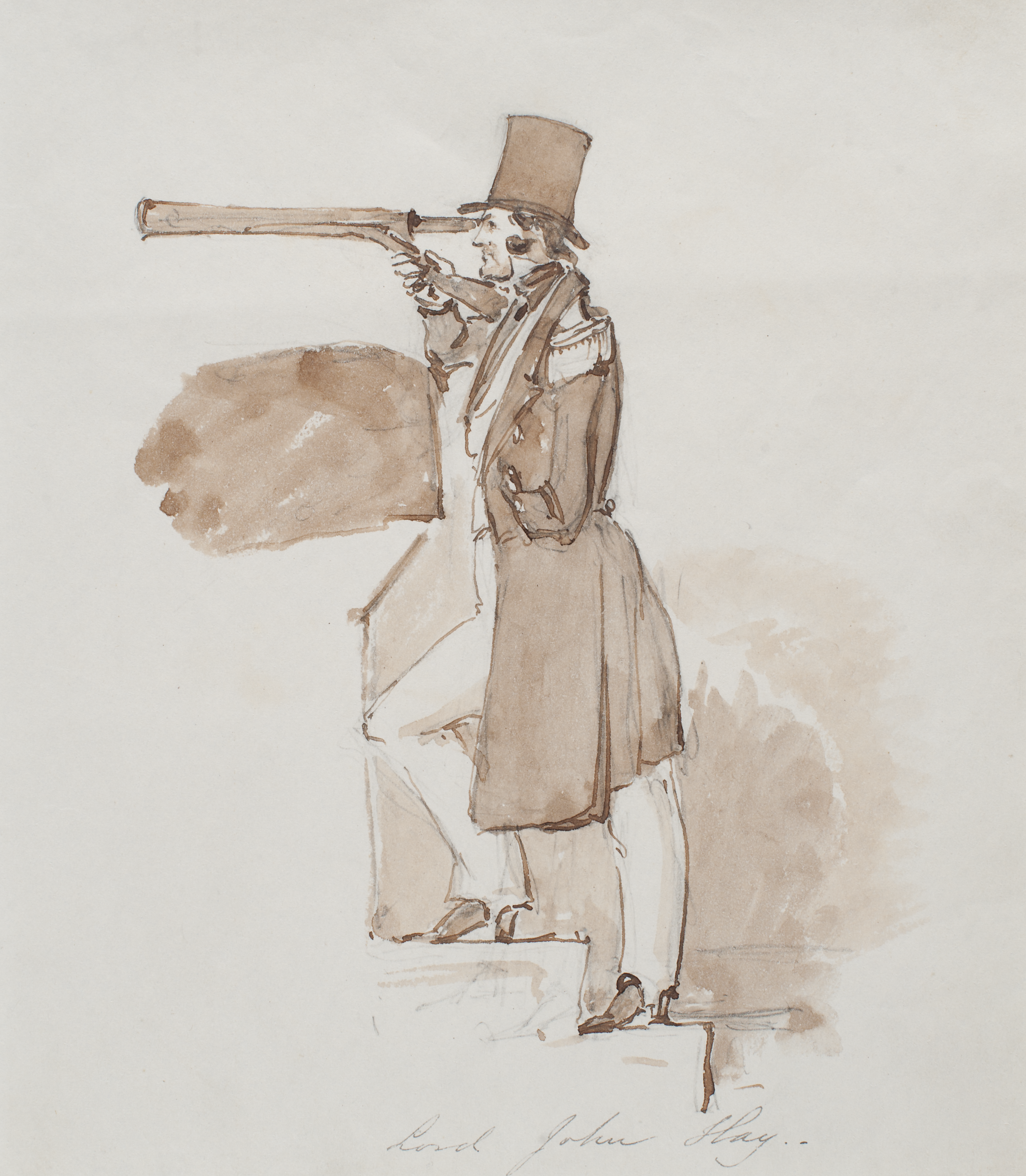
- Lord John Hay as captain of the Warspite in 1843. Watercolour by Bror Jacob Adelborg.
- Born: 1 April 1793
- Died: 9 September 1851 (aged 58)
- Military career
- Allegiance: United Kingdom
- Branch: Royal Navy
- Service years: 1806-1851
- Rank: Rear-Admiral
- Commands: HMS Castor; HMS Phoenix; HMS North Star; HMS Warspite
- Awards: Companion of the Order of the Bath

Rear-Admiral Lord John Hay CB DL (1 April 1793 – 9 September 1851) was a British naval officer and Whig politician.

== Naval career ==
The third son of George Hay, 7th Marquess of Tweeddale, Hay entered the Navy in December 1804, appearing on the books of HMS Monarch. However, this was probably a nominal enrollment to increase his seniority. Hay's first real service was probably aboard HMS Seahorse, beginning in December 1806. He saw considerable action aboard Seahorse (42) on the Mediterranean station, under Captain John Stewart, losing his left arm on a cutting-out expedition in Hyères Bay in 1807. Hay was present during the Seahorse's epic fight, on 5 July 1808, with the Badere Zaffer (52) and Alis Fezan (24), which ended with the capture of the Badere Zaffer and the sinking of the Alis Fezan.

He was promoted lieutenant on 1 May 1812, and was appointed to HMS Pique, going to the West Indies station, on 1 June. He transferred to HMS Venerable on 31 May 1814 and was promoted commander on 15 June. On 15 November, Hay joined HMS Bustard, off Lisbon, and was given command of the sloop HMS Opossum in 1815. Opossum served in the Channel and on the North American station until paid off on 5 August 1818. He was made a post-captain on 7 December. On 23 July 1823, he was appointed a deputy lieutenant of East Lothian.

In 1826, he was returned as Member of Parliament for Haddingtonshire. However, due to his Whig connections, he was unable to obtain another command until 24 December 1832, when he was given the new frigate HMS Castor. In 1833, he received a medal from the Society for the Encouragement of the Arts for inventing a telescope-holder that could be used by a one-handed man. On 19 November 1836, he was transferred to the paddle sloop HMS Phoenix, and on 8 March 1837 to HMS North Star, which he commanded until 1840.

During much of this time, Hay acted as commodore of a squadron off the northern coast of Spain, with a naval brigade providing support for the Spanish government during the First Carlist War. For his actions during the war, particularly in helping to defend Bilbao, he was made a Companion of the Bath and received the Grand Cross of the Order of Charles III. After the war, Hay commanded HMS Warspite on the North American and West Indies station from 17 August 1841 to October 1845. It was Warspite which, in 1842, carried Lord Ashburton to America to negotiate the Webster-Ashburton Treaty. After briefly serving as superintendent of Woolwich Dockyard, Hay was returned as Member of Parliament for Windsor in 1847. He was also appointed Fourth Naval Lord in 1846 and Third Naval Lord in 1847.

Hay chaired the "Committee of Reference" that resulted in the retirement of Sir William Symonds as Surveyor of the Navy. However, Hay's own attempts at directing steam warship design, despite his interest in the subject, proved unsuccessful. The committee was disbanded, design placed in the hands of Symonds' successor, Sir Baldwin Walker, and Hay removed from the Board and made superintendent of Devonport Dockyard on 9 February 1850. Hay also resigned from Parliament by becoming Steward of the Manor of Northstead at this time. He was promoted rear admiral on 7 September 1851, hoisting his flag aboard HMS St George, but died two days later.

== Family ==
In 1846, Hay married Mary Anne Cameron (died 30 November 1850), daughter of Donald Cameron, 22nd Lochiel: they had no children.

== See also ==
- O'Byrne, William Richard (1849). "Hay, John (a)" . A Naval Biographical Dictionary . John Murray – via Wikisource.

Parliament of the United Kingdom
Preceded by Sir James Suttie, Bt	Member of Parliament for Haddingtonshire; 1826–1830	Succeeded by James Balfour
Preceded by Ralph Neville; George Alexander Reid	Member of Parliament for Windsor; 1847–1850; With: George Alexander Reid	Succeeded by George Alexander Reid; John Hatchell
Military offices
Preceded by Sir Henry Rous	Fourth Naval Lord; 1846–1847	Succeeded by Sir Alexander Milne
Preceded by Sir Maurice Berkeley	Third Naval Lord; 1847–1850	Succeeded by Sir Houston Stewart
