= Galway Borough =

UK parliamentary constituency in Ireland, 1801–1918

- Former borough constituency for the House of Commons
- County: County Galway
- Borough: Galway

1801–1918
- Seats: 1 (1801–1832); 2 (1832–1885); 1 (1885–1918)
- Created from: Galway Town (IHC)
- Replaced by: Galway Connemara

Galway Borough was a United Kingdom Parliament constituency in Ireland. It returned one MP from 1801 to 1832, two MPs from 1832 to 1885 and one MP from 1885 to 1918. It was an original constituency represented in Parliament when the Union of Great Britain and Ireland took effect on 1 January 1801.

== History and boundaries ==
This constituency was the parliamentary borough of Galway in County Galway. The boundary commissioners indicated in their report of January 1832 that as the elective franchise extended to the whole of the liberties, they were not authorised to propose any narrower limit than the boundary of the county of the city. It was defined by the Parliamentary Boundaries (Ireland) Act 1832 as: "The County of the Town of Galway".

It received a second MP under the Representation of the People (Ireland) Act 1832. It was reduced to one MP again under the Redistribution of Seats Act 1885.

The 1917 Boundary Commission had recommended the abolition of the constituency, to become part of Galway Connemara. This was implemented under the Redistribution of Seats (Ireland) Act 1918

== Members of Parliament ==
Year	Member	Party
1801	St. George Daly	
1801	John Ponsonby	
1802	Denis Bowes Daly	
1805	James Daly	
1811	Frederick Ponsonby	Whig
1813	Valentine Blake	Tory
1820	Michael Prendergast	Tory
1826	James O'Hara	Non Partisan
1831	John Bodkin	Whig

- Representation increased to two seats (1832)

Year	First member	First party	Second member	Second party
1832	Andrew Henry Lynch	Repeal Association	Lachlan MacLachlan	Repeal Association
1833	Andrew Henry Lynch	Repeal Association	Martin Joseph Blake	Repeal Association
1841	Sir Valentine Blake, Bt	Repeal Association	Martin Joseph Blake	Repeal Association
Feb. 1847	James Henry Monahan	Whig	Martin Joseph Blake	Repeal Association
Aug. 1847	Anthony O'Flaherty	Repeal Association	Martin Joseph Blake	Repeal Association
1852	Anthony O'Flaherty	Ind. Irish	Martin Joseph Blake	Ind. Irish
Apr. 1857	Anthony O'Flaherty	Whig	Ulick de Burgh	Whig
Jul. 1857	Vacant		Ulick de Burgh	Whig
Feb. 1859	John Orrell Lever	Conservative	Ulick de Burgh	Whig
May. 1859	John Orrell Lever	Conservative	Ulick de Burgh	Liberal
1865	Sir Rowland Blennerhassett, Bt	Liberal	Michael Morris	Liberal
1866	Sir Rowland Blennerhassett, Bt	Liberal	Michael Morris	Conservative
1867	Sir Rowland Blennerhassett, Bt	Liberal	George Morris	Liberal
1868	Sir Rowland Blennerhassett, Bt	Liberal	William St Lawrence	Liberal
Feb. 1874	George Morris	Home Rule League	William St Lawrence	Home Rule League
Mar. 1874	George Morris	Home Rule League	Frank Hugh O'Donnell	Home Rule League
Jun. 1874	George Morris	Home Rule League	Michael Francis Ward	Home Rule League
1880	T. P. O'Connor	Parnellite Home Rule League	John Orrell Lever	Home Rule League

- Representation reduced to one seat (1885)

Election	Member	Party
1885	T. P. O'Connor	Irish Parliamentary Party
1886	William O'Shea	Independent Nationalist
1886	John Pinkerton	Irish Parliamentary Party
1890^{1}	John Pinkerton	Irish National Federation (Anti-Parnellite)
1900	Martin Morris	Irish Unionist Party
1901	Arthur Lynch	Irish Parliamentary Party
1903	Charles Ramsay Devlin	Irish Parliamentary Party
1906	Stephen Gwynn	Irish Parliamentary Party
1918	Constituency abolished	

^{1}There was no election but the IPP split into two factions, and Pinkerton joined the faction opposing Parnell.

== Elections ==
=== Elections in the 1830s ===
General election 1830: Galway Borough
Party	Candidate	Votes	%	±%
Nonpartisan	James O'Hara (Irish politician)	381	55.5	
Repeal	Valentine Blake	305	44.5	
Majority		76	11.0	
Turnout		686	c. 33.4	
Registered electors		c. 2,052		
Nonpartisan hold		Swing		

General election 1831: Galway Borough
Party	Candidate	Votes	%
Whig	John James Bodkin	Unopposed	
Registered electors		2,052	
Whig gain from Nonpartisan			

General election 1832: Galway Borough (2 seats)
Party	Candidate	Votes	%
Repeal	Andrew Henry Lynch	1,265	41.8
Repeal	Lachlan MacLachlan	951	31.5
Repeal	Martin Joseph Blake	807	26.7
Majority		144	4.8
Turnout		1,795	87.1
Registered electors		2,062	
Repeal gain from Whig			
Repeal win (new seat)			

- On petition, MacLachlan was unseated in favour of Blake

General election 1835: Galway Borough (2 seats)
Party	Candidate	Votes	%
Repeal (Whig)	Andrew Henry Lynch	Unopposed	
Repeal (Whig)	Martin Joseph Blake	Unopposed	
Registered electors		2,062	
Repeal hold			
Repeal hold			

General election 1837: Galway Borough (2 seats)
Party	Candidate	Votes	%
Repeal (Whig)	Andrew Henry Lynch	565	42.5
Repeal (Whig)	Martin Joseph Blake	462	34.7
Conservative	Denis Daly	296	22.3
Conservative	Robert Burke	7	0.5
Majority		166	12.4
Turnout		772	28.2
Registered electors		2,739	
Repeal hold			
Repeal hold			

Lynch was appointed as a Master in Chancery, requiring a by-election.

By-election, 12 February 1838: Galway Borough
Party	Candidate	Votes	%	±%
Repeal (Whig)	Andrew Henry Lynch	445	73.7	+31.2
Repeal	Valentine Blake	159	26.3	N/A
Majority		286	47.4	+35.0
Turnout		604	c. 22.1	c. −6.1
Registered electors		c. 2,739		
Repeal hold		Swing	+31.2	

=== Elections in the 1840s ===
General election 1841: Galway Borough (2 seats)
Party	Candidate	Votes	%	±%
Repeal	Valentine Blake	Unopposed		
Repeal	Martin Joseph Blake	Unopposed		
Registered electors		1,600		
Repeal hold				
Repeal hold				

Valentine Blake's death caused a by-election.

By-election, 17 February 1847: Galway Borough
Party	Candidate	Votes	%	±%
Whig	James Henry Monahan	510	50.2	New
Repeal	Anthony O'Flaherty	506	49.8	N/A
Majority		4	0.4	N/A
Turnout		1,016	74.2	N/A
Registered electors		1,369		
Whig gain from Repeal		Swing	N/A	

General election 1847: Galway Borough (2 seats)
Party	Candidate	Votes	%	±%
Repeal	Anthony O'Flaherty	Unopposed		
Repeal	Martin Joseph Blake	Unopposed		
Registered electors		1,369		
Repeal hold				
Repeal hold				

=== Elections in the 1850s ===
General election 1852: Galway Borough (2 seats)
Party	Candidate	Votes	%	±%
Independent Irish	Anthony O'Flaherty	632	48.1	N/A
Independent Irish	Martin Joseph Blake	411	31.3	N/A
Whig	Ulick de Burgh	272	20.7	New
Majority		139	10.6	N/A
Turnout		658 (est)	63.4 (est)	N/A
Registered electors		1,038		
Independent Irish gain from Repeal		Swing	N/A	
Independent Irish gain from Repeal		Swing	N/A	

General election 1857: Galway Borough (2 seats)
Party	Candidate	Votes	%	±%
Whig	Ulick de Burgh	646	40.7	+20.0
Whig	Anthony O'Flaherty	508	32.0	−16.1
Independent Irish	Theodore Patrick French	433	27.3	−4.0
Majority		75	4.7	N/A
Turnout		794 (est)	67.2 (est)	+3.8
Registered electors		1,115		
Whig gain from Independent Irish		Swing	+11.0	
Whig gain from Independent Irish		Swing	−3.0	

In July 1857, on petition, O'Flaherty was unseated—as he was guilty, by his agents, of bribery—and a new writ was then issued in February 1859.

By-election, 11 February 1859: Galway Borough
Party	Candidate	Votes	%	±%
Conservative	John Orrell Lever	Unopposed		
Registered electors		1,300		
Conservative gain from Whig				

General election 1859: Galway Borough (2 seats)
Party	Candidate	Votes	%	±%
Conservative	John Orrell Lever	743	39.2	N/A
Liberal	Ulick de Burgh	603	31.8	−8.9
Liberal	Theodore Patrick French	548	28.9	+1.6
Majority		195	10.3	N/A
Turnout		947 (est)	72.8 (est)	+5.6
Registered electors		1,300		
Conservative gain from Liberal		Swing		
Liberal hold		Swing		

=== Elections in the 1860s ===
General election 1865: Galway Borough (2 seats)
Party	Candidate	Votes	%	±%
Liberal	Michael Morris	883	47.3	+15.5
Liberal	Rowland Blennerhassett	672	36.0	+7.1
Conservative	John Orrell Lever	291	15.6	−23.6
Independent Liberal	Nicholas Stubber	22	1.2	New
Majority		381	20.3	N/A
Turnout		1,080 (est)	91.4 (est)	+18.6
Registered electors		1,182		
Liberal hold		Swing	+13.7	
Liberal gain from Conservative		Swing	+9.5	

Morris was appointed Solicitor-General for Ireland, requiring a by-election.

1866 Galway Borough by-election (1 seat)
Party	Candidate	Votes	%	±%
Conservative	Michael Morris	756	81.5	+65.9
Independent Liberal	Nicholas Stubber	172	18.5	+17.3
Majority		584	63.0	N/A
Turnout		928	78.6	−12.8
Registered electors		1,180		
Conservative gain from Liberal		Swing	−9.6	

Morris was appointed Attorney-General for Ireland, requiring a by-election.

February 1867 Galway Borough by-election (1 seat)
Party	Candidate	Votes	%	±%
Conservative	Michael Morris	Unopposed		
Conservative hold				

Morris resigned after being appointed a judge of the Court of Common Pleas.

April 1867 Galway Borough by-election (1 seat)
Party	Candidate	Votes	%	±%
Liberal	George Morris	Unopposed		
Liberal gain from Conservative				

General election 1868: Galway Borough (2 seats)
Party	Candidate	Votes	%	±%
Liberal	William St Lawrence	826	36.3	−11.0
Liberal	Rowland Blennerhassett	804	35.3	−0.7
Liberal	Martin Francis O'Flaherty	432	19.0	N/A
Conservative	James O'Hare	213	9.4	−6.2
Majority		372	16.3	−4.0
Turnout		1,244 (est)	90.1 (est)	−1.3
Registered electors		1,381		
Liberal hold		Swing	−4.0	
Liberal hold		Swing	+1.2	

=== Elections in the 1870s ===
General election 1874: Galway Borough (2 seats)
Party	Candidate	Votes	%	±%
Home Rule	George Morris	761	42.9	New
Home Rule	William St Lawrence	604	34.0	−2.3
Home Rule	Frank Hugh O'Donnell	409	23.1	New
Majority		195	10.9	N/A
Turnout		887 (est)	61.4 (est)	−28.7
Registered electors		1,444		
Home Rule gain from Liberal		Swing	N/A	
Home Rule gain from Liberal		Swing	N/A	

St Lawrence succeeded to the peerage, becoming Earl of Howth.

March 1874 Galway Borough by-election (1 seat)
Party	Candidate	Votes	%	±%
Home Rule	Frank Hugh O'Donnell	579	61.8	N/A
Liberal	Pierce Joyce	358	38.2	New
Majority		221	23.6	+12.7
Turnout		937	64.9	+3.5
Registered electors		1,444		
Home Rule hold		Swing	N/A	

On petition, O'Donnell was unseated.

June 1874 Galway Borough by-election (1 seat)
Party	Candidate	Votes	%	±%
Home Rule	Michael Francis Ward	726	71.6	N/A
Liberal	James Henry Monahan	288	28.4	N/A
Majority		438	43.2	+32.3
Turnout		1,014	70.2	+8.8
Registered electors		1,444		
Home Rule hold		Swing	N/A	

=== Elections in the 1880s ===
General election 1880: Galway Borough (2 seats)
Party	Candidate	Votes	%	±%
Home Rule	John Orrell Lever	501	34.1	N/A
Parnellite Home Rule League	T. P. O'Connor	487	33.2	N/A
Home Rule	Hugh Tarpey	481	32.7	N/A
Majority		6	0.5	−10.4
Turnout		988 (est)	78.4 (est)	+17.0
Registered electors		1,261		
Home Rule hold		Swing	N/A	
Home Rule hold		Swing	N/A	

1885 general election: Galway Borough
Party	Candidate	Votes	%	±%
Irish Parliamentary	T. P. O'Connor	1,335	89.1	N/A
Irish Loyal and Patriotic Union	Thomas George Palmer Hallett	164	10.9	New
Majority		1,171	78.2	N/A
Turnout		1,499	66.2	−12.2 (est)
Registered electors		2,265		
Irish Parliamentary hold		Swing	N/A	

O'Connor is also elected for Liverpool Scotland and opts to sit there, prompting a by-election.

1886 Galway Borough by-election
Party	Candidate	Votes	%	±%
Ind. Nationalist	William O'Shea	942	94.6	N/A
Ind. Nationalist	Michael Aloysius Lynch	54	5.4	N/A
Majority		888	89.2	+11.0
Turnout		996	66.2	0.0
Registered electors		2,265		
Ind. Nationalist gain from Irish Parliamentary		Swing	N/A	

1886 general election: Galway Borough
Party	Candidate	Votes	%	±%
Irish Parliamentary	John Pinkerton	Unopposed		
Registered electors		2,265		
Irish Parliamentary gain from Ind. Nationalist				

=== Elections in the 1890s ===
1892 general election: Galway Borough
Party	Candidate	Votes	%	±%
Irish National Federation	John Pinkerton	644	52.1	N/A
Irish National League	Arthur Lynch	593	47.9	N/A
Majority		51	4.2	N/A
Turnout		1,237	64.8	N/A
Registered electors		1,909		
Irish National Federation gain from Irish Parliamentary		Swing	N/A	

1895 general election: Galway Borough
Party	Candidate	Votes	%	±%
Irish National Federation	John Pinkerton	596	40.9	−11.2
Irish National League	Edmund Leamy	465	31.9	−16.0
Irish Unionist	Martin Morris	395	27.1	New
Majority		131	9.0	+4.8
Turnout		1,456	82.8	+18.0
Registered electors		1,759		
Irish National Federation hold		Swing	+2.4	

=== Elections in the 1900s ===
1900 general election: Galway Borough
Party	Candidate	Votes	%	±%
Irish Unionist	Martin Morris	882	53.6	+26.5
Irish Parliamentary	Edmund Leamy	763	46.4	−26.4'"`UNIQ−−ref−000000C4−QINU`"'
Majority		119	7.2	N/A
Turnout		1,645	74.5	−8.3
Registered electors		2,209		
Irish Unionist gain from Irish Parliamentary		Swing	+26.5	

Morris is elevated to the peerage as Lord Killanin, prompting a by-election.

1901 Galway Borough by-election
Party	Candidate	Votes	%	±%
Irish Parliamentary	Arthur Lynch	1,247	72.5	+26.1
Irish Unionist	Horace Plunkett	472	27.5	−26.1
Majority		775	45.0	N/A
Turnout		1,719	79.4	+4.9
Registered electors		2,166		
Irish Parliamentary gain from Irish Unionist		Swing	+26.1	

Lynch is adjudged guilty of high treason, prompting a by-election.

1903 Galway Borough by-election
Party	Candidate	Votes	%	±%
Irish Parliamentary	Charles Ramsay Devlin	Unopposed		
Registered electors		2,347		
Irish Parliamentary hold				

1906 general election: Galway Borough
Party	Candidate	Votes	%	±%
Irish Parliamentary	Charles Ramsay Devlin	Unopposed		
Registered electors		2,202		
Irish Parliamentary hold				

Devlin resigns, causing a by-election.

1906 Galway Borough by-election
Party	Candidate	Votes	%	±%
Irish Parliamentary	Stephen Gwynn	983	63.7	N/A
Ind. Nationalist	John Shawe-Taylor	559	36.3	New
Majority		424	27.4	N/A
Turnout		1,542	70.0	N/A
Registered electors		2,202		
Irish Parliamentary hold		Swing	N/A	

=== Elections in the 1910s ===
January 1910 general election: Galway Borough
Party	Candidate	Votes	%	±%
Irish Parliamentary	Stephen Gwynn	Unopposed		
Registered electors		2,306		
Irish Parliamentary hold				

December 1910 general election: Galway Borough
Party	Candidate	Votes	%	±%
Irish Parliamentary	Stephen Gwynn	1,062	84.0	N/A
Ind. Unionist	James Leslie Wanklyn	203	16.0	New
Majority		859	68.0	N/A
Turnout		1,265	54.9	N/A
Registered electors		2,306		
Irish Parliamentary hold				
