= Lachlan MacLachlan =

Lachlan MacLachlan (9 May 1791 – 30 April 1849) was a Scottish-born barrister and, briefly, a Repeal Association MP.

MacLachlan, the son of Robert MacLachlan and Mary Campbell, was born in Strathlachlan.

MacLachlan became Repeal Association Member of Parliament (MP) for Galway Borough in 1832 but was unseated on petition on 30 April 1833.

He was awarded the compensation for the enslaved people on Pembroke estate in Tobago, as he was, alongside Andrew Henry Lynch and James Campbell, an assignee of a mortgage, probably as executors and beneficiaries of the will of his uncle Lt General James Campbell (1743–1820).

MacLachlan died in Galway in 1849.
