= Andrew Henry Lynch =

Irish barrister and politician

Andrew Henry Lynch (1792 – 13 July 1847) was an Irish barrister and a Repeal Association MP.

He was the only son of Patrick Lynch and Jane Kelly of Strokestown. He owned the townlands of Lydacan and Lisswulla in Claregalway.

In 1810, he graduated from Trinity College Dublin with a BA. He was called to the English Bar at the Middle Temple on 21 January 1818.

Blake became Repeal Association Member of Parliament (MP) for Galway Borough in 1833, alongside Lachlan MacLachlan, and held the seat until the 1841 general election, when he did not seek re-election. He received £1,940 in compensation for 85 slaves on the Pembroke, Tobago estate during the abolition of slavery. In 1838, he was appointed a Master in Chancery in England.

He married Theresa Butler (d. 1863), daughter of Charles Butler.

He died at Tournai on 13 July 1847.
