= Anthony O'Flaherty =

Politician, died 1866

Member of Parliament for Galway Borough
- In office 2 August 1847 – 13 July 1857 Serving with Ulick de Burgh (Apr. 1857–Jul. 1857); Martin Joseph Blake (1847–Apr. 1857)
- Preceded by: James Henry Monahan; Martin Joseph Blake
- Succeeded by: Ulick de Burgh; John Orrell Lever

Personal details
- Born: 1800
- Died: 1866 (aged 65–66)
- Party: Whig
- Other political affiliations: Independent Irish Party; Repeal Association

Anthony O'Flaherty (1800–1866) was an Irish Whig, Independent Irish Party and Repeal Association politician.

O'Flaherty was first elected Repeal Association Member of Parliament (MP) for Galway Borough at the 1847 general election and—elected for the Independent Irish Party in 1852, and the Whigs in April 1857—held the seat until July 1857 when he was unseated due to bribery by his agents.

Parliament of the United Kingdom
Preceded by James Henry Monahan; Martin Joseph Blake	Member of Parliament for Galway Borough; 1847–1857; With: Ulick de Burgh (Apr. 1857–Jul. 1857); Martin Joseph Blake (1847–Apr. 1857)	Succeeded by Ulick de Burgh; John Orrell Lever
