= Baron Killanin =

Title in the Peerage of the United Kingdom

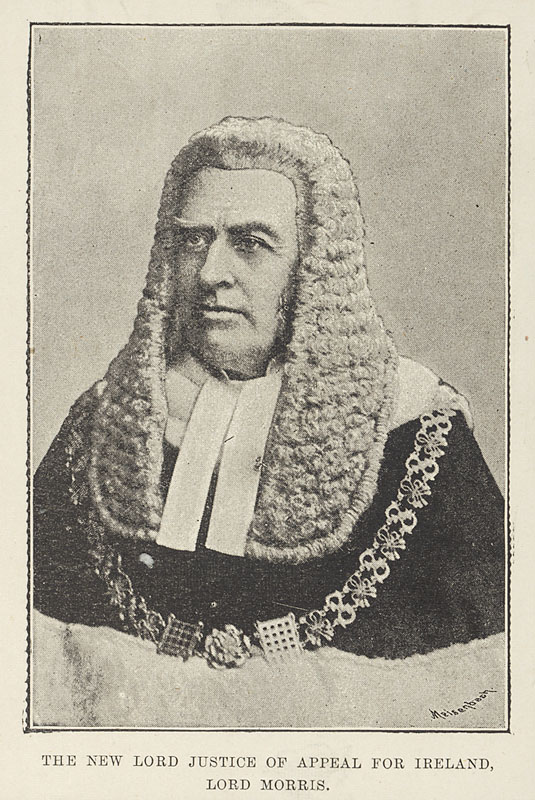
Michael Morris, 1st Baron Killanin

Baron Killanin, of Galway in County Galway, is a title in the Peerage of the United Kingdom.

== History ==
It was created in 1900 for the Irish lawyer and politician Michael Morris, Baron Morris, Lord Chief Justice of Ireland from 1887 to 1889 and a Lord of Appeal in Ordinary from 1889 to 1900. He had already been created a Baronet in the Baronetage of the United Kingdom in 1885, and a life peer under the Appellate Jurisdiction Act 1876 as Baron Morris, of Spiddal in County Galway, in 1889. On his death in 1901 the life peerage became extinct while he was succeeded in the baronetcy and hereditary barony by his eldest son, the second Baron. He briefly represented Galway Borough in the House of Commons as a Conservative and also served as Lord Lieutenant of County Galway from 1918 to 1922. He was succeeded by his nephew, the third Baron, the son of George Henry Morris. He was a prominent author, journalist and sports official and served as President of the International Olympic Committee from between 1972 and 1980. As of 2017 the titles are held by his eldest son, the fourth Baron, who succeeded in 1999. He is a film producer.

The traditional burial place of the Barons Killanin is the Morris family vault in Bohermore Cemetery, Galway.

== Morris baronets, of Spiddal (1885) ==
- Sir Michael Morris, 1st Baronet (1826–1901) (created a life peer as Baron Morris in 1889)

== Baron Morris (1889) ==
- Michael Morris, Baron Morris (1826–1901) (created Baron Killanin in 1900)

The title became extinct in 1901

== Barons Killanin (1900) ==
- Michael Morris, 1st Baron Killanin (1826–1901)
- Martin Henry Fitzpatrick Morris, 2nd Baron Killanin (1867–1927)
- Michael Morris, 3rd Baron Killanin (1914–1999)
- (George) Redmond (Fitzpatrick) Morris, 4th Baron Killanin (b. 1947)

The heir apparent is the present holder's son the Hon. Luke Michael Geoffrey Morris (b. 1975)

=== Line of Succession ===
- Michael Morris, Baron Morris, 1st Baron Killanin (1826—1901)
  - Martin Henry FitzPatrick Morris, 2nd Baron Killanin (1867–1927)
  - Lt.-Col. Hon. George Henry Morris (1872–1914)
    - Michael Morris, 3rd Baron Killanin (1914–1999)
      - George Redmond FitzPatrick Morris, 4th Baron Killanin (born 1947)
        - (1) Hon. Luke Michael Geoffrey Morris (b. 1975)
      - (2) Hon. Michael Francis Leo Morris (b. 1951)
        - (3) James Michael Morris (b. 1983)
      - (4) Hon. John Martin Morris (b. 1951)
        - (5) Roderic Michael Morris (b. 1976)
        - (6) Michael-John Morris (b. 1979)

== Arms ==
Coat of arms of Baron Killanin
Crest On a fasces Proper a lion’s head erased Argent gutté de sang. Escutcheon Ermine a fess indented Sable in base a lion rampant of the last armed and langued Gules. Motto Si Deus Nobiscum Quis Contra Nos

== Notes ==
Baronetage of the United Kingdom
Preceded by Corry baronets	Morris baronets of Spiddal; 14 September 1885	Succeeded by Alexander baronets
