= Guards' Grave =

WWI military cemetery located in Departement de l'Aisne, Picardie, France

Coordinates: 49.2820°N 3.1112°E

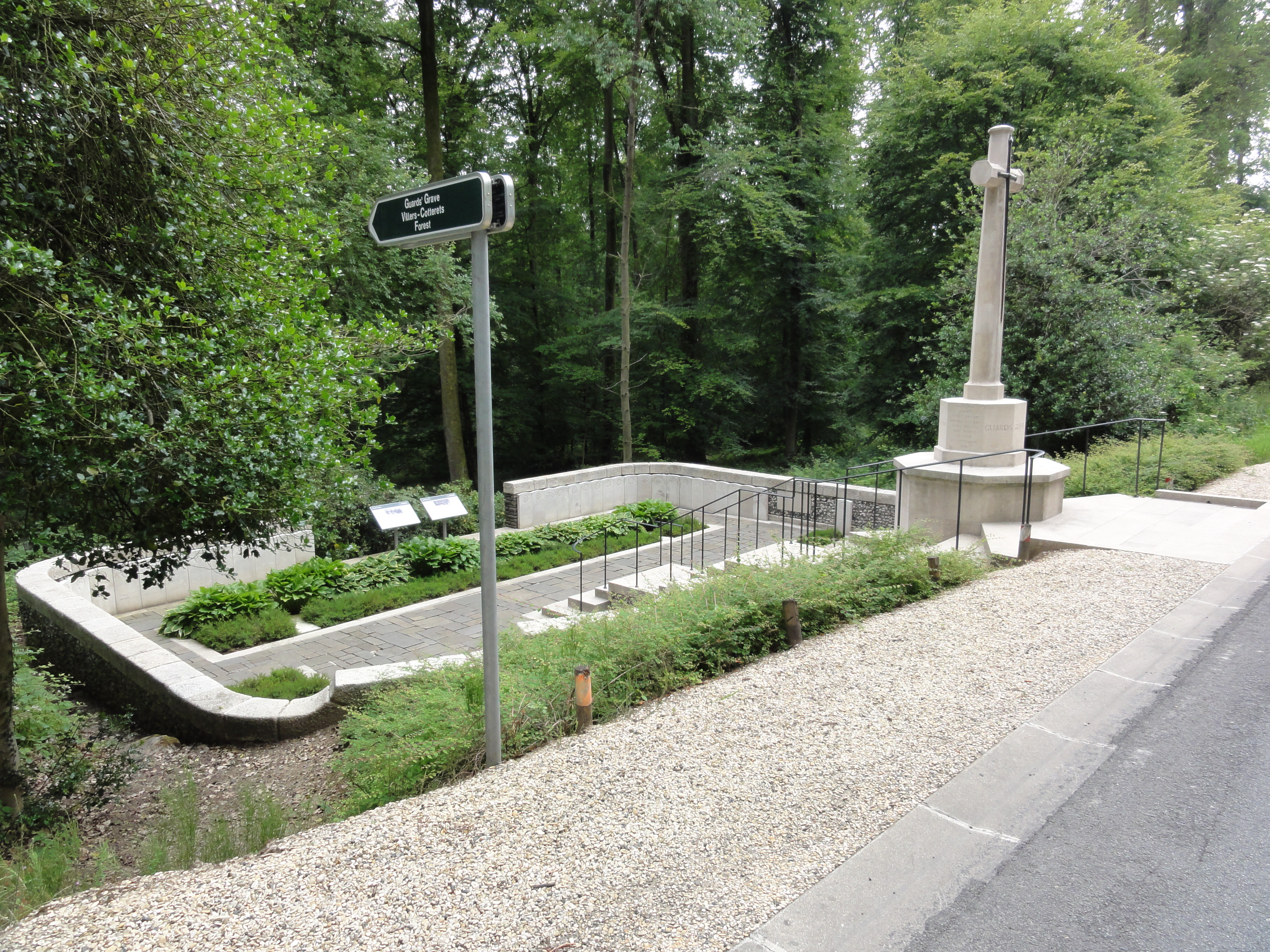

Guards' Grave is a military cemetery near Villers-Cotterêts in northern France, maintained by the Commonwealth War Graves Commission.

In 1914, the British Expeditionary Force fought a rearguard action here during the Retreat from Mons. On 1 September, the British 4th (Guards) Brigade who were covering the withdrawal of 2nd Division, came into contact with the leading units of the German III Corps on the edge of woodland near Villers-Cotterêts. The brigade lost more than 300 men in the encounter, but were able to break away and continue the withdrawal.

The cemetery in its original form was created by Lord Killanin (the brother of Lieut-Col. George Henry Morris, who had been killed in the action on 1 September) along with Lord Robert Cecil M.P. who was working for the Missing and Wounded Department of the Red Cross (and whose nephew Lieut. George Cecil is also buried here) the Lord Elphinstone, and the Revd. H. T. R. Briggs who had together discovered a makeshift grave when they visited in November 1914. It is thought that had been made by wounded British prisoners of war, with the help of local people. The group decided to have the bodies disinterred with the help of the town's doctor, Dr. Henri Moufflier, in an attempt to identify as many as they could, and after three days they found 98 men in total, though they were unable to identify 20 of them. They enlarged what they referred to as the 'pit' and reburied the men. This layout can still clearly be seen today, with the later headstones arranged around the edge. Originally the four officers were buried in a plot in the Villers-Cotterêts town cemetery, but after the war when the Commonwealth War Graves Commission carried out a reconciliation they were put back with the others in the Guards' Grave.

Guards' Grave was designed by Sir Herbert Baker. Rudyard Kipling, who wrote the Irish Guards regimental biography of the First World War said it was "perhaps the most beautiful of all resting-places in France".
