= Michael Morris, 3rd Baron Killanin =

President of the IOC from 1972 to 1980

His Excellency The Right Honourable The Lord Killanin MBE TD
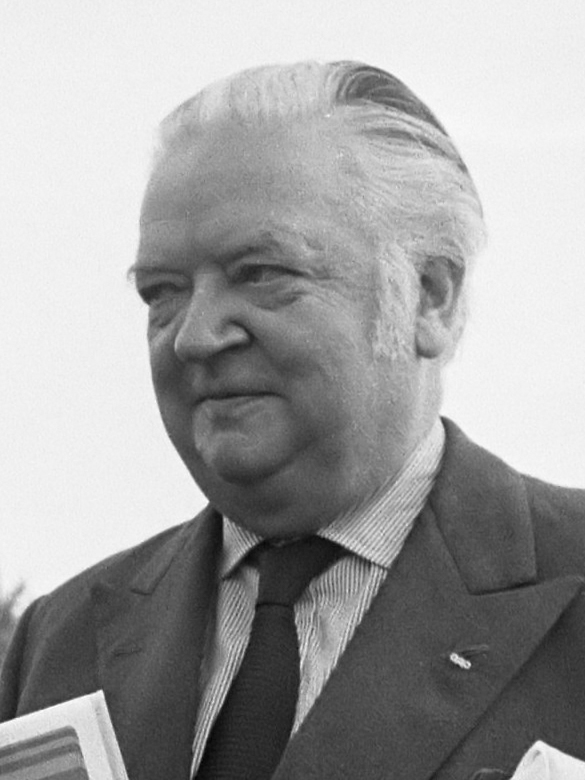
- Morris in 1976

Member of the House of Lords; Lord Temporal
- In office 11 August 1927 – 25 April 1999; Hereditary peerage
- Preceded by: The 2nd Baron Killanin
- Succeeded by: The 4th Baron Killanin

6th President of the International Olympic Committee
- In office 11 September 1972 – 3 August 1980
- Preceded by: Avery Brundage
- Succeeded by: Juan Antonio Samaranch

Honorary President of the International Olympic Committee
- In office 3 August 1980 – 25 April 1999
- Preceded by: Vacant, last held by Avery Brundage (1975)
- Succeeded by: Vacant, next held by Juan Antonio Samaranch (2001)

Personal details
- Born: 30 July 1914 London, England
- Died: 25 April 1999 (aged 84) Dublin, Ireland
- Spouse: Sheila Dunlop (m. 1945)
- Children: 4, including Redmond and Mouse
- Education: Magdalene College, Cambridge
- Occupation: Journalist, film producer, author, business executive, honorary consul

Michael Morris, 3rd Baron Killanin (30 July 1914 – 25 April 1999) was an Irish journalist, author, sports official, and the sixth president of the International Olympic Committee (IOC), serving from 1972 to 1980. He succeeded his uncle as Baron Killanin in the Peerage of the United Kingdom in 1927, when he was 12, which allowed him to sit in the House of Lords at the Palace of Westminster as Lord Killanin upon turning 21.

== Early life ==
Morris was born in London, the son of Lt. Col. George Morris, an Irish Catholic from Spiddal in Connemara, County Galway. His grandfather was Michael Morris, 1st Baron Killanin, who had served as Lord Chief Justice of the King's Bench for Ireland from 1887 to 1889. The Morrises were one of the fourteen families making up the Tribes of Galway. On 1 September 1914, early in the First World War, Killanin's father was killed in action near Villers-Cotterêts, France, while commanding the Irish Guards.

His Australian-born mother, Dora Maryon Wesley Hall (1891–1948), was the second-eldest daughter of English-born James Wesley Hall (1839–1901) and Australian Mary Dora Frederica Hall (née Dempster; 1864–1895). Wesley Hall was the first general manager of the Mount Morgan Gold Mining Company Limited in the Colony of Queensland, Australia, from 1886 to 1891. He was born in Kington, Herefordshire, England, to Walter Hall, a miller, and Elizabeth Carleton Skarratt. Lord Killanin's maternal grandmother, Dora Hall, was born in Williamstown, Colony of Victoria, to William Dempster, a bank manager, and Margaret Herbert Davies.

Killanin was educated at Summerfields, Eton College, the Sorbonne in Paris and then Magdalene College, Cambridge, where he was President of the Footlights dramatic club. In the mid-1930s, he began his career as a journalist on Fleet Street, working for the Daily Express, the Daily Sketch and subsequently the Daily Mail. In 1937–38, he was war correspondent during the Second Sino-Japanese War.

In July 1927, he succeeded his father's older brother Martin Morris to become Baron Killanin, which gave him an hereditary seat in the House of Lords at Westminster as it was a peerage in the Peerage of the United Kingdom.

== Family ==
Lord Killanin married (Mary) Sheila Cathcart Dunlop (1919–2007), MBE, of Oughterard, County Galway, in 1945. She was the granddaughter of Henry Dunlop, who built Lansdowne Road Rugby Ground in Ballsbridge, Dublin, in 1872. Her father was Douglas Canon Lyall Chandler Dunlop, Church of Ireland Rector of Oughterard. Lord and Lady Killanin had three sons: George Redmond ("Red"), Michael ("Mouse"), and John ("Johnny"), and a daughter, Monica Deborah.

== Military career ==
In November 1938, the young Lord Killanin was commissioned into the Queen's Westminsters, a territorial regiment of the British Army, where he was responsible for recruiting fellow journalists, including future Daily Telegraph editor Bill Deedes, and friends who were musicians and actors. He reached the rank of major and took part in the planning of D-Day and the Battle of Normandy in 1944, acting as brigade major for 30th Armoured Brigade, part of the 79th Armoured Division. He was appointed, due to the course of operations, a Member of the Order of the British Empire (MBE). After being demobilised, he went to Ireland. He was awarded the Territorial Efficiency Medal in 1946, and the Efficiency Decoration in 1950. He resigned his TA commission in 1951.

== President of the IOC ==
In 1950, Lord Killanin became the head of the Olympic Council of Ireland (the OCI), and became his country's representative in the IOC in 1952. He became senior vice-president in 1968, and succeeded Avery Brundage, becoming President elect at the 73rd IOC Session (21–24 August) held in Munich prior to the 1972 Summer Olympics. He took office soon after the Games.

During his presidency, the Olympic movement experienced a difficult period, dealing with the financial flop of the 1976 Montreal Olympics and the international boycott of the 1980 Moscow Olympics. Denver, originally selected to host the 1976 Winter Olympics, withdrew and had to be replaced by Innsbruck. The cities of Lake Placid and Los Angeles were chosen for 1980 Winter and 1984 Summer Games by default due to a lack of competing bids. Killanin retired after the Moscow Olympics in 1980, and was succeeded by Juan Antonio Samaranch. He was later unanimously elected Honorary Life President.

== Other positions ==
Killanin served as Honorary Consul-General of Monaco in Ireland from 1961 to 1984.

Killanin served as Chairman of the Race Committee for Galway Racecourse from 1970 to 1985. In his acceptance speech on behalf of the Galway Race Committee when accepting an award for its contribution to Irish Racing in 2013 the then chairman Tim Naughton said Lord Killanin's appointment as Chairman of the Race Committee in the early 1970s was instrumental in setting in motion a train of development that has resulted in the venue not only becoming a top horse-racing destination but also an attractive tourist destination. A keen horse racing enthusiast, Killanin also served as a steward of the Irish Turf Club on two occasions and on the National Hunt Steeplechase Committee.

In his business life Killanin was a director of many companies including Shell Ireland, Ulster Bank, Beamish and Crawford, and Chubb Ireland. He was a founder member of An Taisce (The National Trust for Ireland) and was chairman of the National Monuments Advisory Council until his death.

In 1948 Killanin was invested as a Knight of Honour and Devotion in the Irish Association of the Sovereign Military Order of Malta.

== Film ==
Lord Killanin also worked in the film industry, collaborating with his lifelong friend, John Ford, on The Quiet Man, when he acted as a general factotum, and later producing two of Ford's films The Rising of the Moon and Gideon’s Day, as well as the film The Playboy of the Western World.

== Death ==
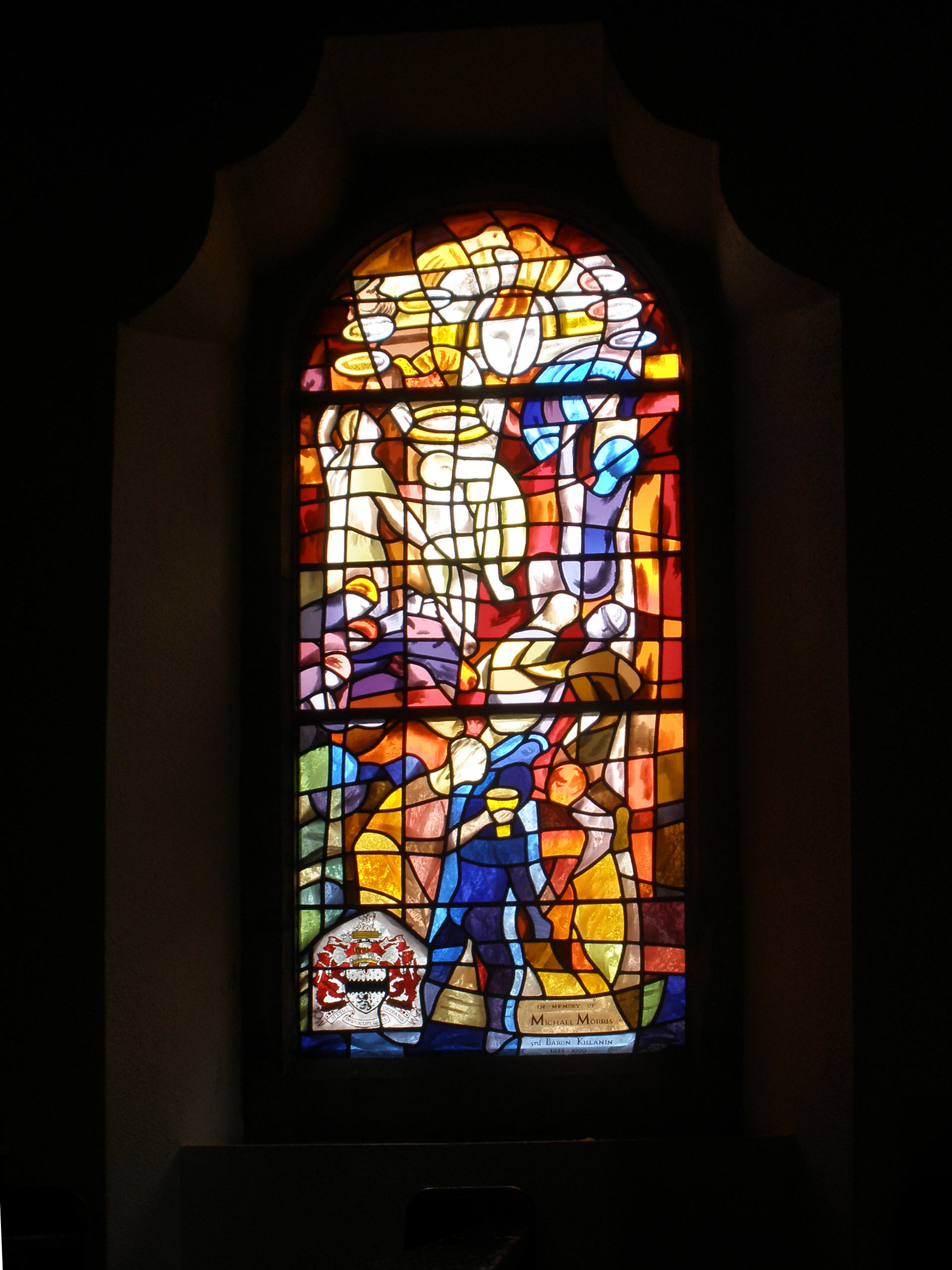
Commemorative stained glass window for Killanin in Spiddal

Killanin died at his home in Dublin aged 84 and, following a bilingual funeral Mass at St Enda's Church in Spiddal, County Galway, he was buried in the family vault in Bohermore Cemetery, Galway.

== Arms ==
Coat of arms of Michael Morris, 3rd Baron Killanin
Coronet That of a Baron. Crest On a fasces Proper a lion’s head erased Argent gutté de sang. Escutcheon Ermine a fess indented Sable in base a lion rampant of the last armed and langued Gules. Motto Si Deus Nobiscum Quis Contra Nos

== Selected works ==
- Four days, an account of the 1938 Munich crisis, edited by Lord Killanin. London, W. Heinemann, Ltd. (1938).
- Sir Godfrey Kneller & His Times, by Lord Killanin. B. T. Batsford Ltd., (England) (1948).
- Olympic Games, by Lord Killanin. Macmillan Publishing Company (1 February 1976), ISBN 0-02-975730-4.
- Shell Guide to Ireland, by Lord Killanin, M.V. Duignan, Peter Harbison (Editor). Macmillan; 3Rev Ed edition (May 1989). ISBN 0-333-46957-7.
- The Fitzroy: The Autobiography of a London Tavern, by Lord Killanin, Sally Fiber, and Clive Powell-Williams. Temple House; 1st edition (21 August 1995). ISBN 1-85776-023-9.
- My Olympic Years, by Lord Killanin. Martin Secker & Warburg Ltd; First Edition (9 May 1983). ISBN 0-436-23340-1.
- My Ireland: A Personal Impression, by Lord Killanin. Gallery Books (Nov 1987). ISBN 0-8317-6286-1.

== Sources ==
- British Army Officers 1939−1945
- Lord Killanin. The Guardian obituary. Retrieved: 2010-10-23.
- Lord Killanin, Olympic Leader, Dies at 84 by Richard Goldstein (two pages). The New York Times obituary, 26 April 1999. Retrieved: 2010-10-23.
- An Irishman and his family: Lord Morris and Killanin, by Maud Wynne. Publisher: J. Murray (1937).
- Lord Killanin (1914–1999), Maire Boran, Journal of the Galway Archaeological and Historical Society, Volume 53, 2001, 218–19.

Civic offices
Preceded by (United States) Avery Brundage	President of the International Olympic Committee; 1972–1980	Succeeded by (Spain) Juan Antonio Samaranch
Peerage of the United Kingdom
Preceded by Martin Morris	Baron Killanin; 1927–1999	Succeeded by Red Morris
