= Michael Morris, Baron Morris =

Irish lawyer and judge

The Right Honourable The Lord Morris PC PC (Ire)
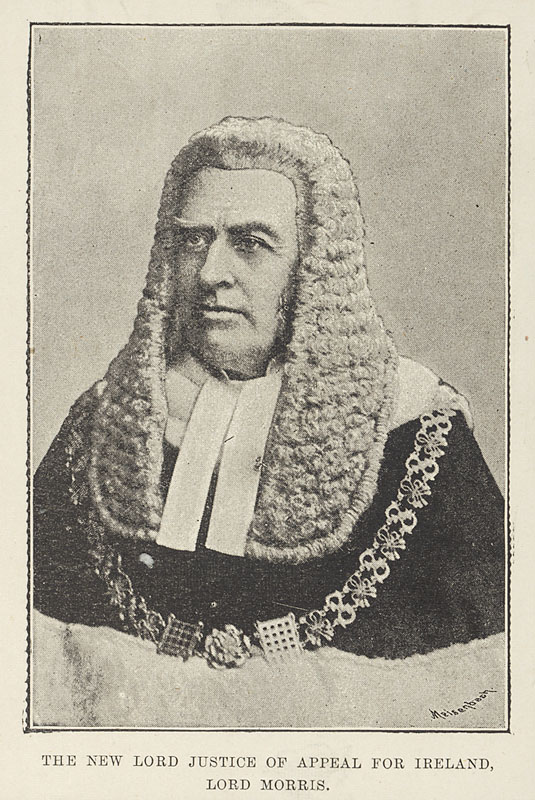

Lord Chief Justice of the King's Bench for Ireland
- In office 1887–1889
- Monarch: Victoria
- Preceded by: George Augustus Chichester May
- Succeeded by: Peter O'Brien

Personal details
- Born: 14 November 1826 Galway, County Galway
- Died: 8 September 1901 (aged 74) Spiddal, County Galway
- Education: Trinity College Dublin

Michael Morris, Baron Morris and 1st Baron Killanin, PC, PC (Ire) (14 November 1826 – 8 September 1901), known as Sir Michael Morris, Bt, from 1885 to 1889, was an Irish lawyer and judge. He was Lord Chief Justice of the King's Bench for Ireland from 1887 to 1889 and sat in the House of Lords as a Lord of Appeal in Ordinary from 1889 to 1900.

== Background and education ==
Born in Galway, eldest son of Martin Morris and Julia Blake, Morris was educated at Galway College and Trinity College Dublin, graduating BA in 1847. His father was a justice of the peace, and in 1841 became the first Roman Catholic to be High Sheriff of Galway Town, an office his son also held. The Morrises were a long-established merchant family, who were one of the fourteen Tribes of Galway who dominated the town's commercial life. His mother, a doctor's daughter, died of cholera in 1837.

== Legal and judicial career ==
After being called to the Irish bar in 1849, Morris was appointed High Sheriff of Galway Town for 1849–50. Eight years later he was made Recorder of Galway, and in 1863 became one of the country's Queen's Counsels. He was the recognized leader of the Connacht Bar, impressing clients and juries alike with his wit and commonsense. Elected to Parliament in 1865 as Liberal member for Galway Borough, Morris became a Conservative the following year when he took office in Lord Derby's administration as Solicitor-General for Ireland. Though a Roman Catholic he was a staunch supporter of the Act of Union 1800, but it is said that he was not enthusiastic about the Reform Act 1867. In late 1866 he was appointed Attorney-General for Ireland, and the following year became third Justice of the Court of Common Pleas, eventually being made its Chief Justice in 1876. As a judge, he showed the same wit and commonsense which had been his hallmarks at the Bar, and was notably impatient of legal technicalities.

On 14 September 1885, Morris was created a Baronet, of Spiddal in the County of Galway, and two years later he was appointed Lord Chief Justice of the King's Bench for Ireland. In 1889, on being made a Lord of Appeal in Ordinary, he was given a life peerage as Baron Morris, of Spiddal in the County of Galway, and sworn a member of the Privy Council. He was well regarded by his fellow Law Lords, despite his frequent dissenting judgments.

Eleven years later, on his retirement from office, Lord Morris was made an hereditary peer as Baron Killanin, of Galway in the County of Galway.

=== Judgements ===
- British South Africa Co v Companhia de Moçambique [1893] AC 602 – the House of Lords overturned a Court of Appeal decision and by so doing established the Mozambique rule, a common law rule in private international law that renders actions relating to title in foreign land, the right to possession of foreign land, and trespass to foreign land non-justiciable in common law jurisdictions.
- Harvey v Facey, 1893

== Family ==
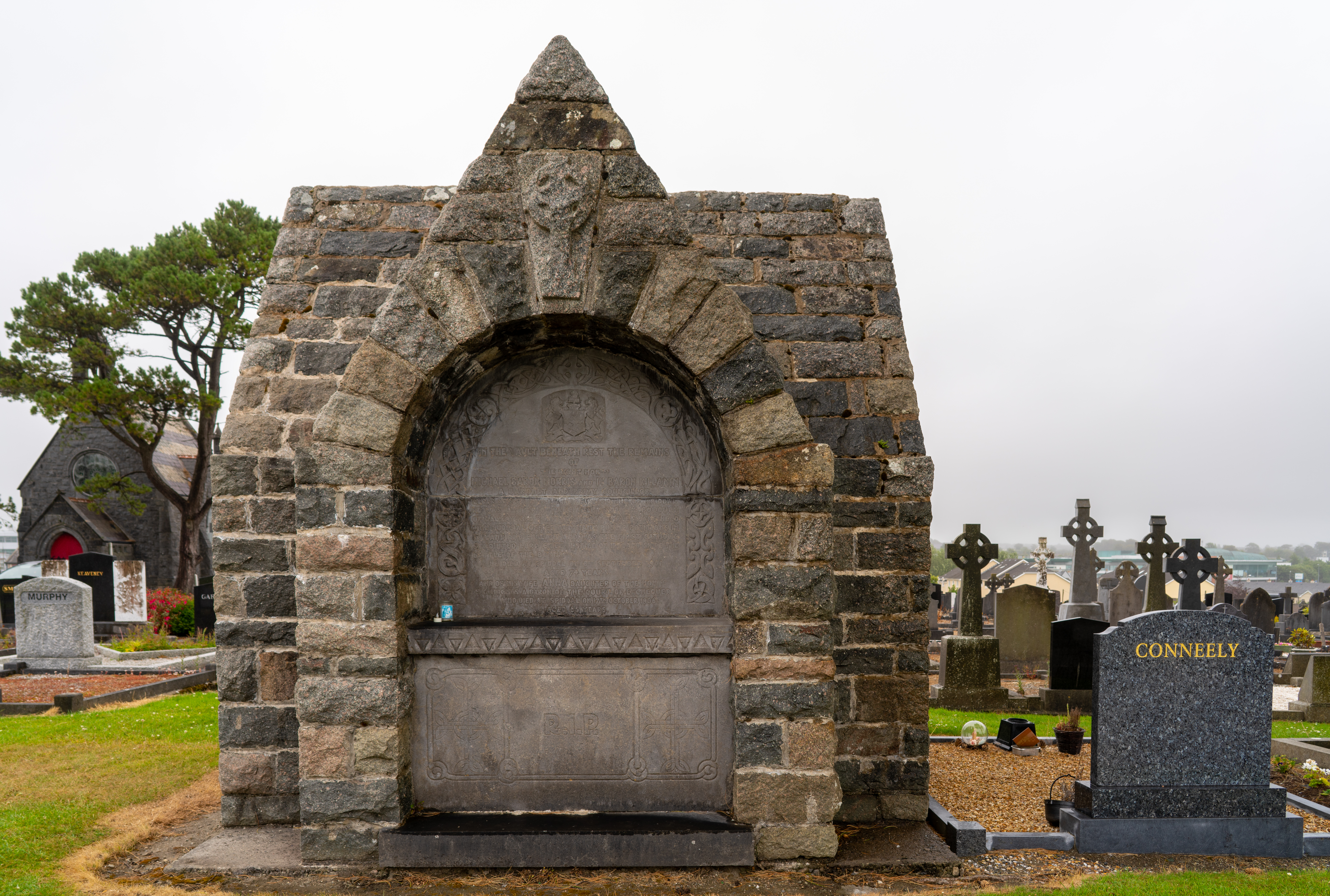
Family vault of Michael Morris, 1st Baron Killanin, in Bohermore Cemetery, Galway

Lord Morris died at Spiddal in September 1901, aged 74, and was buried in the family vault in Bohermore Cemetery at Galway.

He married, in 1860, Anna Hughes, daughter of Henry George Hughes, Baron of the Court of Exchequer and his wife Sarah Isabella l'Estrange. She was the child of a mixed marriage, and had been brought up in the Church of Ireland. They had four sons and six daughters. The eldest son Martin Morris was an MP and succeeded in the barony of Killanin and baronetcy.

Another son was Lt. Col. George Henry Morris, who was the first commanding officer to lead an Irish Guards battalion into battle and was killed in action during the Retreat from Mons in September 1914. George's son Michael went on to serve as the sixth President of the International Olympic Committee (IOC) from 1972 to 1980. He succeeded his uncle Martin as Baron Killanin in 1927.

Coat of arms of Michael Morris, Baron Morris
Crest On a fasces Proper a lion’s head erased Argent gutté de sang. Escutcheon Ermine a fess indented Sable in base a lion rampant of the last armed and langued Gules. Motto Si Deus Nobiscum Quis Contra Nos

Parliament of the United Kingdom
Preceded by John Orrell Lever; Lord Dunkellin	Member of Parliament for Galway Borough; 1865–1867; With: Sir Rowland Blennerhasset, Bt	Succeeded by Sir Rowland Blennerhasset, Bt; George Morris
Legal offices
Preceded by Edward Sullivan	Solicitor-General for Ireland; August–November 1866	Succeeded by Hedges Eyre Chatterton
Preceded by John Edward Walsh	Attorney-General for Ireland; 1866–1867	Succeeded by Hedges Eyre Chatterton
Preceded by James Henry Monahan	Chief Justice of the Irish Common Pleas; 1876–1887	Office abolished
Preceded by George Augustus Chichester May	Lord Chief Justice of the King's Bench for Ireland; 1887–1889	Succeeded by Peter O'Brien
Peerage of the United Kingdom
New creation	Baron Killanin; 1900–1901	Succeeded by Martin Morris
Baronetage of the United Kingdom
New creation	Baronet (of Spiddal); 1885–1901	Succeeded by Martin Morris
