= Redmond Morris, 4th Baron Killanin =

Irish film producer (born 1947)

George Redmond Fitzpatrick Morris, 4th Baron Killanin (born 26 January 1947), is an Irish film producer.

Morris was born in Dublin, Ireland, into a notable Irish family. He is the eldest son of Michael Morris, 3rd Baron Killanin, formerly the president of the International Olympic Committee, and Mary Sheila Cathcart Dunlop. His mother was the daughter of Canon Douglas Dunlop, Rector of Oughterard, and the granddaughter of Henry Dunlop, who was involved in the construction of Lansdowne Road in 1872.

Morris was educated at Gonzaga College in Ranelagh, Dublin, and at Ampleforth College and, later, at Trinity College Dublin. In the 1970s he worked as an assistant director, before becoming production manager in such films as The Draughtsman's Contract and Gorky Park, before moving into overall production and executive production.

Lord Killanin is usually credited as Redmond Morris in film productions. He is usually known to family and close friends as Red Morris.

He has two brothers; the racehorse trainer Mouse, and John, and a sister, Deborah.

== Filmography (as producer) ==
- The Miracle (1991)
- Splitting Heirs (1993)
- Interview with the Vampire: The Vampire Chronicles (1994)
- Michael Collins (1996)
- The Butcher Boy (1997)
- The Affair of the Necklace (2001)
- The Actors (2003)
- The Wind That Shakes the Barley (2006)
- Notes on a Scandal (2006)
- The Reader (2008)
- Neverland (2011)
- Byzantium (2012)
- The Rhythm Section (2020)
- The Dig (2021)
- Marlowe (2022)

== Arms ==
Coat of arms of Redmond Morris, 4th Baron Killanin
Crest On a fasces Proper a lion’s head erased Argent gutté de sang. Escutcheon Ermine a fess indented Sable in base a lion rampant of the last armed and langued Gules. Motto Si Deus Nobiscum Quis Contra Nos

Peerage of the United Kingdom
Preceded by Michael Morris	Baron Killanin; 1999–present	Incumbent
