= Masal Bugduv =

Fictional Moldovan footballer

Masal Bugduv is a fictional Moldovan youth footballer who was the subject of a hoax. He was created by Irish journalist Declan Varley, as a social experiment.

The photo used by The Times was actually of English footballer Jack Wilshere (at the time an Arsenal player), taken on 2 August 2008 during a pre-season friendly between Arsenal and Juventus at the Emirates Stadium.

== History ==
With a fabricated backstory describing a teenage prodigy on a web of blog postings, evidently created by different people with different accounts, reports of the youth talent were ultimately published in a The Times article titled "Football's top 50 rising stars", as well as in When Saturday Comes and Goal.com. As a means to establish credibility to the identity, the creators of the hoax planted text into Wikipedia articles and forged Associated Press reports. The erroneous information remained in Wikipedia from July 2008 to January 2009.

The entry in The Times read, "30. Masal Bugduv (FC Olimpia Bălţi): Moldova’s finest, the 16-year-old attacker has been strongly linked with a move to Arsenal, work permit permitting. And he’s been linked with plenty of other top clubs as well."

The Times later removed Masal from their list and published a clarification. Goal.com printed an apology for the mention of "phantom prodigy Masal Bugduv", stating the information had come from "a fake Associated Press report."

Masal Bugduv sounds very similar to the Irish pronunciation of M'asal Beag Dubh (My Little Black Donkey), a story by the Irish-language writer Pádraic Ó Conaire about a dishonest salesman who seeks an exaggerated price for a lazy donkey. This, in return, made people believe of his existence. John Burns of The Sunday Times suggested that the Ó Conaire story was indeed the inspiration for the entire hoax, and that the prank, which also included a fake Moldovan newspaper titled Diario Mo Thon (Diary My Ass), was in effect a satire on the football transfer market.

Brian Phillips, a blogger of Runofplay.com, described in an article for Slate the anatomy of the hoax, featuring a testimony email of "the alleged hoaxer's lengthy explanation of the Bugduv-creation process".

In 2017, Irish journalist Declan Varley revealed that he created Bugduv as a social experiment, frustrated by having to sieve through countless speculations about football transfers.

== Translation of M'asal Beag Dubh ==
- Eoghan Ó Tuairisc (trans.), Pádraic Ó Conaire, The Woman at the Window, Swords: Poolbeg Press, 1966.
- Eoghan Ó Tuairisc's translation reprinted as "My Little Black Ass" in The Oxford Book of Irish Short Stories, edited by William Trevor. Oxford: Oxford University Press, 1989 (reissued 2010), pp. 267-270.

== See also ==
- List of hoaxes
