= Romans 7 =

- ← chapter 6 chapter 8 →
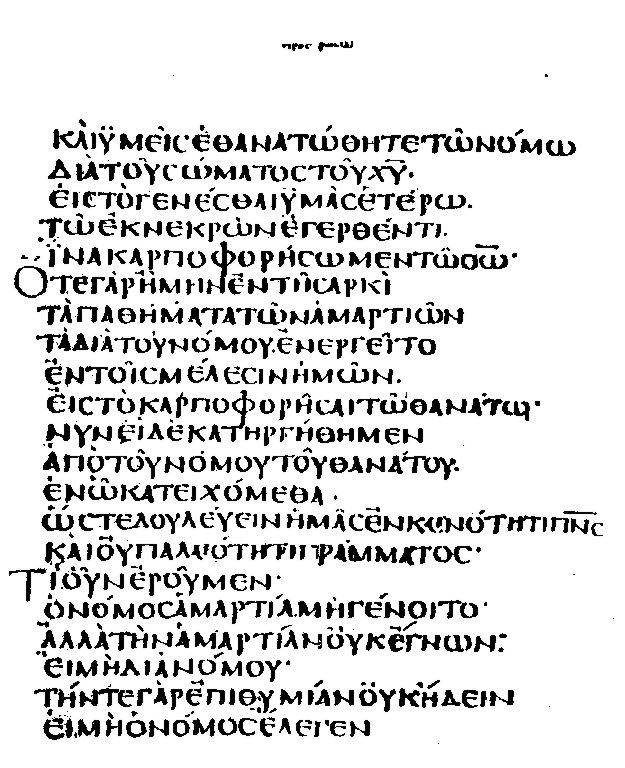
- The Greek text of Romans 7:4–7 in Codex Claromontanus, from c. AD 550
- Book: Epistle to the Romans
- Category: Pauline epistles
- Christian Bible part: New Testament
- Order in the Christian part: 6

Romans 7 is the seventh chapter of the Epistle to the Romans in the New Testament of the Christian Bible. It is authored by Paul the Apostle, while he was in Corinth in the mid-50s AD, with the help of an amanuensis (secretary), Tertius, who adds his own greeting in Romans 16:22.

== Text ==
The original text was written in Koine Greek. This chapter is divided into 25 verses.

=== Textual witnesses ===
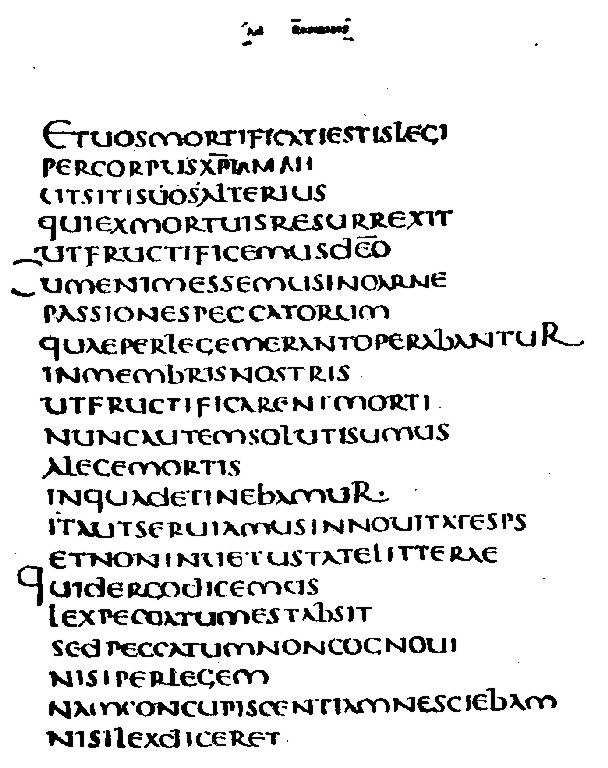
The Latin text of Romans 7:4–7 from Codex Claromontanus.

Some early manuscripts containing the text of this chapter are:

- Codex Vaticanus (AD 325–350)
- Codex Sinaiticus (330–360)
- Codex Alexandrinus (400–440)
- Codex Ephraemi Rescriptus (~450; complete)

=== Old Testament references ===
- Romans 7:7 references Exodus 20:17 and Deuteronomy 5:21

== Lifelong authority of the Law (7:1–4) ==
The concluding discussion in chapter 6 on slavery and freedom leads to the reintroduction of the topic of "the law and sin", that a believer has died not only to sin (6:3) but also to the law (verses 1–4).

=== Verse 1 ===
Do you not know, brothers (for I speak to those who know the law), that the law has dominion over a man as long as he lives?

— Romans 7:1, Modern English Version

- "Has dominion" or "rules"; writing to "those who know the [Jewish] Law, Paul says that the Law has authority over a man (only) (Note: "Only" is added, for example, by the New Century Version and New International Version) "as long as he lives".

Jewish Christians in Rome would have been familiar with the Hebrew Bible, but many commentators recognise that "the whole Roman Church, whether Jewish or Gentile, would be familiar with it; many of them having been disciples of the synagogue, and all being directed constantly to the use of the Old Testament by apostolic precept and example". William Robertson Nicoll, however, argues that "neither Roman nor Mosaic law is specially referred to: the argument rests on the nature of law in general".

=== Verse 2 ===
For the woman who has a husband is bound by the law to her husband as long as he lives. But if the husband dies, she is released from the law of her husband.

— Romans 7:2, New King James Version

Marriage provides an example of Paul's point in verse 1. Hill considers the example to be "somewhat forced".

=== Verse 3 ===
So then if, while her husband lives, she marries another man, she will be called an adulteress; but if her husband dies, she is free from that law, so that she is no adulteress, though she has married another man.

— Romans 7:3, New King James Version

The one who dies is the "law", metaphorically "the husband", so from that time, the wife (the believer) is no longer subject to his authority, that is "may not be judged a sinner" ('an adulterer') when remarrying. On the other hand, when the law has not died, one who disregards it (like a person who has an affair) may be judged as a sinner.

=== Verse 4 ===
Therefore, my brethren, you also have become dead to the law through the body of Christ, that you may be married to another – to Him who was raised from the dead, that we should bear fruit to God.

— Romans 7:4, New King James Version

The conclusion "you [therefore] have died to the law through the body of Christ" aligns with the statement in verse 1 that "the law is binding on a person only during a person's lifetime".

== The law provides knowledge of sin (7:5–25) ==
A connection between 'law' and 'sin' was stated in the earlier parts of the epistle (Romans 3:20, 4:15, 5:13, and 5:20), but because this is regarded "surprising and controversial" for most readers, Paul elaborates more in chapter 6 and 7, especially in verses 5–12 where the law itself is said to be a cause of sin.

=== Verse 5 ===
When your old nature was still active, sinful desires were at work within you, making you want to do whatever God said not to and producing sinful deeds, the rotting fruit of death

— Romans 7:5, The Living Bible

=== Verse 6 ===
But now you need no longer worry about the Jewish laws and customs because you “died” while in their captivity, and now you can really serve God; not in the old way, mechanically obeying a set of rules, but in the new way, with all of your hearts and minds.

— Romans 7:6, The Living Bible

=== Verse 7 ===
Paul asks a rhetorical question in verse 7:

Is the law sin? Certainly not! [μη γενοιτο, mē genoito] (Note: See Romans 6#The bearing of justification by grace upon a holy life) But if it had not been for the Law, I would not have known [i.e. recognised] sin

— Romans 7:7, Contemporary English Version

=== Verse 25 ===
I thank God through Jesus Christ our Lord. So then with the mind I myself serve the law of God; but with the flesh the law of sin.

— Romans 7:25, King James Version

The second part of verse 25 may be paraphrased as "Thus, left to myself, I serve...", which may better capture Paul's meaning. It should take account of Romans 8:1–7, as the person "with [the] flesh", "a slave to the law of sin" in this verse will be the believer "not in the flesh" in chapter 8 (Romans 8:9) and is "set free from the law of sin" (Romans 8:2). Therefore, the final sentence of this verse seems to state the "best claim to be a description of believers" as it apparently comes with Paul's Christian thanksgiving (after verse 24). But since Paul did not know Christ's name at verse 24, then prior to and including verse 25 he was not speaking as a Christian, but as one still in bondage to sin, only exclaiming that, yes, there IS an answer, but then continuing with his explanation of death under the old covenant by stating that the MIND of natural man under law is subject to two laws, the one being the law of God but the other which dominates him as the law of sin. Only in 8:2 is he depicted to be set free from the law of sin as a Christian.

== See also ==
- Ten Commandments
- Torah
- Related Bible parts: Exodus 20, Deuteronomy 5, Romans 6, Romans 8

== Sources ==
- Coogan, Michael David (2007). Coogan, Michael David; Brettler, Marc Zvi; Newsom, Carol Ann; Perkins, Pheme (eds.). The New Oxford Annotated Bible with the Apocryphal/Deuterocanonical Books: New Revised Standard Version, Issue 48 (Augmented 3rd ed.). Oxford University Press. ISBN 9780195288810.
- Hill, Craig C. (2007). "64. Romans". In Barton, John; Muddiman, John (eds.). The Oxford Bible Commentary (first (paperback) ed.). Oxford University Press. pp. 1083–1108. ISBN 978-0199277186.
- Moo, Douglas J. (1994). "Romans". In Carson, D. A.; France, R. T.; Motyer, J. A.; Wenham, G. J. (eds.). New Bible Commentary: 21st Century Edition (4, illustrated, reprint, revised ed.). Inter-Varsity Press. pp. 1115–1160. ISBN 9780851106489.
