= Romans 6 =

- ← chapter 5 chapter 7 →
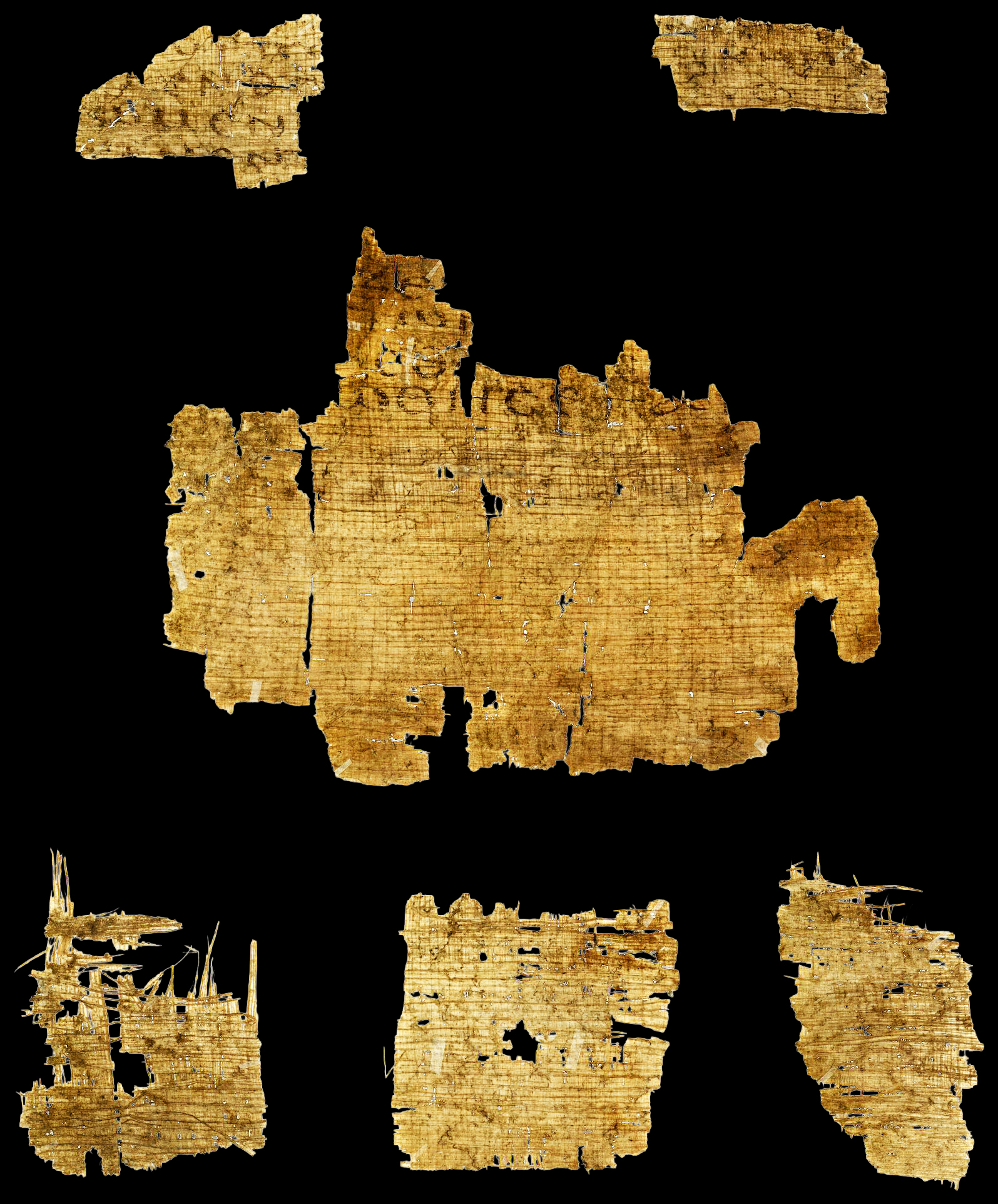
- Fragments c to h containing parts of the Epistle to the Romans in Papyrus 40, written c. AD 250
- Book: Epistle to the Romans
- Category: Pauline epistles
- Christian Bible part: New Testament
- Order in the Christian part: 6

Romans 6 is the sixth chapter of the Epistle to the Romans in the New Testament of the Christian Bible. It was authored by Paul the Apostle, while he was in Corinth in the mid-50s AD, with the help of an amanuensis (secretary), Tertius, who added his own greeting in Romans 16:22.

In this chapter, Paul shows to the believers in Rome that the Christian, in baptism, dies to sin, and "in what sense, and to what extent, Christ's dominion is a present reality" in the lives of the believers stands as an underlying issue in this chapter.

== Text ==
The original text was written in Koine Greek. This chapter is divided into 23 verses.

=== Textual witnesses ===
Some early manuscripts containing the text of this chapter are:

- Papyrus 40 (~AD 250; extant verses 4–5, 16)
- Codex Vaticanus (325–350)
- Codex Sinaiticus (330–360)
- Codex Alexandrinus (400–440)
- Codex Ephraemi Rescriptus (~450; complete)
- Papyrus 94 (5th/6th century; extant verses 10–13, 19–22)

=== New Testament references ===
- Romans 6:1 references Romans 3:8
- Romans 6:3 references Matthew 28:19

== The bearing of justification by grace upon a holy life ==
According to Protestant theologian Heinrich Meyer, chapter 6 shows how the righteousness of God, "so far from furthering immorality, on the contrary excludes the latter from the Christian state, and for the first time rightly establishes, promotes, and quickens true morality". Meyer anticipates that Romans 7 "shows the same in relation to the law", and Romans 8 "sets forth the blessed condition of those who as justified are morally free". From the beginning of this chapter, Paul addresses the "plausible objection" that Christians should "continue in sin, that grace may abound" (Romans 6:1). In Romans 3:8, Paul had referred to slanderous reports to the effect that believers taught "Let us do evil that good may come". Similar indications can be found in Galatians 5:13, 1 Peter 2:16 and Jude 4.

=== Verse 1 ===
Shall we continue in sin, that grace may abound?

Meyer notes that the alternatives available are either to "continue in sin" or to "cease from it", although an alternative exhortation in Romans 11:22 is for the Christian to "continue in [God's] goodness".

=== Verse 2 ===
Paul replies that believers should "certainly not (μὴ γένοιτο, mē genoito) continue in sin, that grace may abound" (Romans 6:2). The phrase μη γενοιτο is regularly used by Paul; it is used 10 times in this epistle, as well as in his other writings. The Pulpit Commentary describes the phrase as "Paul's usual way of rejecting an idea indignantly". The phrase has been translated in various forms:

- 'God forbid' (Wycliffe Bible, King James Version and 1599 Geneva Bible)
- 'By no means' (New International Version)
- 'Of course not' (New Living Translation)
- 'Absolutely not' (Holman Christian Standard Bible)
- 'That's unthinkable' (God's Word Translation)
- 'Far be the thought' (Darby Bible Translation)
- "Let the thought be abhorred' (Matthew Henry's Commentary)
- 'I should hope not!' (The Message)

The phrase is also used in the Gospel of Luke's conclusion to the parable of the wicked husbandmen.

== Dead to sin but alive to God in Christ (verses 3–14) ==
=== Verse 3 ===
You have been taught that when we were baptised in Christ Jesus we were baptised in his death.

Hill notes that the identification of the baptised believer with the death of Jesus is "substantial, not moralistic; one actually participates with Jesus in his death". The believer's faith, explored throughout the preceding chapters, is not separated from his or her baptism: they go together.

=== Verse 4 ===
Therefore we were buried with Him through baptism into death, that just as Christ was raised from the dead by the glory of the Father, even so we also should walk in newness of life.

— Romans 6:4, New King James Version

- "Of life": from ζωῆς, zōēs; here functions as an attributed genitive.

== From slaves of sin to slaves of God (verses 15–23) ==
=== Verse 23 ===
For the wages of sin is death, but the gift of God is eternal life in Christ Jesus our Lord.

— Romans 6:23, New King James Version

- "Wages": from Greek ὀψώνιον, opsōnion, referring to 'a soldier's pay or wages', but here to 'the end result of an activity' or 'something back in return' ('payoff').

== See also ==
- Baptism
- Related Bible parts: Matthew 28

== Bibliography ==
- Coogan, Michael David (2007). Coogan, Michael David; Brettler, Marc Zvi; Newsom, Carol Ann; Perkins, Pheme (eds.). The New Oxford Annotated Bible with the Apocryphal/Deuterocanonical Books: New Revised Standard Version, Issue 48 (Augmented 3rd ed.). Oxford University Press. ISBN 9780195288810.
- Hill, Craig C. (2007). "64. Romans". In Barton, John; Muddiman, John (eds.). The Oxford Bible Commentary (first (paperback) ed.). Oxford University Press. pp. 1083–1108. ISBN 978-0199277186.
