= Harvey v Facey =

Legal case

Harvey v Facey [1893], is a contract law case decided by the United Kingdom Judicial Committee of the Privy Council on appeal from the Supreme Court of Judicature of Jamaica. In 1893 the Privy Council held final legal jurisdiction over most of the British Caribbean. Its importance in case law is that it defined the difference between an offer and supply of information. The Privy Council held that indication of lowest acceptable price does not constitute an offer to sell. Rather, it is considered a response to a request for information, specifically a "precise answer to a precise question" about the lowest acceptable price which the seller would consider.

== Application ==
The case involved negotiations over a property in Jamaica. The defendant, Mr LM Facey, had been carrying on negotiations with the Mayor and Council of Kingston to sell a piece of property to Kingston City. On 7 October 1893, Facey was traveling on a train between Kingston and Porus and the appellant, Harvey, who wanted the property to be sold to him rather than to the city, sent Facey a telegram. It said, "Will you sell us Bumper Hall Pen? Telegraph lowest cash price-answer paid". Facey replied on the same day: "Lowest price for Bumper Hall Pen £900." Harvey then replied in the following words. "We agree to buy Bumper Hall Pen for the sum of nine hundred pounds asked by you. Please send us your title deed in order that we may get early possession."

Facey, however refused to sell at that price, at which Harvey sued. Harvey had his action dismissed upon first trial presided over by Justice Curran, (who declared that the agreement as alleged by the Appellants did not denote a concluded contract) but won his claim on the Court of Appeal, which reversed the trial court decision, declaring that a binding agreement had been proved. The appellants obtained leave from the Supreme Court of Judicature of Jamaica to appeal to the Queen in Council (i.e. the Privy Council). The Privy Council reversed the Appeal court's opinion, reinstating the decision of Justice Curran in the very first trial and stating the reason for its action.

The Privy Council advised that no contract existed between the two parties. The first telegram was simply a request for information, so at no stage did the defendant make a definite offer that could be accepted. Lord Morris gave the following judgment.

In the view their Lordships take of this case it becomes unnecessary to consider several of the defences put forward on the part of the respondents, as their Lordships concur in the judgment of Mr. Justice Curran that there was no concluded contract between the appellants and L. M. Facey to be collected from the aforesaid telegrams. The first telegram asks two questions. The first question is as to the willingness of L. M. Facey to sell to the appellants; the second question asks the lowest price, and the word "Telegraph" is in its collocation addressed to that second question only. L. M. Facey replied to the second question only, and gives his lowest price. The third telegram from the appellants treats the answer of L. M. Facey stating his lowest price as an unconditional offer to sell to them at the price named. Their Lordships cannot treat the telegram from L. M. Facey as binding him in any respect, except to the extent it does by its terms, viz., the lowest price. Everything else is left open, and the reply telegram from the appellants cannot be treated as an acceptance of an offer to sell to them; it is an offer that required to be accepted by L. M. Facey. The contract could only be completed if L. M. Facey had accepted the appellant's last telegram. It has been contended for the appellants that L. M. Facey's telegram should be read as saying "yes" to the first question put in the appellants' telegram, but there is nothing to support that contention. L. M. Facey's telegram gives a precise answer to a precise question, viz., the price. The contract must appear by the telegrams, whereas the appellants are obliged to contend that an acceptance of the first question is to be implied. Their Lordships are of opinion that the mere statement of the lowest price at which the vendor would sell contains no implied contract to sell at that price to the persons making the inquiry. Their Lordships will therefore humbly advise Her Majesty that the judgment of the Supreme Court should be upheld. The appellants must pay to the respondents the costs of the appeal to the Supreme Court and of this appeal.

== See also ==
- English contract law
