= Deoraíocht =

1910 novel by Pádraic Ó Conaire

Deoraíocht (original spelling Deoraidheacht) is an Irish-language novel by Pádraic Ó Conaire. An English translation is published under the title Exile. Published in 1910, it is arguably (Peadar Ó Laoghaire's Séadna also being a contender for the position) the most important novel from the Gaelic revival. For many critics its radical social message, its sympathy with the poor and marginalised, its tendency to convey urban life honestly and fairly and its avoidance of romanticising rural life in comparison to urban life makes it the outstanding novel of the Gaelic revival.
