= George Henry Morris =

British Army officer (1872–1914)

The Honourable George Henry Morris
- Hon. George Henry Morris in 1913

Personal details
- Born: 16 July 1872 Spiddal, Ireland
- Died: 1 September 1914 (aged 42) near Villers-Cotterêts, France

Military service
- Branch/service: British Army
- Years of service: 1892–1914
- Rank: Lieutenant-Colonel
- Commands: 1st Battalion, Irish Guards
- Battles/wars: Boer War; First World War †

Lieutenant-Colonel the Hon. George Henry Morris (16 July 1872 – 1 September 1914) was the first commanding officer to lead an Irish Guards battalion into battle.

== Early life ==
George Henry Morris was born in Spiddal, County Galway, Ireland, the second son of Michael Morris, 1st Baron Killanin, and was educated at The Oratory School, Edgbaston. He joined The Rifle Brigade in India as Second Lieutenant in 1892, after having passed out from the Royal Military College, Sandhurst.

== Military career ==
In 1897 Morris was appointed adjutant of the 3rd Battalion, Rifle Brigade (The Prince Consort's Own), a position he held for four years. He saw active service with the Tochi Valley Expeditionary Force in 1897–98, receiving the medal with clasp.

In the second Second Boer War he served with Damant's Horse from 1901 to 1902, participating in operations in the Transvaal and Orange River Colony. He was twice Mentioned in Dispatches (including one dated 1 June 1902, where he is commended for good service during the Battle of Boschbult 31 March 1902) and received the Queen's South Africa Medal with four clasps.

On the conclusion of the war he rejoined the Staff College, which he had entered in January 1902, and passed out in 1903. Obtaining his majority on transfer to the Irish Guards in March 1906, he was next a General Staff Officer at the Army Staff College from 1908 to 1911, finally becoming Lieutenant-Colonel when succeeding Charles FitzClarence to the command of the 1st Battalion, Irish Guards in July 1913.

Morris took his battalion to France on 12 August 1914, at the outbreak of World War I and was killed in action on 1 September, during the Retreat from Mons when the 4th (Guards) Brigade formed a rear-guard for the 2nd Division in La forêt de Retz near Villers-Cotterêts where he is buried in the Guards' Grave.

Morris was recognised as one of the most brilliant lecturers in the British Army, and was an authority on strategy, tactics, and military history. He was a member of the Guards' Club, the Garrick Club and the County Galway Club.

== Personal life ==
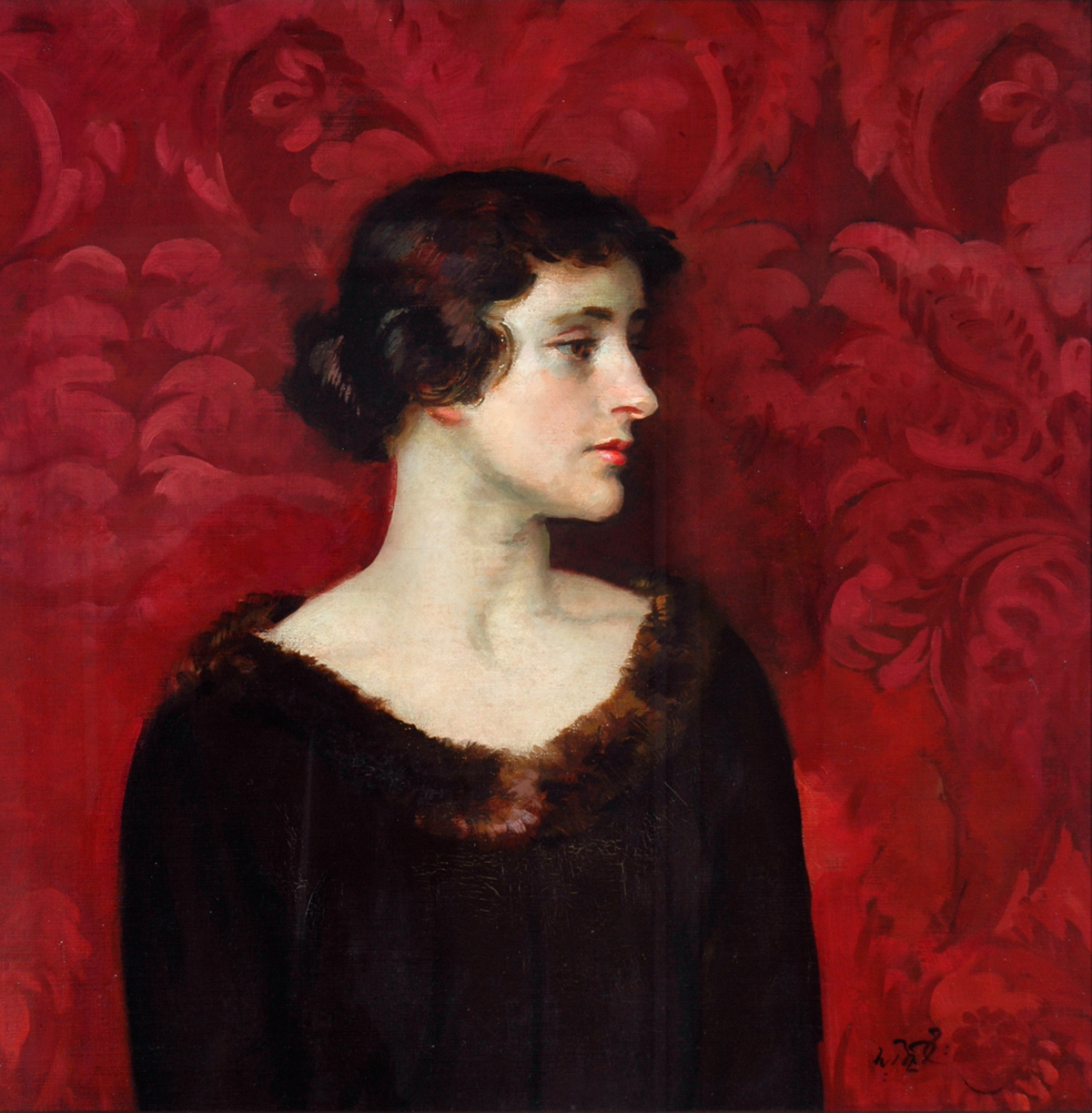
Mrs Gerard Tharp against Red Damask, ca 1920, by William Bruce Ellis Ranken

On 29 April 1913, he married Dora Maryan Hall, second daughter of James Wesley Hall, of Melbourne, Australia, younger brother of Walter Russell Hall at Westminster Cathedral in London.

Their son Michael Morris, born on 30 July 1914, succeeded as Lord Killanin when his uncle Martin Henry FitzPatrick Morris, 2nd Baron Killanin died in 1927 without an heir. He went on to serve as the sixth President of the International Olympic Committee (IOC) from 1972 to 1980.

After Lieut.-Col. Hon. George Henry Morris's death, Dora Maryan Hall married Colonel Gerard Tharp on 12 March 1918. She died on 5 May 1948.
