= Bohermore =

Area of Galway city, Ireland

Coordinates: 53.281°N 9.0386°W

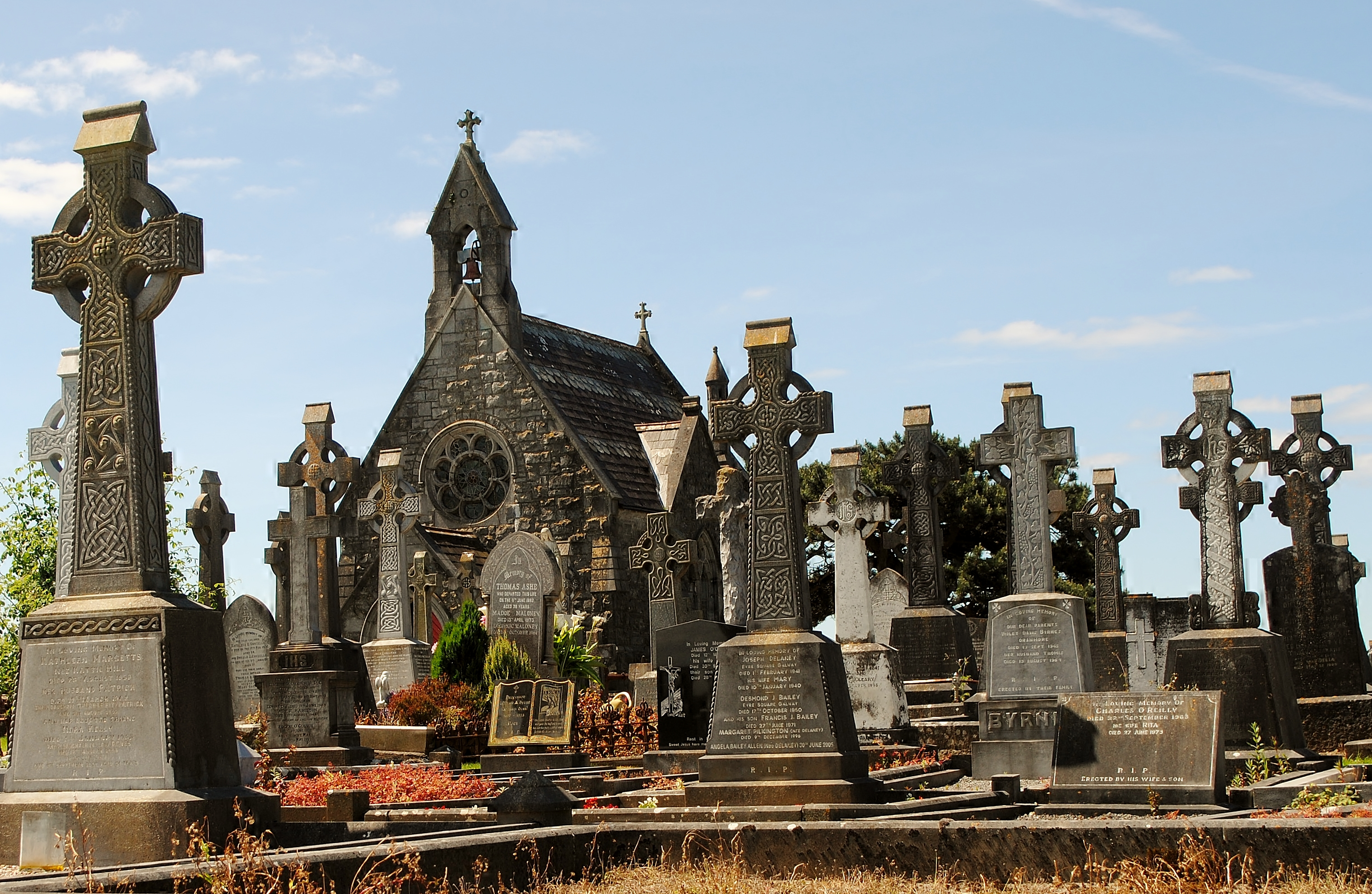
Bohermore Cemetery

Bohermore (Irish: An Bóthar Mór, meaning 'the big road') is an area of Galway, Ireland. It got this name as it was the main road into Galway City from the east in medieval times.

The area is known as the location of the large Bohermore Cemetery, also called the "New Cemetery" in the area. It is one of two cemeteries operated by Galway City Council.

== Association football ==
Galway Hibernians ground in Bohermore, Galway City

Galway & District League club Galway Hibernians are located in Bohermore, having played football in the area since 1942.

== Notable people ==
- Pat O'Shea, author
