= Pádraic Ó Conaire =

Irish writer and journalist (1882–1928)

- Born: Patrick Joseph Conroy; 20 February 1882; Galway, Ireland
- Died: 6 October 1928 (aged 46); Dublin, Ireland
- Occupations: Novelist; short story writer, essayist; journalist; school teacher
- Spouse: Molly Ní Mhanais
- Writing career
- Pen name: None
- Language: Irish
- Genres: Fiction; satire; folklore
- Notable works: Deoraíocht; Scothscéalta

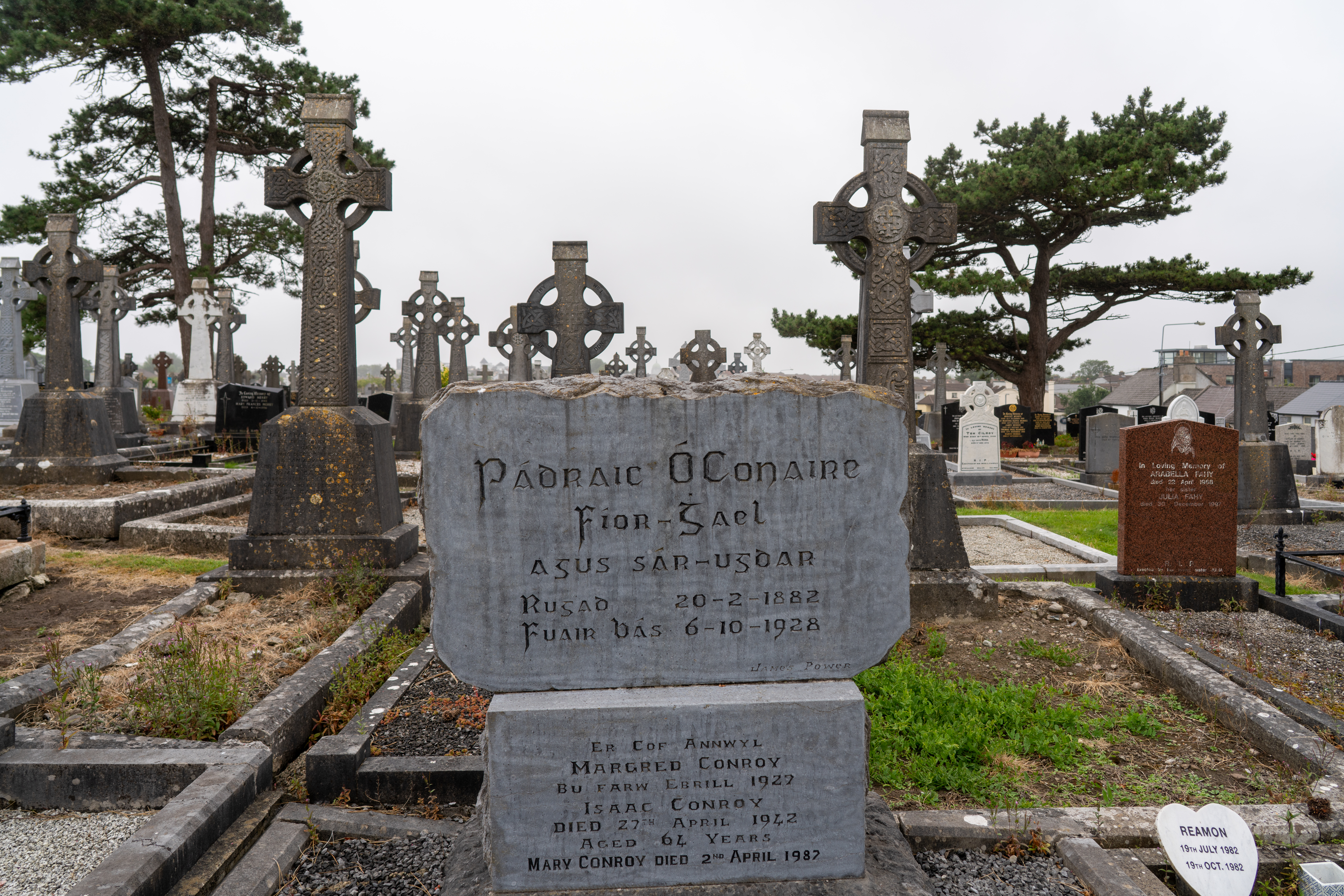
Pádraic Ó Conaire's grave in Bohermore Cemetery

Pádraic Ó Conaire (28 February 1882 – 6 October 1928) was an Irish writer and journalist whose production was primarily in the Irish language. In his lifetime he wrote 26 books, 473 stories, 237 essays and 6 plays. His acclaimed novel Deoraíocht has been described by Angela Bourke as 'the earliest example of modernist fiction in Irish'.

== Life ==
Ó Conaire was born in the Lobster Pot public house on the New Docks in Galway on 28 February 1882. His father was a publican, who owned two premises in the town. His mother was Kate McDonagh. He was orphaned by the age of eleven. He spent a period living with his uncle in Gairfean, Ros Muc, Connemara. The area is in the Gaeltacht (Irish-speaking area) and Ó Conaire learned to speak Irish fluently.

He emigrated to London in 1899 where he got a job with the Board of Education. He became involved in the work of the Gaelic League. A pioneer in the Gaelic revival in the last century, Ó Conaire and Pádraig Pearse are regarded as being the two most important Irish language short story writers during the first decades of the 20th century.

He was married to Molly Ní Mhanais, with whom he had four children: Eileen (born 22 February 1905), Patrick (born 3 November 1906), Kathleen (born 24 February 1909), and Mary Josephine (28 July 1911 – 1922) who died of diphtheria.

Ó Conaire returned to Ireland in 1914, leaving his family in London. Living mostly in Galway, he earned a meagre living through writing, teaching at Gaeltacht summer schools, and as an occasional organiser for the Gaelic League.

He died on a visit to Dublin in 1928 after complaining of internal pains while at the head office of the Gaelic League. He was 46. He is buried in Bohermore Cemetery, Galway.

His fellow poet Frederick Robert Higgins wrote a celebrated Lament for Pádraic Ó Conaire.

He has family still living to this day in England, as well as in Galway and Canada. The Ó Conaire surname is still strong in the Ros Muc area.

=== Inspiration for Internet satire ===
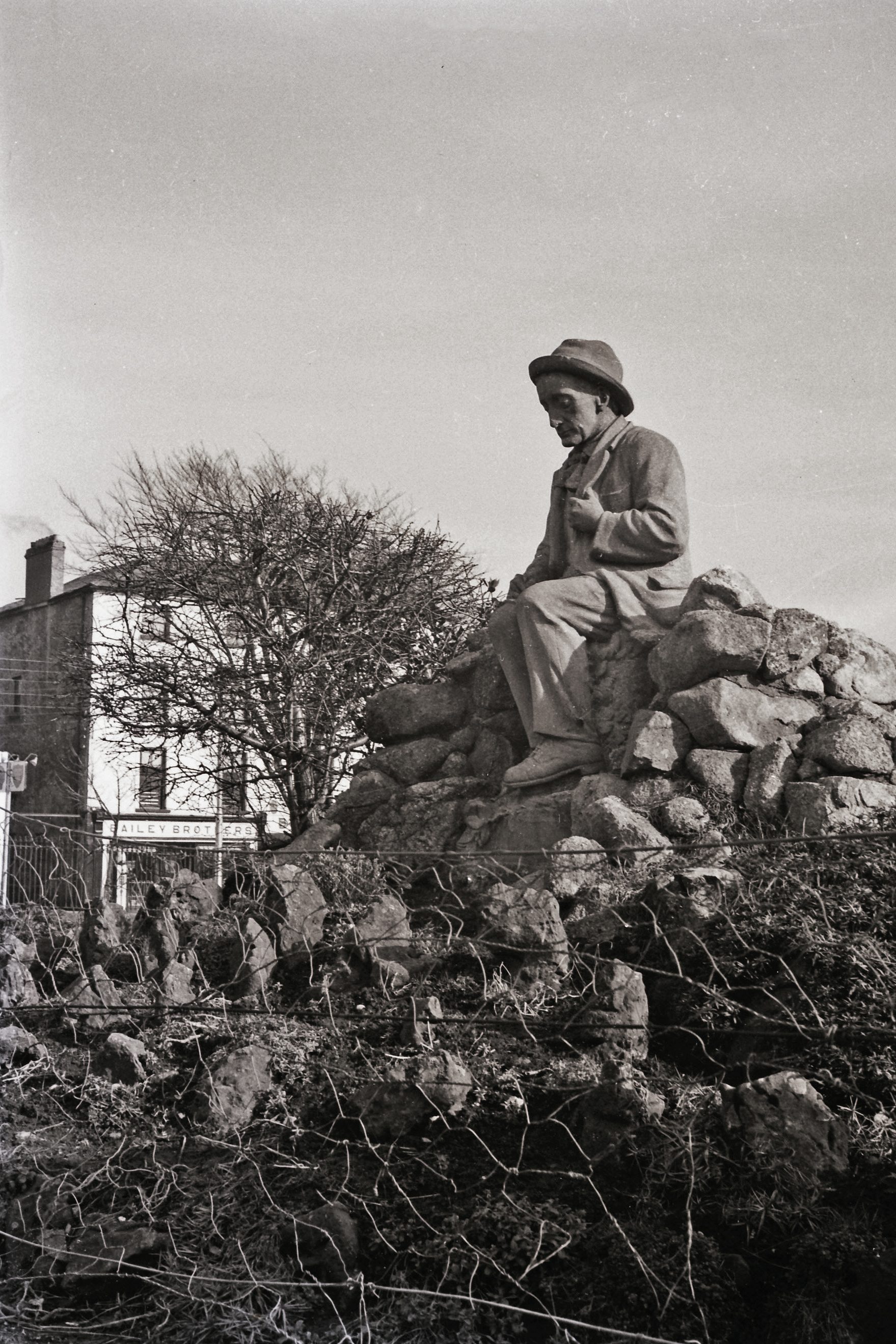
Statue of Pádraic Ó Conaire that stood in Eyre Square, Galway. Now in Galway City Museum

Ó Conaire's short story M'asal Beag Dubh was the inspiration for an Internet-based satire on the football transfer market. The fictitious character Masal Bugduv was created. The name sounds similar to the Irish pronunciation of M'asal Beag Dubh. Journalists who did not fact-check quite as thoroughly as they should have missed the satire and told the world of the up-and-coming Moldovan star.

=== Statue ===
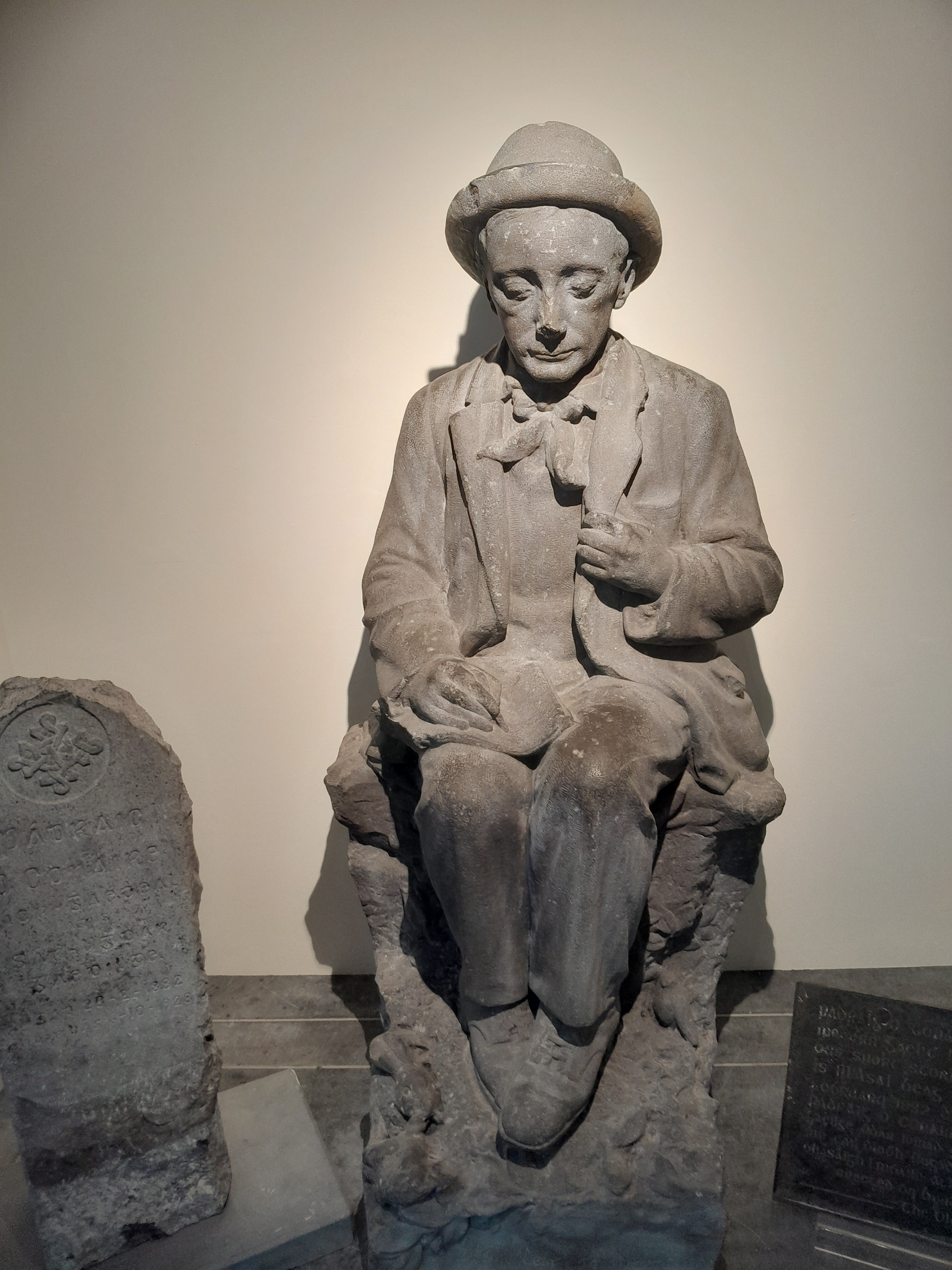
Statue of Pádraic Ó Conaire at the Galway City Museum.

A statue of Ó Conaire was made by Albert Power and unveiled in 1935 by Éamon de Valera in Eyre Square in the heart of Galway City. It was popular with tourists until it was decapitated by four men in 1999. It was repaired at a cost of £50,000 and moved to Galway City Museum in 2004. A bronze replica of the statue was unveiled in Eyre Square in November 2017.

== List of writings ==
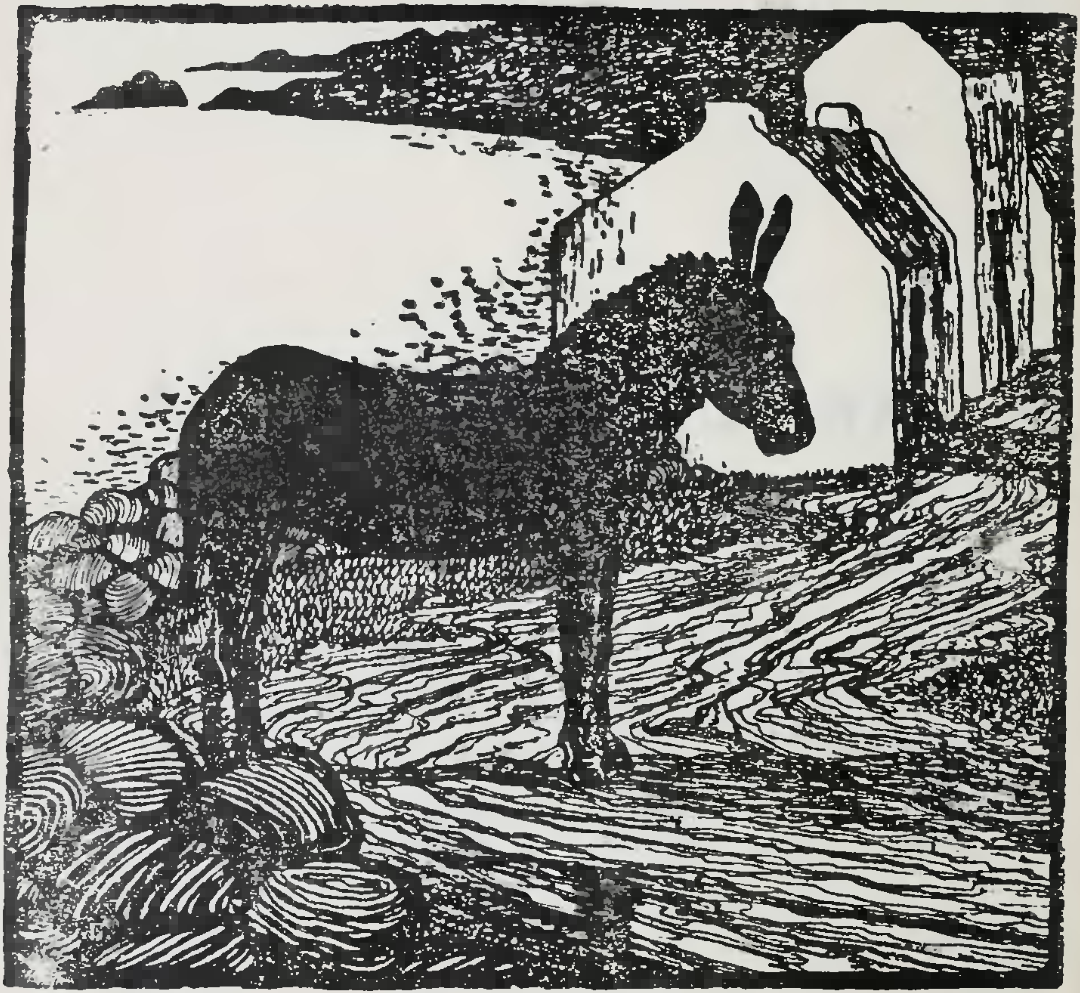
Illustration of M'Asal Beag Dubh from An Crann Géagach

The following is a selection of Ó Conaire's notable works which have been republished, have won awards, been translated, or gained attention in the national press.

=== Novels ===
- Deoraíocht, 1910
- Fearfeasa Mac Feasa

=== Short stories ===
- An Crann Géagach – a collection of 13 short stories, including:
  - M'asal Beag Dubh
- Rogha Scéalta, published in 2008 by CIC, a collection of 21 short stories, also including M'asal Beag Dubh
  - Cuireadh
  - M'asal Beag Dubh
  - An Comhrac
  - Ceol an Uafáis
  - Nóra Mharcais Bhig, 1906
  - Na Gaiscígh
  - An tÁdh
  - An Chéad Chloch, 1914
  - Aba-Cána-Lú!
  - Ná Lig Sinn i gCathú
  - Reggie
  - Misneach
  - An Gníomh
  - Crógacht
  - An Rua ina Údar
  - Trucail an Lóin
  - Neill
  - An Bhean a Ciapadh
  - An Ceol agaus an Chuimhne I
  - Cnoc mo Chroí
  - Slán Agaibh, a Chairde!
- Scothscéalta, a collection containing:
  - Teatrarc na Gaililí
  - Beirt Bhan Misniúil
  - Ná Lig Sinn i gCathú
  - An Bhean ar Leag Dia Lámh Uirthi
  - Anam An Easpaig
  - Nóra Mharcais Bhig
  - Neill
  - An Bhean a Ciapadh
  - Páidín Mháire
  - M'Fhile Caol Dubh

A collection translated into English was published as The Finest Stories of Padraic O Conaire, in 1982. The collection includes all the stories from Scothscéalta plus a few more. Some editions contain 15 stories, others contain 16, the additional story being The Bishop's Soul translated to English by Breandán Ó hEithir.

== See also ==
- List of people on the postage stamps of Ireland
- Dónall Mac Amhlaigh
- Katherine Hughes (activist)
- Masal Bugduv
