= Bohermore Cemetery =

Cemetery in Bohermore, Galway, Ireland

- Interactive map of Bohermore Cemetery

Details
- Established: 1880 (146 years ago)
- Location: Bohermore, Galway
- Country: Ireland
- Coordinates: 53.2812°N 9.0384°W
- Owned by: Galway City Council
- Find a Grave: Bohermore Cemetery

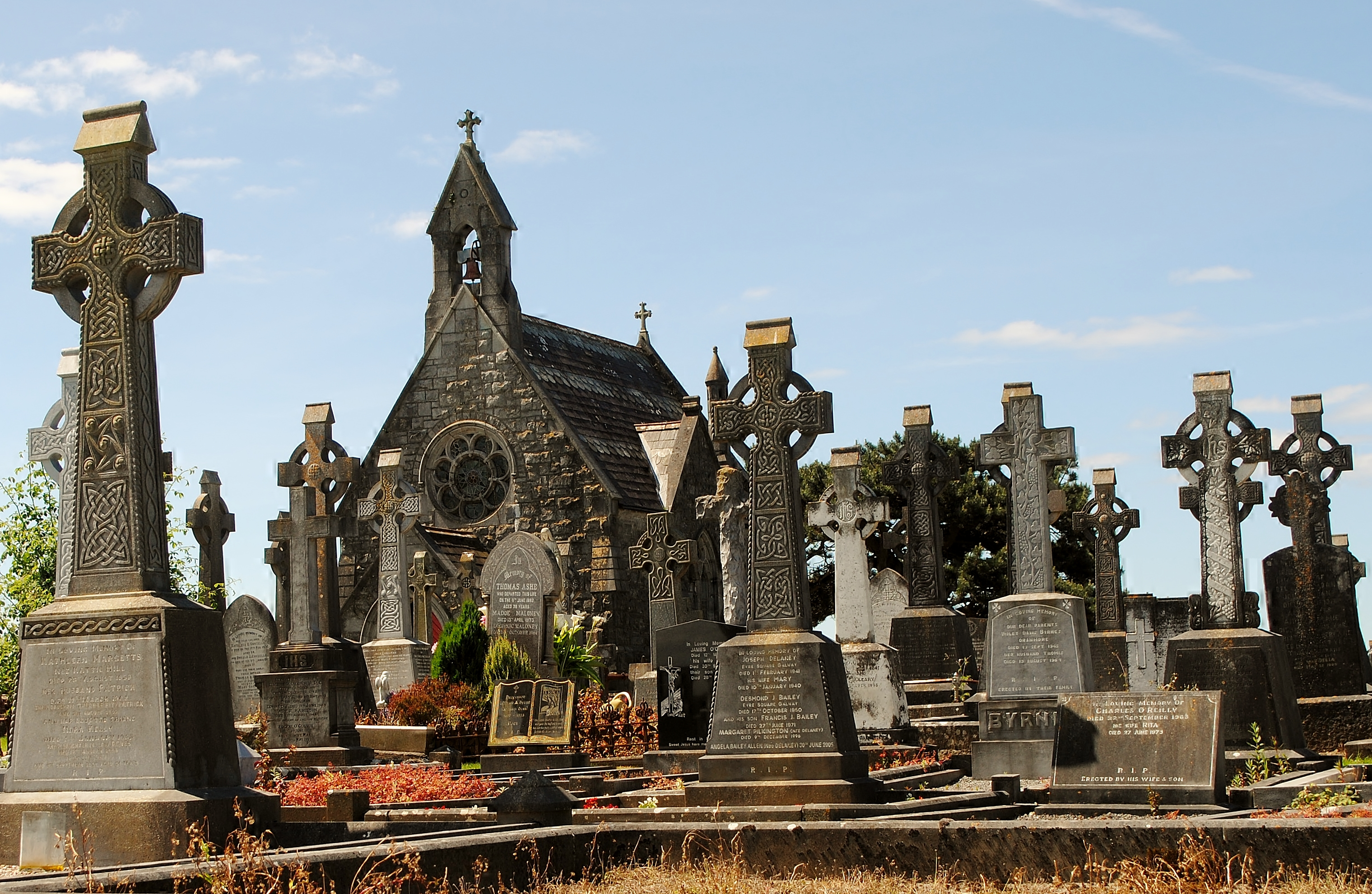
Bohermore Cemetery

Bohermore Cemetery (also known as New Cemetery) is a large cemetery located in Bohermore, an area of Galway, Ireland.

== Location ==
The New Cemetery, as it is more popularly known in Galway, was opened in 1880. It contains two mortuary chapels, one Catholic and the other Protestant. It is one of two cemeteries operated by Galway City Council, the other being Mount St. Joseph Cemetery (also known as Rahoon Cemetery). The Commonwealth War Graves Commission cares for 17 British Commonwealth service personnel graves from the First World War and for 3 from the Second World War. A memorial to the 99 people who died on 14 August 1958 when Dutch aeroplane KLM Flight 607-E crashed into the sea 180 km (112 mi) west of Galway is located just inside the main gates. Several bodies of the passengers are buried around the memorial.

== Notable burials ==
People buried here include:

- Pádraic Ó Conaire (1882–1928), Irish language author and journalist
- Lady Gregory (1852–1932), founding member of the Irish Literary Theatre
- William Joyce (1906–1946, known as Lord Haw-Haw), Irish-American Nazi propagandist, executed for treason
- Michael Morris, 1st Baron Killanin (1826–1901), lawyer and judge
- Michael Morris, 3rd Baron Killanin (1914–1999), president of the International Olympic Committee
- Victims of the KLM Flight 607-E disaster (1958)

== Gallery ==
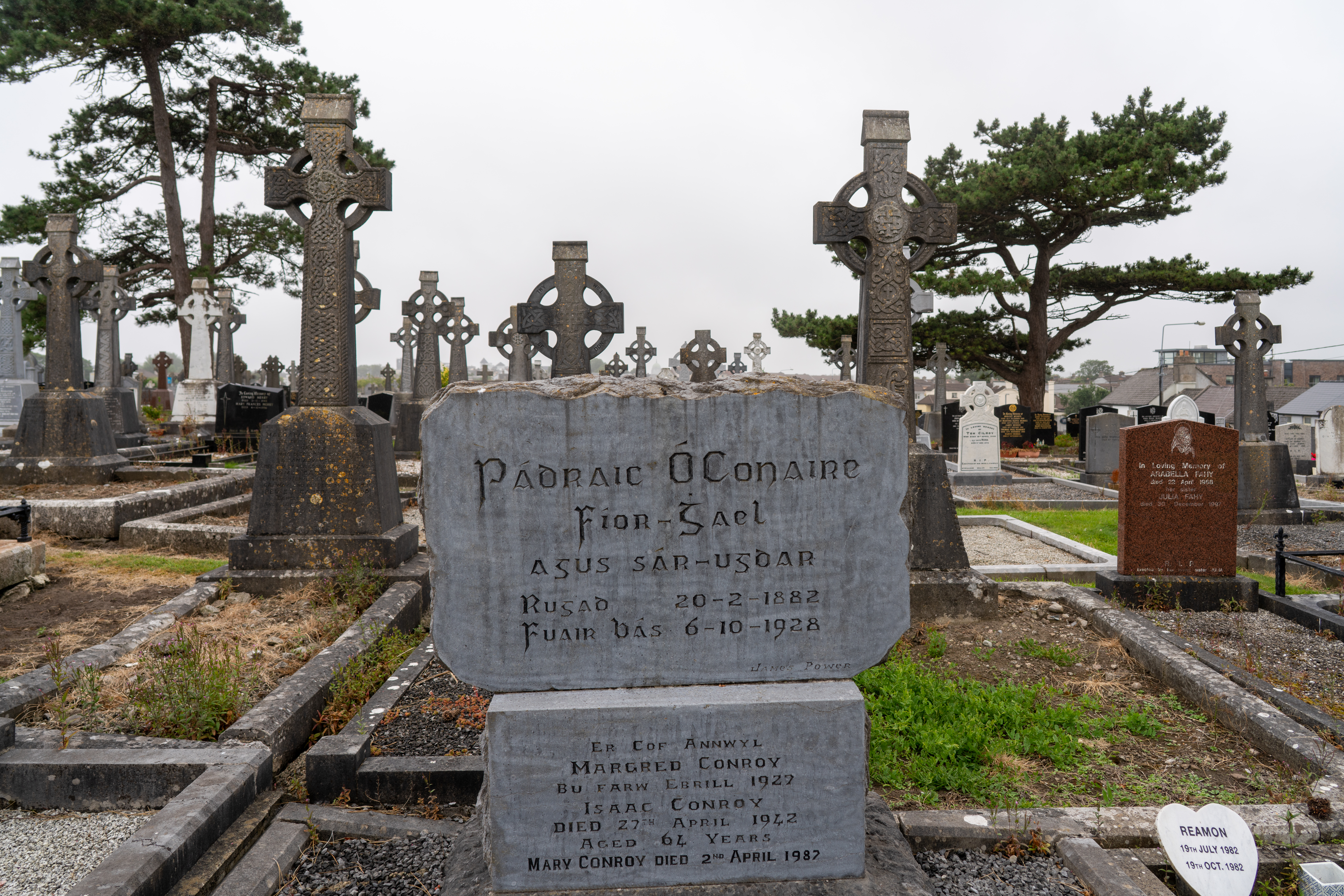
Grave of Pádraic Ó Conaire

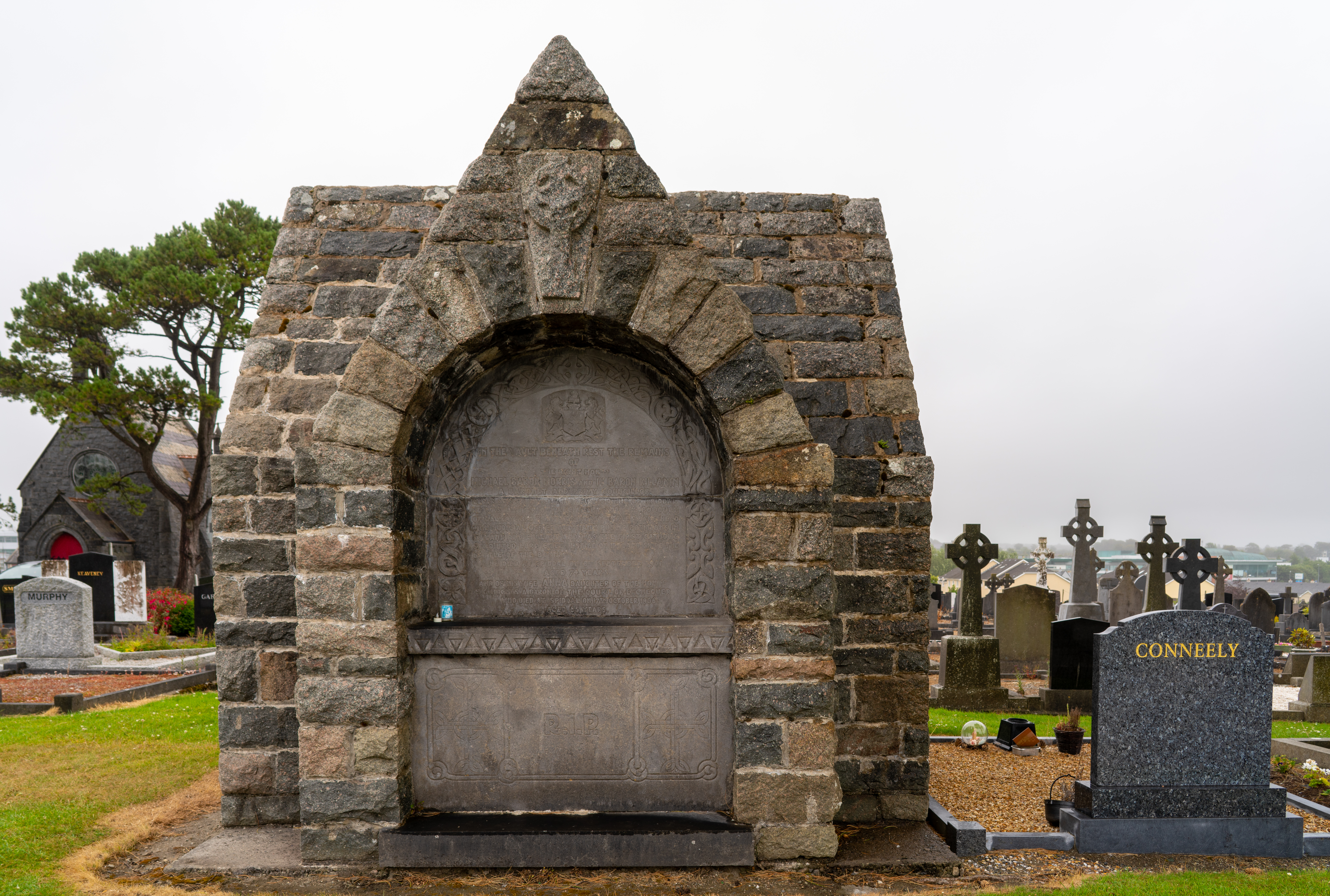
Family vault of Michael Morris, 1st Baron Killanin

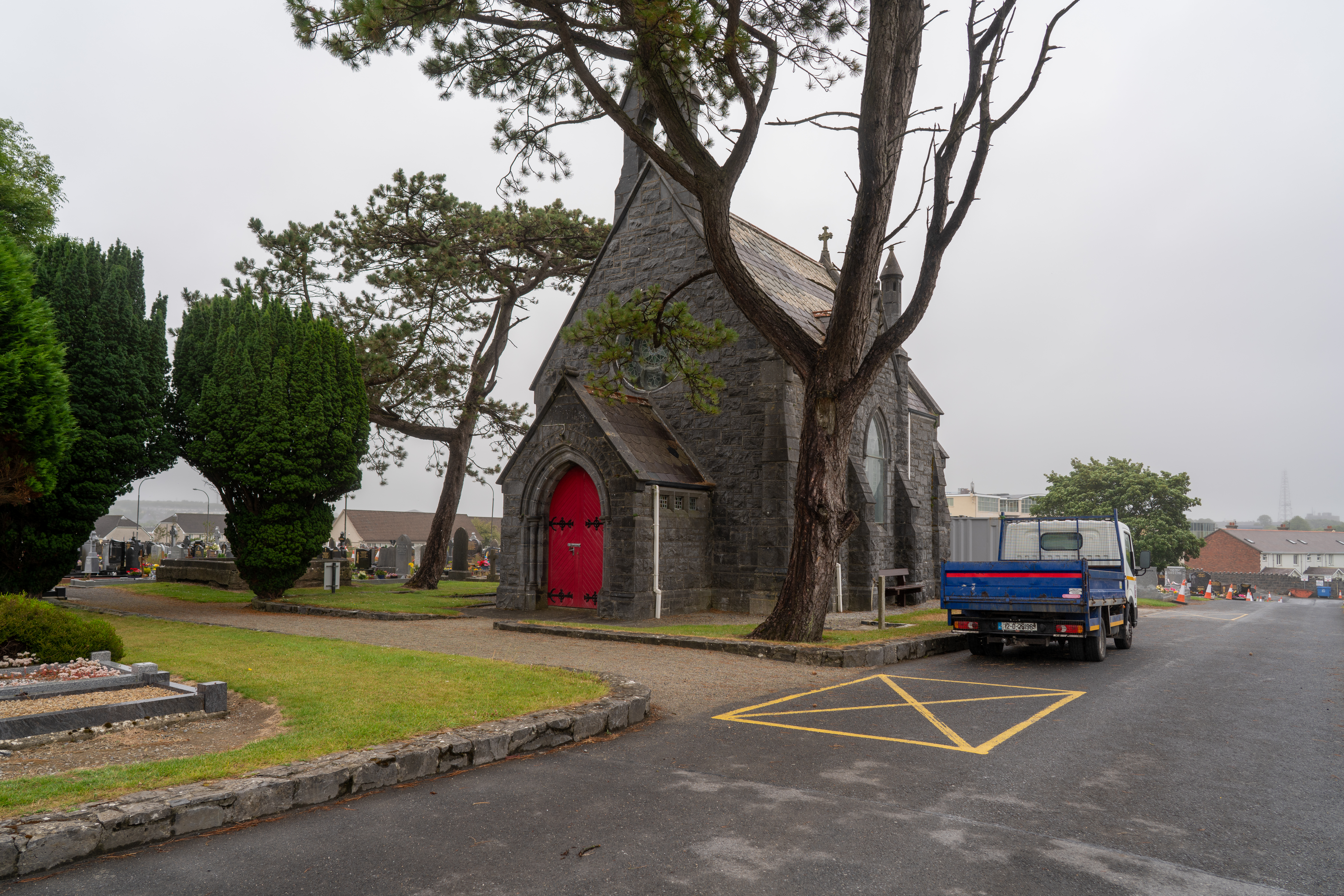
Mortuary chapel

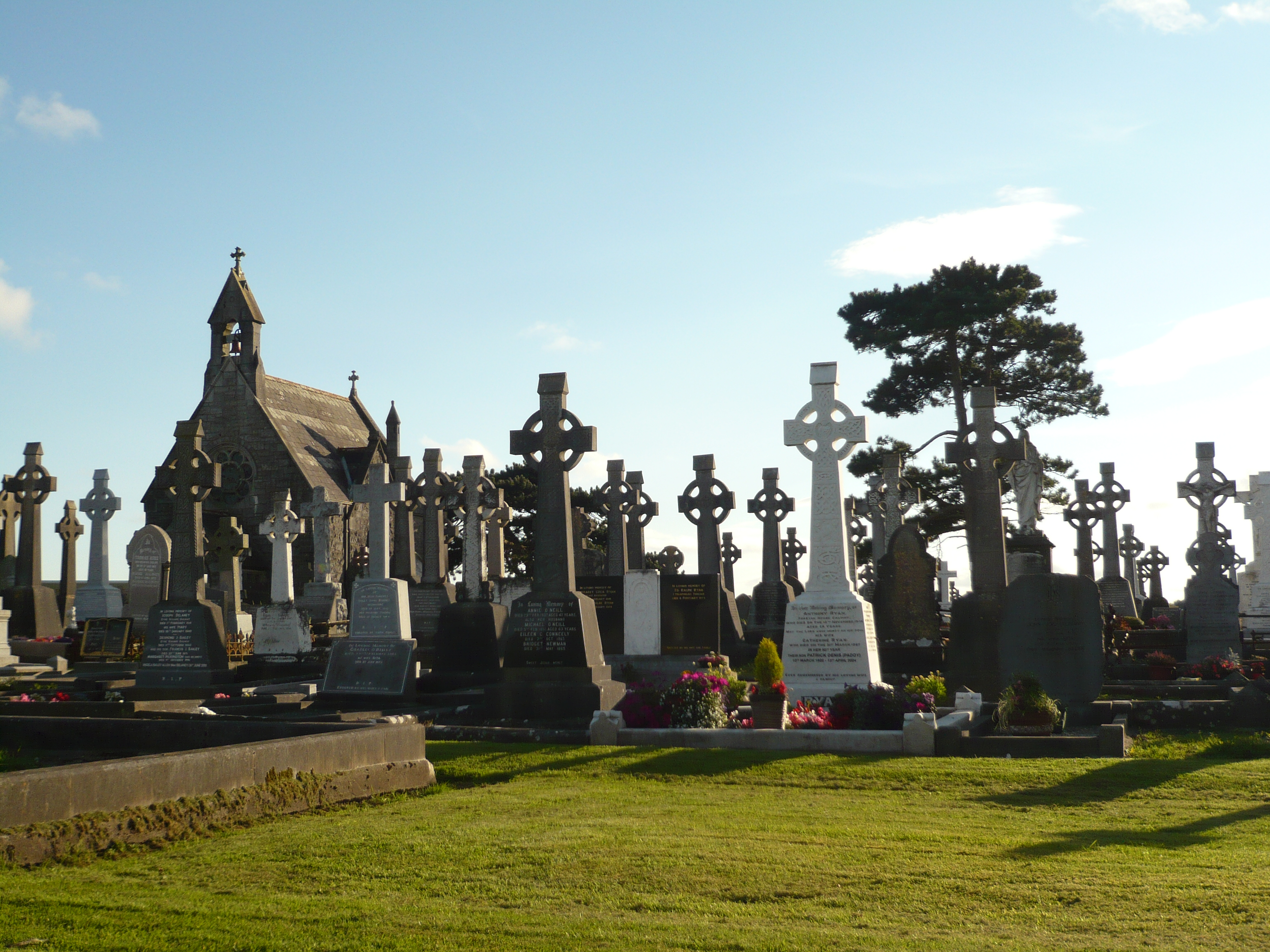
Mortuary chapel and graves

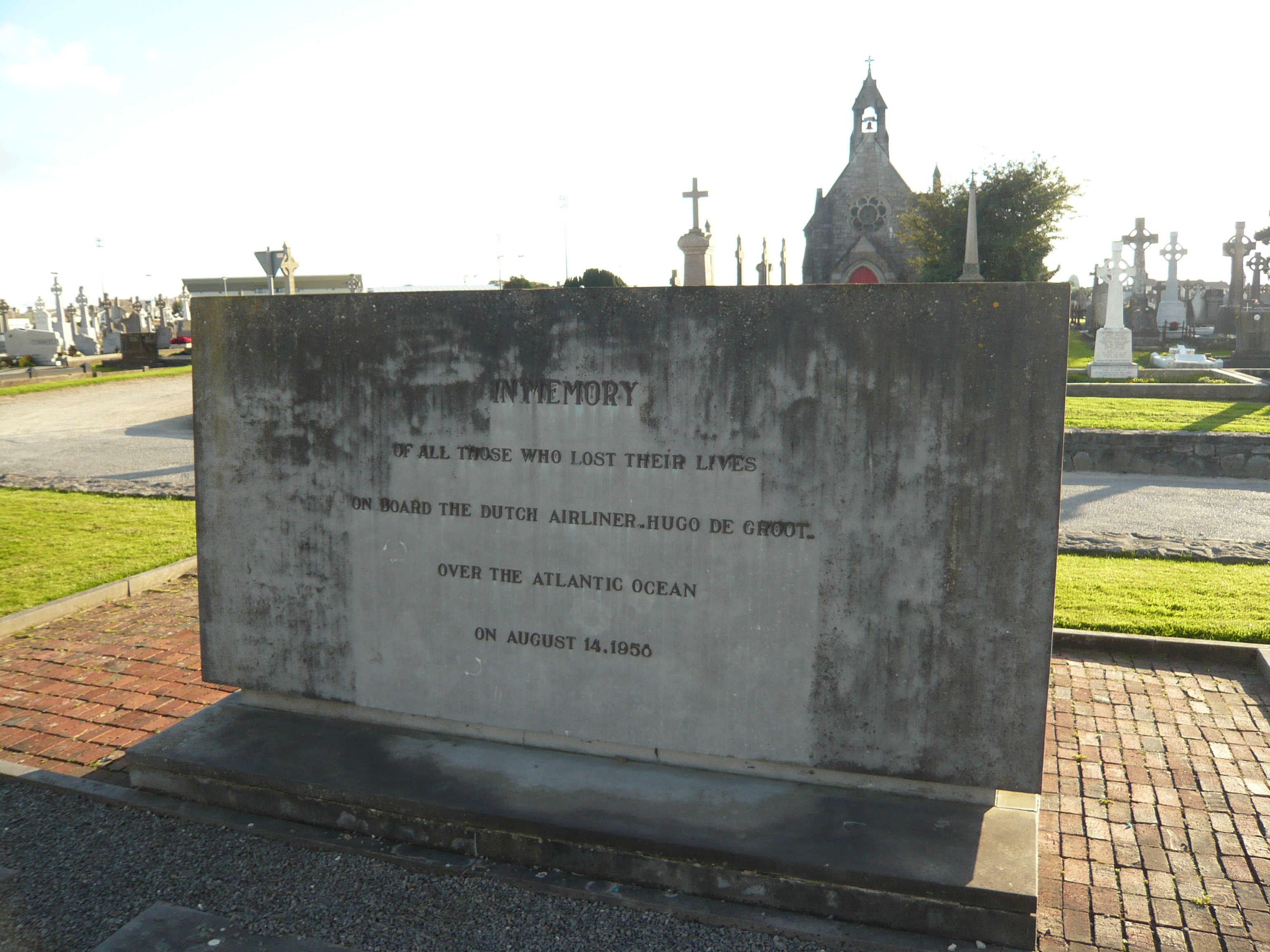
KLM Flight 607-E disaster memorial

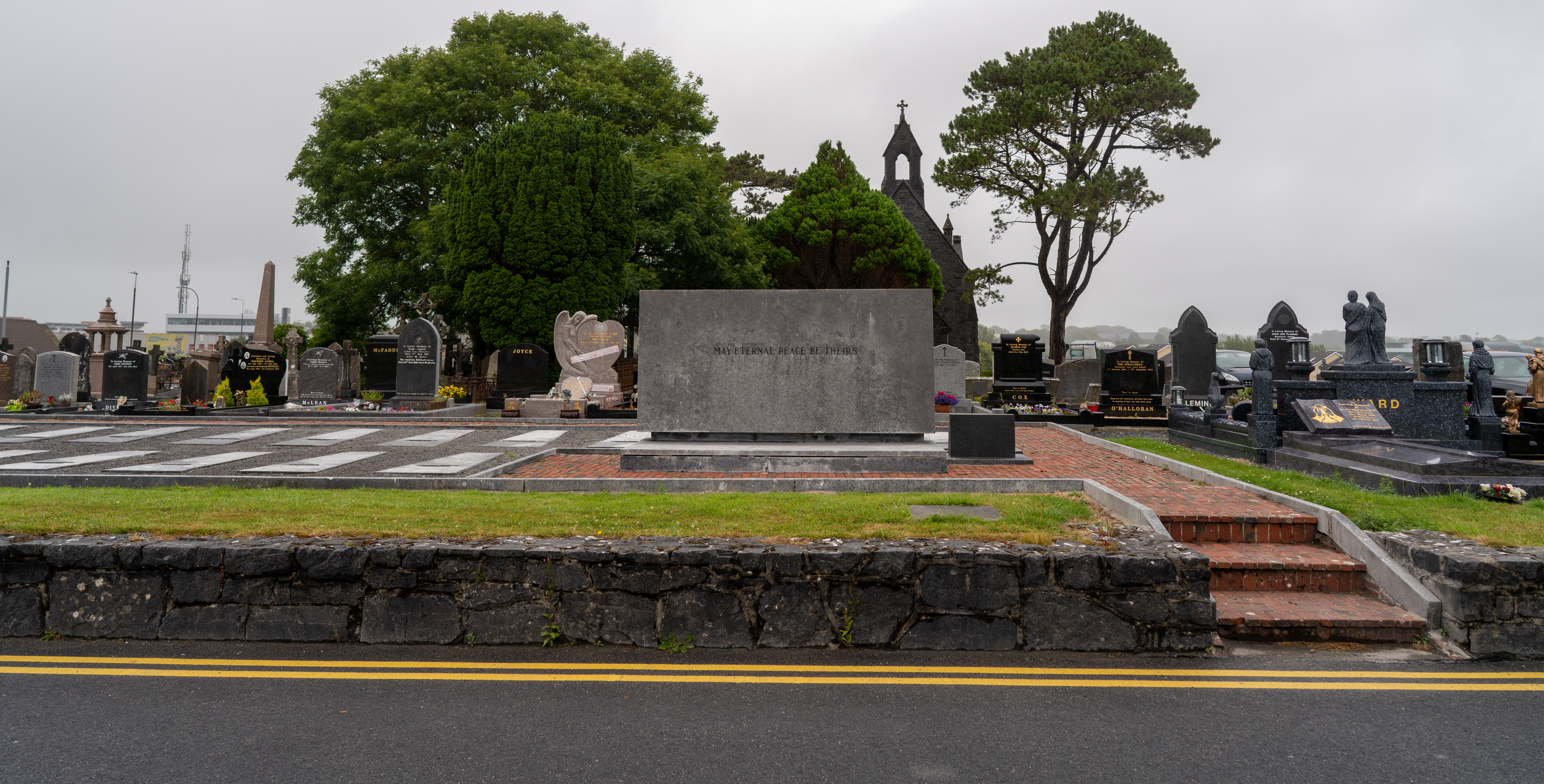
KLM Flight 607-E memorial and graves

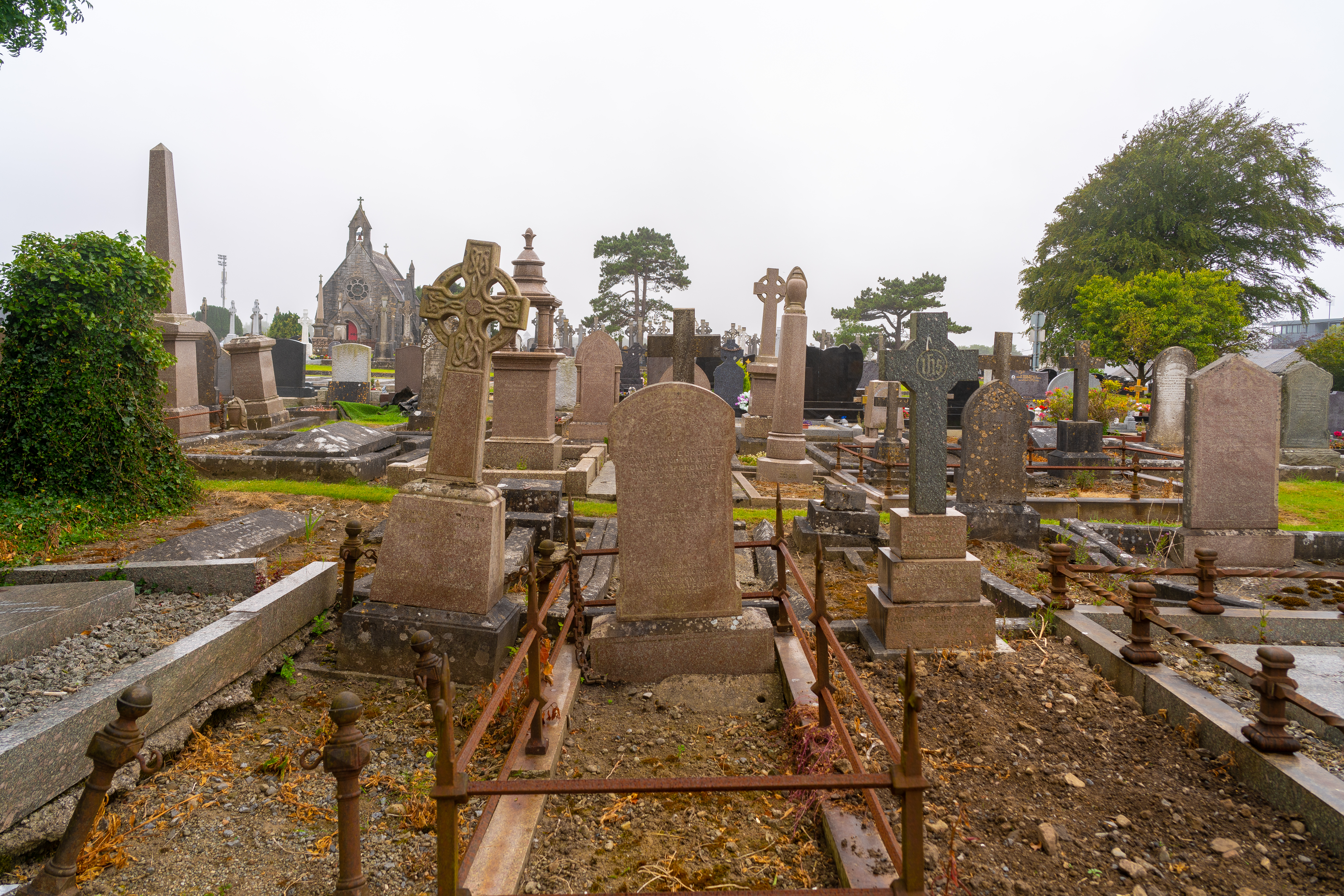
Graves in the cemetery

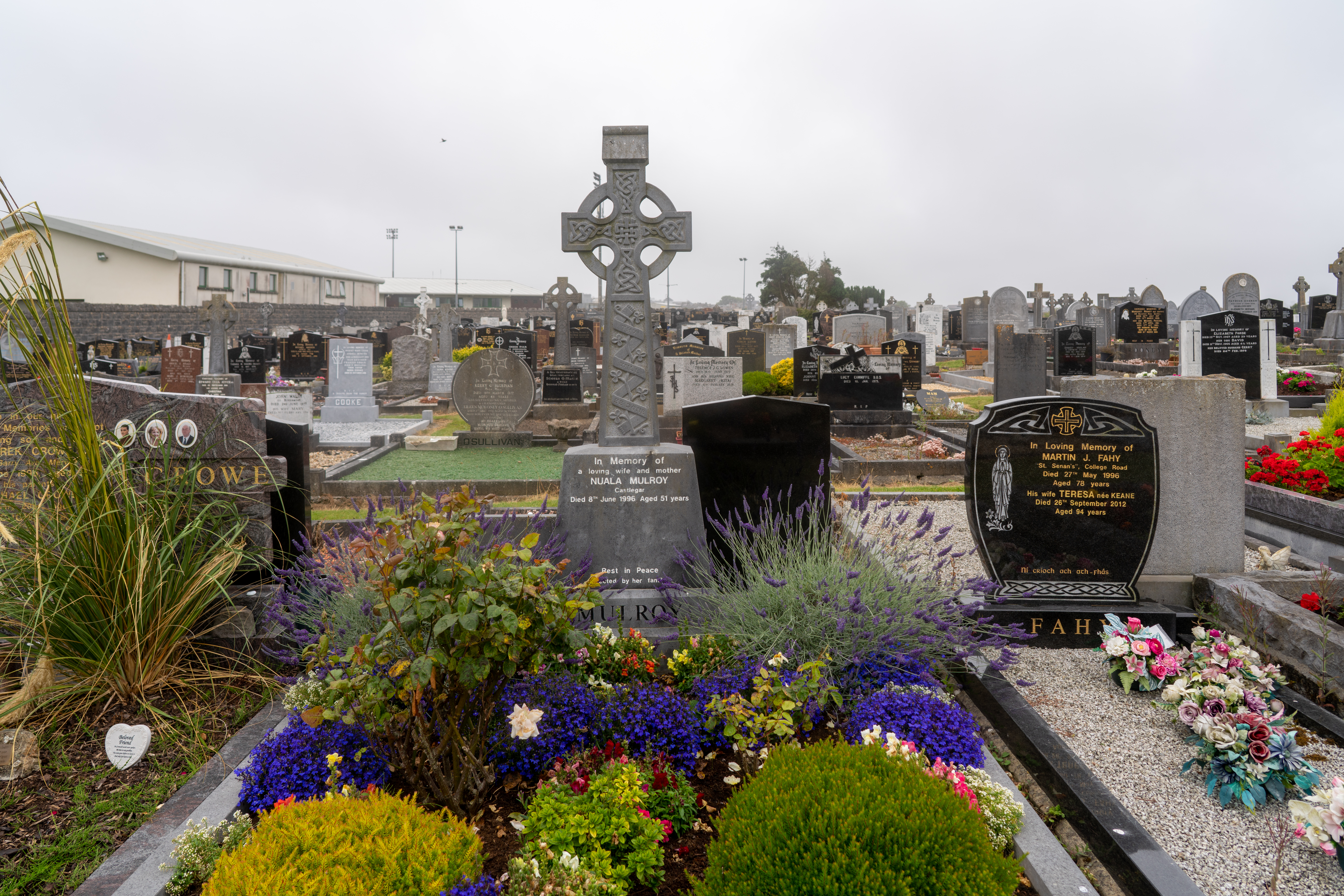
Graves in the cemetery
