= Martin Morris, 2nd Baron Killanin =

Irish politician

The Right Honourable The Lord Killanin PC (Ire)
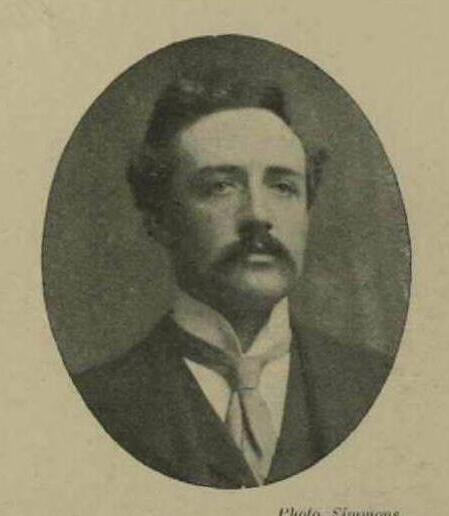

Member of Parliament
- In office 1900–1901
- Constituency: Galway Borough

Personal details
- Born: 22 July 1867
- Died: 11 August 1927 (aged 60)
- Party: Irish Unionist Party
- Parent: Michael Morris (father)

Martin Henry FitzPatrick Morris, 2nd Baron Killanin, PC (Ire) (22 July 1867 – 11 August 1927) was an Irish Unionist (Conservative) Member of Parliament (MP).

== Background and education ==
Morris was the eldest son of Michael Morris, 1st Baron Killanin, Lord Chief Justice of Ireland, and was educated at Trinity College, Dublin, where he was secretary of the University Philosophical Society. He later became a barrister.

== Political career ==
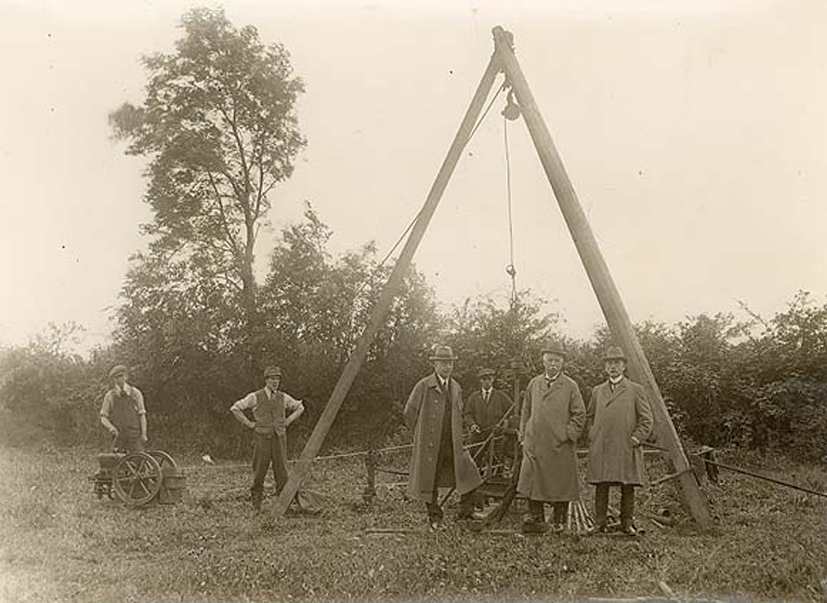
Lord Killanin (centre) as director of the Liffey Power Syndicate inspecting boring operations at Poulaphouca, County Wicklow, as part of a hydro-electric development initiative, 18 August 1923

Morris was appointed High Sheriff of County Galway for 1897.

He was elected to the House of Commons for Galway Borough in 1900, a seat he held until the following year when he succeeded his father as second Baron Killanin and entered the House of Lords.

Lord Killanin was also a member of the Senate of the Royal University of Ireland from 1904 to 1909, Governor of University College, Galway from 1909 to 1922, and served as Lord Lieutenant of County Galway between 1918 and 1922. He was appointed to the Privy Council of Ireland in the 1920 New Year Honours following his chairmanship of the Committee on Irish Primary Education. He was awarded the Knight of Grace of Order of St. John of Jerusalem in England

== Personal life ==
Lord Killanin died on 11 August 1927, aged 60. He never married and was succeeded by his nephew Michael Morris, 3rd Baron Killanin.

== Arms ==
Coat of arms of Martin Morris, 2nd Baron Killanin
Crest On a fasces Proper a lion’s head erased Argent gutté de sang. Escutcheon Ermine a fess indented Sable in base a lion rampant of the last armed and langued Gules. Motto Si Deus Nobiscum Quis Contra Nos

== See also ==
- List of United Kingdom MPs with the shortest service

== Footnotes ==
Parliament of the United Kingdom
Preceded by John Pinkerton	Member of Parliament for Galway Borough; 1900 – 1901	Succeeded by Arthur Lynch
Honorary titles
Preceded by The Lord Clonbrock	Lord Lieutenant of Galway; 1918 – 1922	Office abolished
Peerage of the United Kingdom
Preceded by Michael Morris	Baron Killanin; 1901 – 1927	Succeeded by Michael Morris
