= Romans 8 =

Eighth chapter of the Epistle to the Romans

- ← chapter 7 chapter 9 →
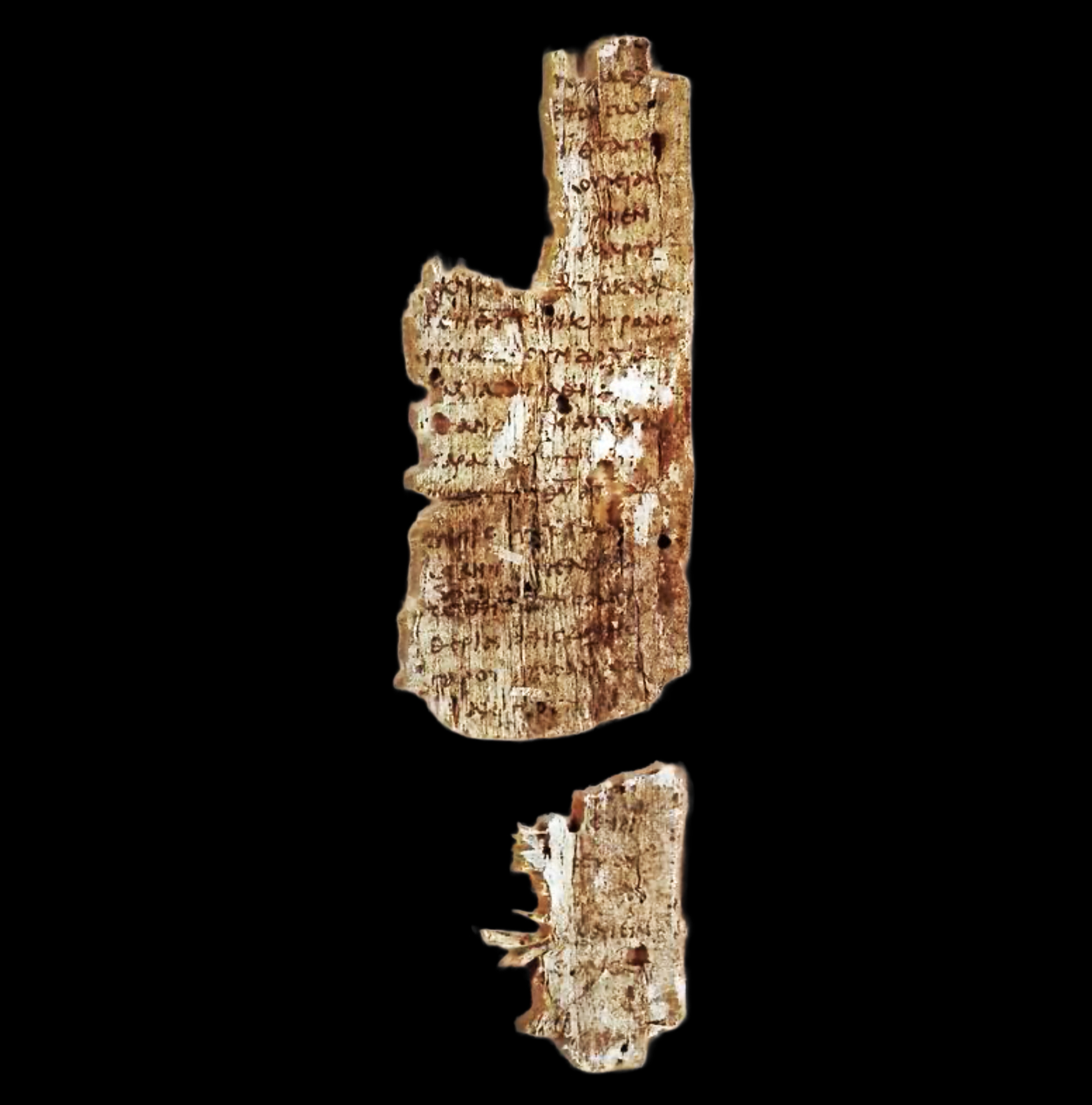
- Epistle to the Romans 8:12–27 in the bigger of two fragments forming Papyrus 27 (recto side), written in the 3rd century
- Book: Epistle to the Romans
- Category: Pauline epistles
- Christian Bible part: New Testament
- Order in the Christian part: 6

Romans 8 is the eighth chapter of the Epistle to the Romans in the New Testament of the Christian Bible. It was authored by Paul the Apostle, while he was in Corinth in the mid-50s AD, with the help of an amanuensis (secretary), Tertius, who added his own greeting in Romans 16:22.

Chapter 8 concerns "the Christian's spiritual life". (Note: According to the Jerusalem Bible's sub-heading for Romans 8) The reformer Martin Luther stated that this chapter is where Paul comforts "spiritual fighters" who are involved in an inner struggle between spirit and flesh:

The Holy Spirit assures us that we are God's children no matter how furiously sin may rage within us, so long as we follow the Spirit and struggle against sin in order to kill it.

== Text ==
The original text was written in Koine Greek. This chapter is divided into 39 verses.

=== Textual witnesses ===
Some early manuscripts containing the text of this chapter are:

- Papyrus 27 (3rd century; extant verses 12–22, 24–27)
- Codex Vaticanus (325–350)
- Codex Sinaiticus (330–360)
- Codex Alexandrinus (400–440)
- Codex Ephraemi Rescriptus (~450; complete)

=== Old Testament references ===
- Romans 8:36 references Psalm 44:22

=== New Testament references ===
- Romans 8:23 references Luke 21:28

== The Spirit of life (verses 1–13) ==
This section of Paul's letter deals with the Christian's deliverance from condemnation, which is the penalty of death because of the sin people are living under, by virtue of the believer's union with Christ.

=== Verse 1 ===
There is therefore now no condemnation to them which are in Christ Jesus, who walk not after the flesh, but after the Spirit.

— Romans 8:1, King James Version

The discourse in the previous chapter continues in Romans 8:1 with the illative word ἄρα, ara, generally translated as 'so' or 'therefore', or 'consequently' in Thayer's Greek Lexicon. The vocabulary and the content of verse 1 point back to the end of chapter 5 as the basis of the conclusion which Paul starts with 'therefore'. Paul argues that Christians are set free from the condemnation (katakrima, cf. verses 16 and 18) caused by Adam because they have been joined to Jesus Christ. In Douglas Moo's analysis, Paul resumes his teaching after a digression in chapters 6–7, while Methodist founder John Wesley suggests that Paul "resumes the thread of his discourse" from Romans 7:1–7, following a digression in Romans 7:8–25 regarding sin and the Mosaic Law:

By dying to what once bound us, we have been released from the law so that we serve in the new way of the Spirit

— Romans 7:7

Theologians Heinrich Meyer and Harold Buls are content to link the inference with the immediately preceding text:

αυτος εγω τω μεν νοι δουλευω νομω θεου τη δε σαρκι νομω αμαρτιας

Translation:

I myself serve the law of God, but with the flesh the law of sin

Buls explains that Paul's "real self" serving God is his mind and not his flesh. Meyer goes on to distinguish between two alternative readings of "There is [...] now no condemnation to those who are in Christ Jesus":

- "now, after Christ [as deliverer from the law of sin, Romans 8:2], has interposed, there is no condemnation ..." or
- "one must be in Christ, in order to get rid of every condemnation".

He prefers the former reading "as a matter of fact that has become historical" rather than the latter reading, attributed to Lutheran theologian Johann Hofmann.

=== Verses 4-11 ===
In order that the righteous requirement of the law might be fulfilled in us, who walk not according to the flesh but according to the Spirit.

The Greek refers to το δικαιωμα του νομου (to dikaiōma tou nomou, the righteous requirement of the law) in the singular to emphasise that the law's multiple requirements "are essentially a unity". Paul goes on to speak of the Holy Spirit as "the Spirit of God", "the Spirit of Christ", and "the Spirit of him who raised Jesus from the dead".

== The Spirit of adoption (verses 14–17) ==
Continuing the theme of 'life' in verses 1–13, the following paragraph (verses 14–17) deals with 'sonship', describing "the wonderful and comforting truth that Christians have been adopted into God's own family, so God's Spirit can confer life on us (13–14) and we can be heirs with a glorious prospect for the future (17–18)". Thus, this short passage provides a transition between the previous and the next part.

== The Spirit of glory (verses 18–30) ==
In verses 18–30, Paul further develops his whole theme of Christian assurance, which he started in chapter 5, elaborating on the Christian's hope of glory, based on the knowledge that "God has determined to bring us though to our inheritance" (18–22, 29–30), providentially working on behalf of his children (verse 28) and having given his Spirit as the guarantee for their final redemption (verse 30).

=== Verse 28 ===
And we know that all things work together for good to them that love God, to them who are the called according to his purpose.

— Romans 8:28–28, King James Version

Verse 28 can be seen in the context of verses 29–30 (and in larger context: verses 18–39) that "those who love God" are not promised to only experience good things, but would also suffer the woes and persecution of the present age, yet God can use all these to his divine purpose, and he has everything under control.

=== Verse 29 ===
For whom he did foreknow, he also did predestinate to be conformed to the image of his Son, that he might be the firstborn among many brethren.

— Romans 8:29, King James Version

- "Image" (Greek: eikon; 'icon') alludes to the account of creation of humankind in Genesis 1:26, indicating that the believers will share the character of Christ.

=== Verse 30 ===
Moreover whom he did predestinate, them he also called: and whom he called, them he also justified: and whom he justified, them he also glorified.

— Romans 8:30, King James Version

- "Justified": as in Romans 1:16, 'justification' here in a combination of two ideas: (1) that "God credits to believers the status of righteousness" and (2) that "God empowers believers to live righteously"; both are stated in verse 29 (God's purpose that believers "be conformed to the image of his Son"), so the believers will share the future glory (being one "within a large family"; verse 30, cf. 1 Corinthians 15:20).

== God's everlasting love (verses 31–39) ==
Anglican Bishop Charles Ellicott describes the final section of chapter 8 (verses 31–39) as "a sublime and triumphant conclusion", and Erasmus of Rotterdam remarks that "Cicero never said anything grander".

=== Verse 31 ===
What shall we then say to these things? If God be for us, who can be against us?

— Romans 8:31, King James Version

Greek New Testament:

τί οὖν ἐροῦμεν πρὸς ταῦτα, Ti oun eroumen pros tauta εἰ ὁ θεὸς ὑπὲρ ἡμῶν τίς καθ' ἡμῶν, ei ho Theos hyper hēmōn tis kath' hēmōn

- "These things" (Greek: tauta): The Living Bible translates as 'these wonderful things'. By "these things", according to William Reed Newell, "Paul evidently indicates not only the whole process of our salvation by Christ, from chapter three onward, with that great deliverance by the help of the Holy Spirit set forth in this eighth chapter [...] but also [...] what he has been telling us of the purpose of God: "Whom He foreknew, foreordained, called, justified, glorified!"

"If God be for us, who can be against us?" (Si Deus nobiscum, quis contra nos?) became widespread as a motto. It is an aria for Soprano in Handel's Messiah (1741).

=== Verse 32 ===
He that spared not his own Son, but delivered him up for us all, how shall he not with him also freely give us all things?

— Romans 8:32, King James Version

- "Spared": translated from the Greek word ἐφείσατο, epheisato. Hill regards this verse 32 "especially poignant* as it borrows the language from the account of the binding of Isaac in Genesis 22 (Genesis 22:12: "you have not withheld your son, your only son"; the Greek Septuagint renders 'withheld" as ἐφείσω, epheiso), but God made the sacrifice, that even Abraham was spared.

=== Verse 35 ===
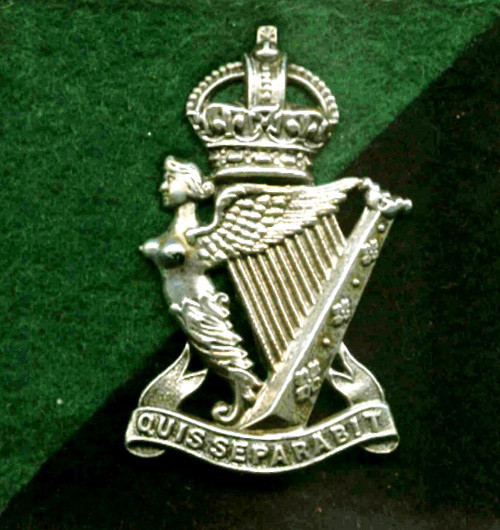
The text "Quis separabit" on the cap badge of the Royal Ulster Rifles

Who shall separate us from the love of Christ? shall tribulation, or distress, or persecution, or famine, or nakedness, or peril, or sword?

— Romans 8:35, King James Version

The first part of verse 35, either in its full form (Latin: Quis ergo nos separabit a caritate Christi?) or shortened as Quis separabit?, is often used as a motto. The list of "hardship (KJV: 'tribulation') [...] or sword" recalls the real afflictions that the people of Israel experienced in history, as summarized in the quote in verse 36.

=== Verse 36 ===
As it is written: "For your sake we face death all day long; we are considered as sheep to be slaughtered."

— Romans 8:36, New International Version

The citation from Psalm 44:22 in Greek is exactly as in the Septuagint (numbered as Psalm 43:22).

== More than conquerors ==
=== Verse 37 ===
Nay, in all these things we are more than conquerors through him that loved us.

— Romans 8:37, King James Version

- "We are more than conquerors" translated from a single Greek word ὑπερνικῶμεν, hypernikōmen, a word probably coined by Paul himself, "who loves compounds with ὑπέρ, hyper". The Vulgate renders it in Latin as superamus, but Cyprian supervincimus. Later Greek writers distinguish νικᾶν, nikan and ὑπερνικᾶν, hypernikan, and justify the current rendering. To define in what the "more" consists, the answer must be sought on the line indicated in the note on ἕνεκεν σοῦ, eneken sou, 'for your sake' in verse 36, that is, these trials not only do not cut the believers off from Christ's love, but actually give them "more intimate and thrilling experiences" from it.

== A hymn to God's love ==
=== Verses 38–39 ===
^{38}For I am persuaded that neither death nor life, nor angels nor principalities nor powers, nor things present nor things to come, ^{39}nor height nor depth, nor any other created thing, shall be able to separate us from the love of God which is in Christ Jesus our Lord.

— Romans 8:38–39, New King James Version

The New Jerusalem Bible suggests that the "principalities", "like 'angels' and 'princes' are among the mysterious cosmic or elemental forces which to the mind of antiquity were in general hostile to humanity. The 'heights' and 'depths' represent Heaven and Hell, also conceived as powers."

== Uses ==
=== Music ===
The King James Version of verse 34 from this chapter is cited as texts in the English-language oratorio "Messiah" by George Frideric Handel (HWV 56). Verse 1–2 and 9–11 are cited as words in some movements of Jesu, meine Freude ("Jesus, my joy"), a motet by Johann Sebastian Bach.

== See also ==
- Binding of Isaac
- Quis separabit?
- Related Bible parts: Genesis 22, Psalm 44, Romans 1, 2 Thessalonians 2

== Sources ==
- Coogan, Michael David (2007). Coogan, Michael David; Brettler, Marc Zvi; Newsom, Carol Ann; Perkins, Pheme (eds.). The New Oxford Annotated Bible with the Apocryphal/Deuterocanonical Books: New Revised Standard Version, Issue 48 (Augmented 3rd ed.). Oxford University Press. ISBN 9780195288810.
- Hill, Craig C. (2007). "64. Romans". In Barton, John; Muddiman, John (eds.). The Oxford Bible Commentary (first (paperback) ed.). Oxford University Press. pp. 1083–1108. ISBN 978-0199277186.
- Moo, Douglas J. (1994). "Romans". In Carson, D. A.; France, R. T.; Motyer, J. A.; Wenham, G. J. (eds.). New Bible Commentary: 21st Century Edition (4, illustrated, reprint, revised ed.). Inter-Varsity Press. pp. 1115–1160. ISBN 9780851106489.
