= Stephen Kirwan =

Irish bishop

- Bishop of Clonfert, Bishop of Kilmacduagh
- Church: Church of Ireland
- Diocese: Clonfert

Orders
- Consecration: 15 April 1573

Personal details
- Died: 1601

Stephen Kirwan (a.k.a. Kerovan and O'Kirwan) was an Irish Anglican bishop. He was the Church of Ireland Bishop of Clonfert from 1582 until before 4 November 1601.

== Life and career ==
Kirwan was a member of the tribes of Galway, previously a Roman Catholic educated in Oxford, Paris and Rome. He became an Anglican in the mid-16th century and was the Archdeacon of Annaghdown from 1558 and the first reformed Church of Ireland Bishop of Kilmacduagh from 13 April 1573. Nominated 30 March 1582 for Clonfert, letters patent were issued 24 May 1582 and he was translated to Clonfert the same year.

Kirwan was involved in local government in Connaught, serving as a justice and commissioner for the province from 1580 until his death.

He died before 4 November 1601. Other members of his family included:

- John William Kirwan
- Augustine Kirwan
- Richard Kirwan
- Sir John Kirwan
- Dominick Kirwin
