= Kirwan =

Kirwan (Irish: Ó/Ní Chiarbháin) may refer to:

== Places ==
- Kirwan, Queensland, suburb in the Australian city of Townsville
- Kairouan, also known as Kirwan, the capital of the Kairouan Governorate in Tunisia

== People ==
- A. D. Kirwan (1904–1971), former professor, administrator, coach and president of the University of Kentucky
- Annette Kirwan (died 1913), Irish noble
- Barry Kirwan (born 1986), Northern Irish country / folk singer, songwriter and drummer
- Carl Kirwan (born 1991), English rugby union player
- Danny Kirwan (1950–2018), guitarist with Fleetwood Mac from 1968 to 1972
- Dervla Kirwan (born 1971), actress
- Edward Kirwan (1814–1890), English clergyman and cricketer
- Eilis Kirwan (born 1972), Irish filmmaker
- Frances Kirwan (born 1959), British mathematician
- James Kerwin (born 1973), Irish-American filmmaker
- John Kirwan (disambiguation), several persons of this name
- Joseph W. Kirwan (1796–1849), Irish clergyman
- Katie Kirwan (1945-1997), conspiracy theorist who went missing in the Appalachian mountains
- Larry Kirwan (born 1954), musician and playwright best known for his work with Black 47
- Laurence A. Kirwan (born 1952), English doctor
- Laurence P. Kirwan (1907–1999), British archaeologist
- Michael J. Kirwan (1886–1970), congressman, Democrat Ohio 1937–1970
- Richard Kirwan of Galway (1733–1812), prominent philosopher and chemist
- Nicholas Murray (Presbyterian) (1802–1861), Irish-American writer, whose pseudonym was Kirwan
- William Burke Kirwan (born 1814), Irish painter and convicted murderer
- William E. "Brit" Kirwan (born 1938), mathematics professor, university administrator, chancellor emeritus of the University System of Maryland
- One of the fourteen Tribes of Galway

== Other uses ==
- Château Kirwan, Bordeaux wine producer, formerly named simply Kirwan
