= William Ó Ciardhubháin =

Irish merchant

William Ó Ciardhubháin, fl. 1488, was an Irish merchant and the founder of one of the Tribes of Galway.

Ó Ciardhubháin is said to have been a native of Dunbally castle, near Dunmore, County Galway. He had a quarrel with Thomas III de Bermingham, Ó Cellaigh of Áth Liag and other local families which forced him and his family to flee to the town of Galway, leaving the de Berminghams to possess their property. A variant tradition states that:

... shortly afterwards he was reinstated in the possession of the castle & lands in consequence of an intermarriage that took place between Thomas Oge Mc Jarvis, his Lordship's fourth son, and Unagh Ní Ciorovane, and that the family remained there until 1625, when the lands were seized (that is, were taken possession of legally) by Richard Bermingham, 14th Lord Athenry, and afterwards vested in his son, Moiler Boy Bermingham of Dunmore. The lands of Dunbally were afterwards confiscated after the victory of Cromwell.

However the means, Ó Ciardhubháin, with his family and followers, are stated in the city archives to have settled in the town in 1488, "where he became one of the principal, influential men then in Galway." John Óge Kirwan became the first member of the family to become Mayor, followed by William's eldest son Thomas in 1534, while the second son, Patrick, became Warden of Galway.

The family, while always acknowledged as of Gaelic origin, eventually rendered their surname from Ó Ciardhubháin to Kirwan. Known descendants of William Ó Ciardhubháin include:

- Joseph W. Kirwan, (1796–24 December 1849) was an Irish clergyman and educationalist
- Annette Kirwan, (Sarah Annette Foster Kirwan; died 6 April 1913) was the first wife of Edward Carson, Baron Carson.
- Magdalen Kirwan, (1830 – February 1906) member of the Sisters of Mercy and manager of Goldenbridge penal refuge
- John William Kirwan, (died 29 December 1849) was the first President of Queen's College, Galway.
- Richard Kirwan, (1 August 1733 – 22 June 1812) was an Irish geologist and chemist
- Rev. Augustine Kirwan, (1724 – 7 August 1791) Kirwan was Warden of Galway and Vicar of St. Nicholas's church
- Sir John Kirwan, (1650–1721) West Indies Merchant Entrepreneur, founder of the Kirwans of Castle Hackett, County Galway.
- Stephen Kirwan
- Dominick Kirwin
