= Skerrett =

Skerrett is a surname. Notable people with the surname include:

- Charles Skerrett KCMG, KC (1863–1929), the fifth Chief Justice of New Zealand from 1926 to 1929
- James Skerrett (fl. 1513 – 1532), Mayor of Galway
- John Skerrett (Augustinian) (c. 1630 – 1688) Galway-born preacher and Missionary
- John Skerrett (mayor), 7th Mayor of Galway, 1491–1492
- John Byrne Skerrett (c. 1778 – 1814), British soldier who fought in the Spanish War of Independence
- Joseph Skerrett, American literary critic and professor of English at the University of Massachusetts Amherst
- Joseph S. Skerrett (1833–1897), American admiral
- Kelvin Skerrett (born 1966), English rugby league footballer
- Maria, Lady Walpole (1702–1738) was the wife of British Prime Minister Robert Walpole
- Marianne Skerrett (1793–1887), the lady's maid of queen Victoria
- Michael Skerrett (died 1785), Irish clergyman of the Roman Catholic Church
- Nicholas Skerrett (died 1583), Galway-born Archbishop of Tuam, 1580–83
- Trevor Skerrett, English rugby league footballer
