= Risteárd Buidhe Kirwan =

Soldier and duellist

Risteárd Buidhe Kirwan (1708–1779) was an Irish soldier and duellist.

== Biography ==
Kirwan was a son of Patrick Kirwan of Cregg and Mary Martin of Dangan. Both towns are in County Galway, and his parents were members of the Tribes of Galway. He was an uncle of the scientist Richard Kirwan, and a cousin of Richard Martin MP, founder of the Society for the Prevention of Cruelty to Animals.

He travelled to France for his education. He joined Dillon's Regiment of the Irish Brigade. He became famed as a swordsman and duellist, and for his stature, which measured six feet four inches in height. Among his closest acquaintances were Lord Clare and Maurice de Saxe. He participated in the Battle of Fontenoy (1745).

His became notorious because of his duelling, and was obliged to leave France. He joined the Austrian service. He retired in 1751 and returned to Ireland. He married Maria Birmingham, a relative of Baron Athenry, and had issue. He was nicknamed Risteárd Buidhe a' chlaidhimh (swarthy Richard of the sword) and Nineteen-duel Dick.

== See also ==
- William Ó Ciardhubháin, family founder, fl. 1488
- Francis Kirwan, Bishop of Killala, 1589–1661
- Dominick Kirwin, Irish Confederate, fl. 1642–1653
- Annette Kirwan, first wife of Edward Carson, Baron Carson, (died 1913)
