= Richard Lynch (Jesuit) =

Irish theologian (1611–1676)

- Born: November 15, 1610; Galway, Kingdom of Ireland
- Died: 18 March 1676 (aged 65); Salamanca, Spain
- Occupation: Theologian

Richard Lynch (15 November 1610 – 18 March 1676) was an Irish theologian and Jesuit.

== Biography ==
Richard Lynch was born in Galway to one of the Tribes of Galway. He was a student at the Irish College at Santiago de Compostela in Spain before entering the Society of Jesus there on 14 September 1626. Having graduated DD he taught theology for many years at Valladolid and at Salamanca, where he enjoyed a high reputation. In 1637 he was made rector of the Irish College in Seville. He died at Salamanca in 1676 having lived most of his life in Spain. He published a three-volume compendium of scholastic philosophy (Lyon, 1654), and a two-volume treatise De Deo ultimo fine (Salamanca, 1671). The library at Salamanca holds many of his theological works in manuscript form, many of which were written in Spanish.

== Bibliography ==
- Universa Philosophia Scholastica, i, ii, iii, Lyons, 1654
- Sermones varios, Salamanca, 1670
- De Deo ultimo fine, i, ii, Salamanca, 1671
- Sermon Panezyrico a la Canonizacion de Francisco de Borja, con circumstancias de la rudificacion de el Colegio de la Compania de Jesus, de Medina del Campo, despeus de su grema, y Jubileo de quarenta horas, Salamanca, 1674.

== See also ==
- John Lynch (Gratianus Lucius)
- Stephen Lynch (Franciscan)
- Peirce Lynch
