= Edmund Ffrench =

Edmund Ffrench, O.P. (1775–1852) was the Roman Catholic Warden of Galway and Bishop of Kilmacduagh and Kilfenora.

Ffrench was a descendant of the Tribes of Galway, though by the 18th century, his family had become Protestant. His father, Edmund, was Mayor of Galway and the town's Protestant Warden. In 1761, as mayor, he signed the notorious "manifesto of intolerance", known as the Black Petition.

Edmund and his brother, Charles, converted to Catholicism at a young age due to the influence of a Catholic servant girl. Charles later become a missionary in America and built the Immaculate Conception Church in Lawrence, Massachusetts (MA), in 1846, the first Catholic church in the city.

In 1794 Ffrench was accepted as a Dominican postulant in the Claddagh priory of Galway. He took the habit at Esker monastery, Athenry; his name in religion was Martin, but it was a name he never used. He studied in the Dominican, College of Corpo Santo, Lisbon where he was ordained in about 1804. From 1806 to 1810 he served at St. Michan's, Dublin.

He was the last Warden of Galway, elected despite being ineligible as a member of a religious order. His term was turbulent. He was criticised for not ending the disputes between the religious orders and the secular clergy. However, he succeeded in bringing the Presentation Sisters to the town and building 'St. Nicholas's parish chapel', later the Pro-Cathedral, on Middle and Lower Abbeygate Streets. The Wardenship was brought to an end in 1831, being absorbed into the new Diocese of Galway. Between 1824 and his death, he also served as Bishop of Kilmacduagh and Kilfenora having been consecrated in 1825.

Ffrench retired to Thornville, Kinvara, where he built around nine churches and supported education. Towards the end of his life, he lived near his sister, Mrs. Blake-Forster, at Park Lodge, Gort. He died on 14 July 1852 and was buried in the grave of Colman mac Duagh. His sister was grandmother to the writer Charles French Blake-Forster.

== Sources ==
- The Wardenship of Galway, 1791–1831, Martin Coen, private circulation, 1967
- Dr. Edmund Ffrench, Martin Coen, Galway, The Presentation Convent, n.d.
- The Dominicans in Galway 1241–1991, ed. Eustás Ó Héideáin, O.P., 1991
- The Tribes of Galway, Adrian James Martyn, Galway, 2001

Religious titles
Unknown	Warden of Galway; 1812–1831	Office abolished
