= John Skerrett =

John Skerrett may refer to:

- John Skerrett (mayor), mayor of Galway
- John Skerrett (Augustinian), Irish preacher and missionary
- John Byne Skerrett (1778–1814), British soldier who fought in the Peninsular War in Spain.
