= John Kirwan =

John Kirwan may refer to:

- John Óge Kirwan (fl. 1530–1531), mayor of Galway
- Sir John Kirwan (1650–1721), Irish entrepreneur
- John Kirwan (cricketer) (1816–1899), English cricketer
- John Kirwan (politician) (1869–1949), Australian politician
- John William Kirwan (died 1849), president of Queen's College, Galway
- Jack Kirwan (John Henry Kirwan) (1878–1959), Irish international football player who played for Everton, Tottenham and Chelsea
- Jack Kirwan (rugby league) (1896–1968), New Zealand rugby league player
- Sir John Kirwan (rugby) (born 1964), New Zealand rugby player and coach, and mental health advocate
