= Charles French Blake-Forster =

Irish writer

Charles French Blake-Forster (1851–1874) was an Irish writer.

Born at Forster Street House, Galway City, the eldest son of Captain Francis Blake-Forster of the Connaught Rangers, educated at home and later in England. Began to play a prominent part in Galway's public affairs upon his return in his late teens. He became a town councillor, a member of the local Board of Guardians, and in 1874 High Sheriff of Galway Town. He presided in this capacity at three Parliamently elections in 1874. He died aged 23 on 9 September 1874, and was laid to rest in the family vault at Bushypark, on the Galway-Oughterard road.

He had a deep and abiding interest in the history of the county. He contributed a number of articles on this subject to the Galway Vindicator and Galway Express between 1869 and 1871. His only full-length published work, The Irish Chieftains, or, a struggle for the Crown, was published in 1872 by McGlashran & Gill. It was an account of the Williamite War in Ireland from the perspective of Galwegians, many of them historical - Sir Roger O'Shaughnessy - including some of his ancestors.

Some ten other works attributed to him in The Irish Chieftains have never been published nor traced, appearing to have disappeared sometime after his death.

He was a grand-nephew of the last Warden of Galway, Edmund Ffrench.

== Bibliography ==
- The Annals of Corcomroe Abbey in Galway Vindicator, 29 December 1869, 1 January 1870.
- Lemenagh Castle, or, a legend of the wild horse in Galway Vindicator, 12, 16, 19 February 1870.
- The O'Brien Family in Galway Vindicator, 31 December 1870.
- Kilfenora, or Ye City of Ye Crosses in Galway Vindicator, 31 December 1870.
- What are the Arms of Galway? - a historical essay in Galway Express 13, 20, 27 May 1871.
- The Irish Chieftains, or, a struggle for the Crown With numerous notes and copious appendix. An historical novel respecting events in 1689 and following years. McGlashran & Gill, 1872.
