= Athy (disambiguation) =

Athy is a town in County Kildare, Ireland.

Athy may also refer to:

== Associated with Athy, Co. Kildare ==
- Athy (Parliament of Ireland constituency) in the 17th–18th centuries
- Athy railway station
- Athy Cricket Club
- Athy GAA
- Athy Rugby Club

== People ==
- Athy (harpist) (born 1984), Argentinian harpist
- John Athy (fl. 1426–38), Sovereign of Galway
- Margaret Athy (fl. 1508), religious patron in Galway
