= Augustine Kirwan =

Irish priest

Rev. Augustine Kirwan, D.D. (1724 – 7 August 1791), a descendant of one of The Tribes of Galway, Kirwan was Warden of Galway and Vicar of St. Nicholas's church. He had spent forty years as a minister, and founded the town's charity school. His nephew, Nicholas French, erected a monument over his grave as a mark of his respect in 1796.

== See also ==
- William Ó Ciardhubháin
