= Martin J. Blake =

Irish historian (c. 1853 - c. 1930)

Martin Joseph Blake (born c. 1853) was an Irish historian who died around 1930.

Blake was a descendant of one of The Tribes of Galway, and some of his noteworthy work was the publication, in two volumes, of much of the extant documents of the Blake family of Galway from 1315 to the 18th century. He was a substantial contributor to the early volumes of the Journal of the Galway Archaeological and Historical Society.

== Selected bibliography ==
- Knockmoy Abbey otherwise called the Monastery of the "Hill of Victory" [Collis Victoriæ]. Notes on its history, and some ancient charters relating to it (hitherto unpublished), in Journal of the Galway Archaeological and Historical Society, i, 1900.
- The successors of St. Jarlath [addenda to Richard J. Kelly's paper, p107], J.G.A.H.S., iii, 1901.
- Blake Family Records, volume one, 1902
- An account of the castle and manor of Bunowen in the Barony of Ballinahinch, County of Galway, and its successive proprietors from the 15th century to the present time, i, 1902
- The Abbey of Athenry, J.G.A.H.S., ii, 1902
- Ballintubber Abbey: notes on its history, ii, 1903
- A transplanter’s decree of final settlement by the Loughrea Commissioners in Cromwell’s time, iii, 1904
- Blake Family Records, volume two, 1905
- The Arms of the Corporate Town of Galway, i, 1905
- Will of Geoffrey French of Galway, A.D. 1528, iv, 1906
- Supplemental list, i, 1907
- Galway Corporation Book B, ii, 1907
- A map of part of the County of Mayo in 1584: With notes thereon and an account of its author, and his descendants, 145-158 [duplicate pagination: 145-148 had already been used in the list of members in No. ii], iv, 1908
- Notes on the persons named in the obituary book of the Franciscan monastery at Galway-(continued) volume 7, i, 1911
- O’Shaughnessy tabular pedigree [Vol. VI, No.i.], Correction, ditto.
- William de Burgh, progenitor of the Burkes in Ireland, volume 7, ii, 1911
- Notes on the place-names mentioned in Browne’s Map of Mayo, 1584 (continued), 39-55, volume 8, i, 1913
- An old Lynch manuscript, volume 8, ii, 1913
- Account of the Lynch family, and of memorable events of the town of Galway, written in 1815 by John, son of Alexander, Lynch, volume 8, iii, 1914
- An old Lynch manuscript (continued) volume 8, iv, 1914
- Field-Marshal Sir John French, ditto.
- Pedigree of Lynch of Lavally, County Galway, volume 10, i & ii, 1917
- The families of French of Duras, Cloghballymore, and Drumharsna, with tabular pedigree, iii & iv, 1918
- corrigendum to D'Arcy pedigree in No. i–ii, ditto.
- Families of Daly in Galway with tabular pedigrees, and four tables, volume 13, iii & iv, 1927.
- The Franciscan convents in Connacht. With notes thereon, ii, volume 14, 1928
- Castle Bourke, formerly Kilboynell Castle in Carra Barony, Co. Mayo, with notes on the history of its ancient owner the clan MacEvilly (Stauntons) and on the history of the family of Bourke, Viscounts Mayo, iii & iv, volume 14, 1929
- The Westport chalice, made by Peter Brown of Westport, for the Austin Convent of Murrisk, in 1724, ditto.
- The Teige Morphy-Margrett ffargus Chalice, 1720, i & ii, volume 15, 1930
