= John Bodkin (Warden of Galway) =

John Bodkin (died 1710) was a Roman Catholic Warden of Galway. After his death, his body was said to have been the subject of a miracle, because it was believed to have not decayed.

== Biography ==
Bodkin was a member of the Bodkin family, one of the 14 Tribes of Galway. He was the Warden of Galway when the town surrendered to troops led by Godert de Ginkell, 1st Earl of Athlone on 26 July 1691. When handing over the keys of St. Nicholas' Collegiate Church to Ginkell's soldiers, he cried out in despair: "My God, that my right hand may not decay until the key of this church be restored to its proper owners". St. Nicholas's was reconsecrated into the Church of Ireland. Bodkin died in 1710 while the Penal Laws were extant.

== Body ==
In March 1838, workmen were carrying out repairs on the vaults and tombs near the main altar of St Nicholas’ Collegiate Church. They discovered a body, apparently incorrupt. It was determined to be the body of John Bodkin. This caused a sensation in the town, especially among the largely Roman Catholic population. According to a statement by the supervisor, Mr. Clare,

"... members of the old families, the descendants of the Tribes, began to frequent the church. Many of them pointed out to me the vault which, they said, contained the remains of the Very Rev Warden Bodkin... upon opening the vault I was the first to descend. I found the body of a man, all perfect, except for his toes. Many of the by-standers stated that they had been broken off by one of the covering flags that broke and fell into the vault 100 years before this date."

Concerning the body, Mr. Clare said:

"The hands were in all appearance perfect, even to the nails and fingers, not discoloured. The face perfect the ears and top of the nose, all the teeth were perfectly white, all the skin (not) discoloured. By my pressing my hand on any part of this body, it felt quite elastic."

== Reactions ==
Galway historian Ronnie O'Gorman writes that:

"... even through the worst of the Penal times ... [an] ‘underground’ Catholic wardenship existed side by side with the ‘Protestant’ wardenship when religious toleration was at its lowest. Deceased members of Catholic tribal families were always allowed to be buried in the Collegiate Church. This cosy arrangement continued until the middle of the 19th century. One of the significances of Bodkin’s preserved corpse was that he was the last Catholic warden."

Among most of the population, it was held that the return of the church to the Catholics of Galway was imminent. O’Gorman goes on to say that:

"Thousands came on to the streets and stood around the church alarmed and mystified at what it meant. Inside the church there was chaos. For three days members of the Tribal families and inhabitants of the town and the surrounding villages pushed their way to stare into the vault. The crowds became so dense that work had to stop. ‘Many false reports were in circulation, some saying that Bodkin held keys firmly in his hand, and other reports (all of which were) equally untrue.’ Work had to be discontinued. At the end of the third day, the church was cleared of people. Mr Clare locked up and handed the key of the church to the sexton, Henry Caddy. He went home to think about how to progress the refurbishment in such a crisis.

The next morning he was woken at 6 o’clock and told that Bodkin’s arm was missing....... "

== Deception ==
Clare was woken by John McMahon, foreman carpenter, with the news that that body had been desecrated and the right arm missing. McMahon, a Presbyterian, feared that as the local Catholics "held this relic sacred [they] would be likely to accuse him of the deed." Sexton Caddy was summoned and closely questioned by the workmen about the body. He denied he did anything. The men threatened to throw him off the nearby bridge into the River Corrib. He was being actually dragged to the bridge before he confessed that he had given the key that night to a Mr. Timothy Murray. Mr. Clare went to Murray’s office, and had it confirmed that he did indeed have the key, but would only give it to his parish priest, Rev. Dr. Roch, who was duly sent for.

While Clare was seeking the key, crowds of people began to rush the church in the hope of witnessing a miracle. Fr. Roch arrived and was so concerned at the large number present that he told them to return at two p.m. when he would replace the hand. At two p.m., thousands of people were crammed into the church and the surrounding streets, but Fr. Roch did not arrive until four p.m. He produced the hand, its fingers cut off from the palm.

Mr. Clare’s statement finished by stating that:

"“During the day the carpenter got a coffin made into which I put the body. At lifting the body, I found that the skin had been cut off the breast. The amputated hand I put into the coffin with the body. Many persons there stated it was the fourth time that a coffin had been worn out by the remains. I then closed the coffin and vault in such a way that there can be no access to it except by ripping up the floor."

A suggestion made to Mr. Clare was that perhaps it would be better if Bodkin’s remains were buried elsewhere. He put this question to the Vicar General, Rev. Laurence O’Donnell, who replied: "Do not remove it. I think it is a kind of a possession, whereas part of his prayer has been granted. It is likely the reminder of it be accomplished in its own time."
