= Richard Huskard =

Anglo-Irish settler

Richard Huskard (fl. 1278?–1333) was an Anglo-Irish settler. He was an ancestor of the family of Skerrett, who later became one of The Tribes of Galway. Later bearers of the name included John Skerrett (Mayor) (fl.1491–1492) and John Skerrett (Augustinian) (c.1620–c.1688). An earlier Richard Huskard held land near Galway in 1278.

Huskard was the original form of the surname Skerrett, as huscarl, a compound word of two distinct words in Old English, hus (house) and churl (a peasant. Presumptive descendants include

- John Skerrett (Mayor), 7th Mayor of Galway, 1491–1492.
- James Skerrett, fl. 1513–1532, Mayor of Galway.
- John Skerrett (Augustinian), Irish Preacher and Missionary, c.1620–c.1688.

== See also ==
- Churl
