= Nicholas Lynch (priest) =

Irish Dominican priest (1590–1634)

Nicholas Lynch (c. 1590 – 1634) was an Irish priest of the Dominican Order. He also held the position of prior of Galway.

== Biography ==
Lynch was a member of Galway's most powerful merchant family - his father was Nicholas Lynch fitz Stephen, and his brothers were Sir Henry Lynch, 1st Baronet (agent of Richard Burke, 4th Earl of Clanricarde and recorder of Galway) and Dr. Thomas Lynch (Mayor of Galway 1625-26). He was educated at St. Patrick's College, Lisbon, and Salamanca University. Returning to Galway in 1621, he was permitted by the Dominican master general to travel in 1623 to Spain, where he used ransom money paid to Zidan el Nasir, which secure the release of Anthony Lynch (STM) from slavery in Morocco.

He was described by Viscount Wilmot, Lord President of Connacht, in 1624 as the 'chief father' of the Dominican order, as 'a very learned man and of great estimation among them'. He was alleged to have arrived back from Spain with money to support a Spanish invasion of Galway and Connacht.

From about 1625 Lynch was associated with Dominican education in Galway - Tomás S.R. Ó Floinn believes he may have been its prime instigator. As prior of Galway, in 1626-27 he was signatory with his fellow Dominicans, Peter Martin (STP), Stephen Lynch (Franciscan), Dominic Lynch, and Richard Bermingham, of an agreement ratifying the establishment and status of Dominican schools in the town. He succeeded Ross MacGeoghegan as Irish provincial in June 1627. Later that year he applied to Propaganda Fide for special faculties for administration in the province.

In February 1629 he presided over a provincial chapter held at Athenry, after which he left for Rome to represent the Irish province at the general chapter held in June. During the chapter, he and Michael O'Connor (Michael of the Holy Spirit) were named Masters of Theology, with Richard Caron honoured with the degree sacrae theologiae praesentatus.

Lynch departed Rome for Louvain, arriving there in September, en route for Ireland. He was in Brussels on 8 March 1630 where he received 100 crowns from Philip IV of Spain, as he and his two companions were straited after their journey from Rome. That same year he had his term of office extended to 1632 by Pope Urban VIII. Hugh O'Donnell, 2nd Earl of Tyrconnell nominated him for the see of Achonry,

However Lynch never returned to Ireland, due to a new era of persecution. As a result of this he travelled to Lisbon - arriving in January 1632 - en route to Seville, where a never-held chapter was to be held. A further extension of his office was made while he resided in Portugal and Spain, during which he petitioned Philip IV for help to restore the Dominican province in Ireland, and presided over a chapter of the Portuguese province. He left Portugal for Rome, where on 1 March 1634 he was named prior of San Sisto Vecchio. He was nominated that year for Killala or Achonry by Niccolò Ridolfi.

Lynch died in July 1634, and was buried in what was then the principal church of the Dominicans, Santa Maria sopra Minerva.

Ó Floinn summed up Lynch as follows:

"Nicholas Lynch was representative of a new breed of confident, energetic, and highly confident, energetic, and highly competent Irish Dominicans in the seventeenth century, springing from the renaissance of reformed Dominican life in continental Europe. He was an internationalist, thanks, in part, to the cosmopolitan world of his family and his order, and was as much at home in Lisbon, Salamanca, Rome, and Louvain as in Galway and Sligo."

== Sources ==
- The Irish Dominicans, 1536-1641, Thomas S. Flynn,
- "Nicholas Lynch", by Tomás S.R. Ó Floinn, pp. 643–44, Biographical Dictionary of Ireland, 2009.
- The Tribes of Galway:1124-1642, Adrian Martyn, Galway, 2016.
