= High Sheriff of Galway =

High Sheriff of Galway may refer to either of two High Shrievalties

- High Sheriff of County Galway, which covers the County of Galway
- High Sheriff of Galway Town, which covers the County of the Town of Galway
