= Nicholas Lynch =

Nicholas Lynch may refer to:

- Nicholas Lynch (priest) (c. 1590–1634), Irish Dominican priest
- Nicholas Lynch (politician) (1827–1900), Irish politician and businessman
