= Eyre Square =

Square in Galway, Ireland

- An Fhaiche Mhór
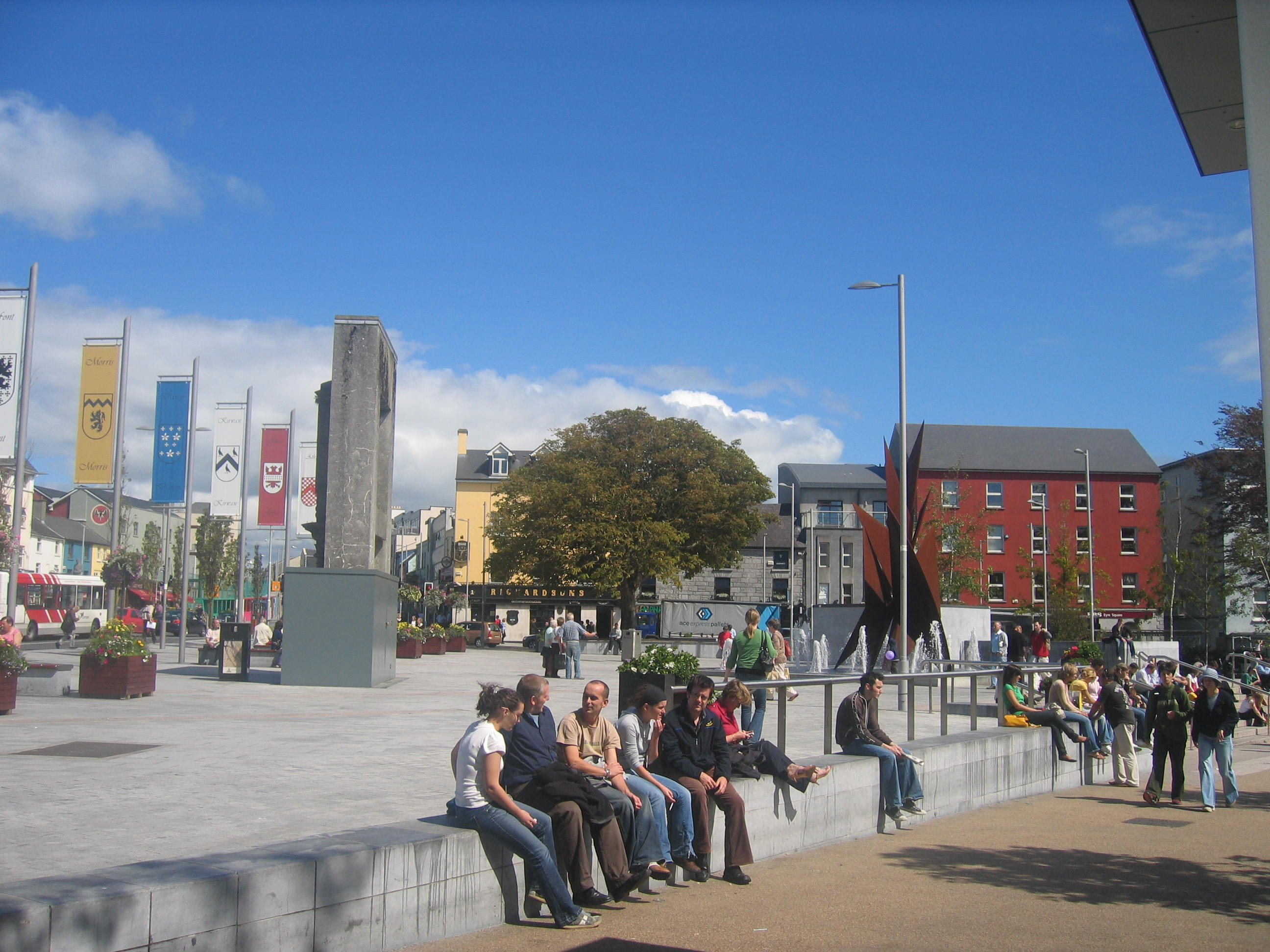
- Interactive map of Eyre Square
- Location: Galway
- Coordinates: 53.2745°N 9.0490°W
- Area: 3 acres (1.2 ha)
- Elevation: 10 metres (33 ft)
- Established: 1710
- Etymology: Edward Eyre (mayor 1710–11)
- Operator: Galway City Council
- Public transit: Ceannt Station

Eyre Square (/ɛər/ AIR; Irish: An Fhaiche Mhór) is a city public park in Galway, Ireland. The park is within the city centre, adjoining the nearby shopping area of William Street and Shop Street. Galway railway station is adjacent to Eyre Square.

The park is rectangular, surrounded on three sides by streets that form the major traffic arteries into Galway city centre; the west side of the square was pedestrianised in 2006. The square is occasionally although rarely sometimes referred to as John F. Kennedy Memorial Park.

== History ==
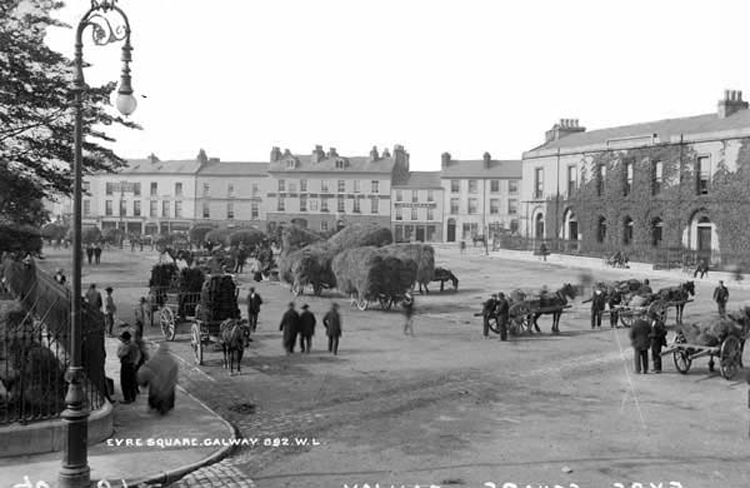
Eyre Square c. 1897

The origin of the square comes from medieval open space in front of a town gate, known as the Green. Markets mostly took place in the northern part of the space. The earliest endeavour to formally enclose it was recorded in 1631. Some ash-trees were planted and the park was enclosed by a wooden fence. The plot of land that became Eyre Square was officially presented to the city in 1710 by Mayor Edward Eyre, from whom it took its name.

In 1801, General Meyrick erected a stone wall around the square, which was later known as Meyrick Square. In the middle of the 19th century, the whole park underwent a redevelopment in Georgian style.

In September 1873, a statue of Ulick de Burgh, Lord Dunkellin, the former Liberal MP for Galway borough (1857-1865) and later County Galway (1865-1867) was unveiled in the park following his death in 1867, caused by Bright’s disease (nephritis). Within three months, £1,600 was raised to pay for the statue, which was acquired through threats made to tenants of Lord Clanricarde of Portumna, Lord Dunkellin as well as donations. The statue was sculpted by John Henry Foley. On the 25th of May 1922, the statue was removed by the Galway Town Tenant's League, paraded through the streets and thrown in the River Corrib.

In the 1960s, a full-scale reconstruction started and iron railings were removed and relocated to the backyard of St. Nicholas' Collegiate Church.

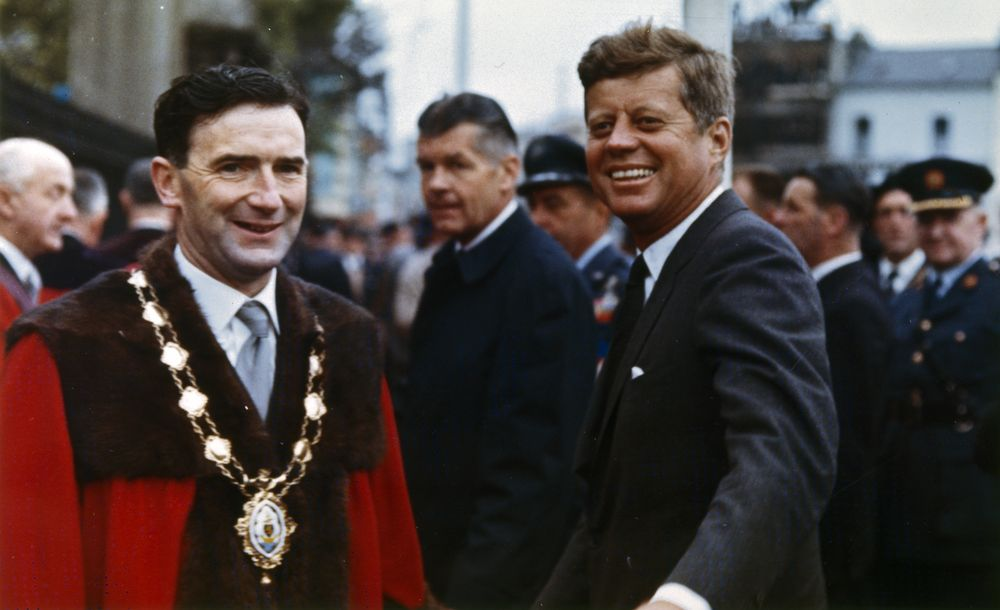
Mayor of Galway Patrick D. Ryan and US President John F. Kennedy in Galway in 1963

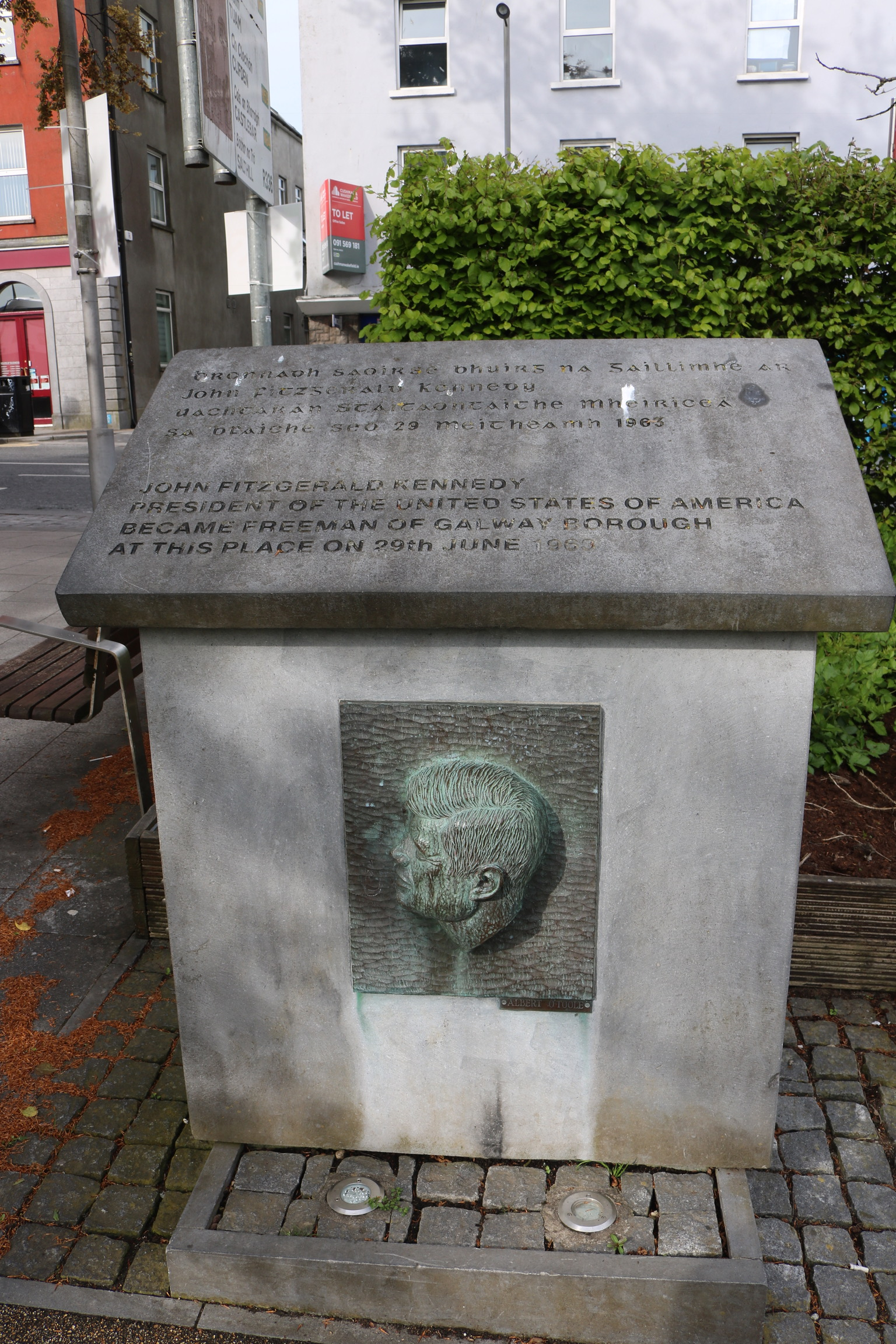
Bust commemorating Kennedy's time in Galway

In 1965, the square was officially renamed 'John F. Kennedy Memorial Park' in honour of U.S. President John F. Kennedy; despite the renaming, the square is still widely known as Eyre Square. Kennedy had visited Galway City and made a speech in the square on 29 June 1963, the first U.S. president to do so during his term of office. A monument dedicated to JFK was erected on the site of his address, and later replaced by a bust in 2005.

In 1991, two shopping centres opened in the area: Corrib Shopping Centre (originally occupied by Roches Stores) and Eyre Square Centre.

A controversial and massively over-budget redevelopment of the square began in 2004. There was considerable unease in the city when it was reported that the original building contractors, Samuel Kingston Construction Ltd, had left the site and were not returning. After many long delays the square finally reopened on 13 April 2006 having astonishingly cost over €20 million to redevelop. Despite an unpopular reception by Galway natives, the finished square received the Irish Landscape Institute Design Award in 2007.

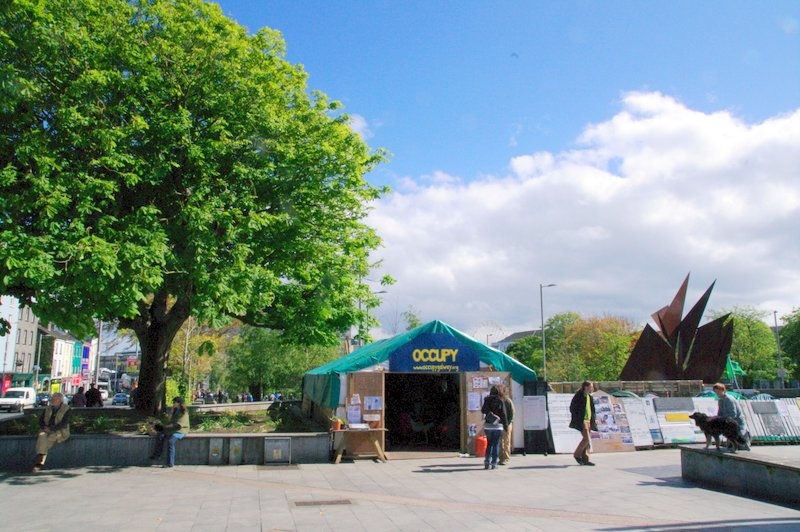
Occupy Galway Camp with the fountain depicting the Galway Hookers in the background

Eyre Square hosted the third-longest Occupy camp in the world, running for 7 months from October 2011 until May 2012. Inspired by Occupy Wall Street, a group of Galwegians established the camp to protest social injustices and the lack of accountability among states and banking institutions, using the public space to hold general assemblies, workshops and debates. The camp, maintained by a mix of volunteers, aimed to highlight the wealth divide between the 1% who profited from the 2009 banking crash and the 99% who bore its consequences. On 16 May 2012 the camp was cleared by 50 members of An Garda Siochana, with one person arrested. One year later, participants and supporters returned for one day of public discussion and discourse at Eyre Square.

== Statues and attractions ==
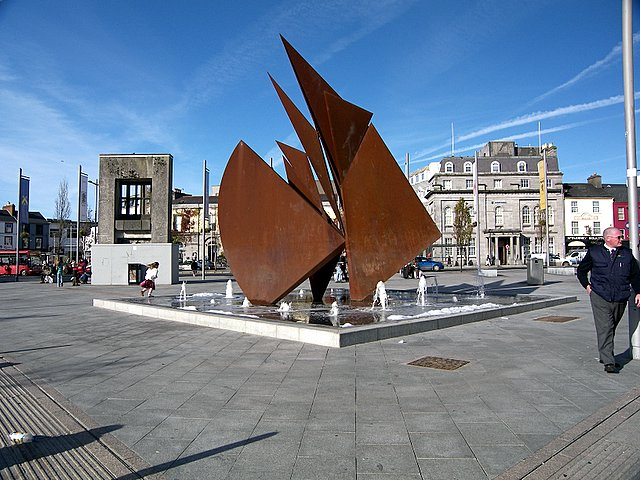
Fountain depicting Galway Hookers in Eyre Square with Browne doorway in background

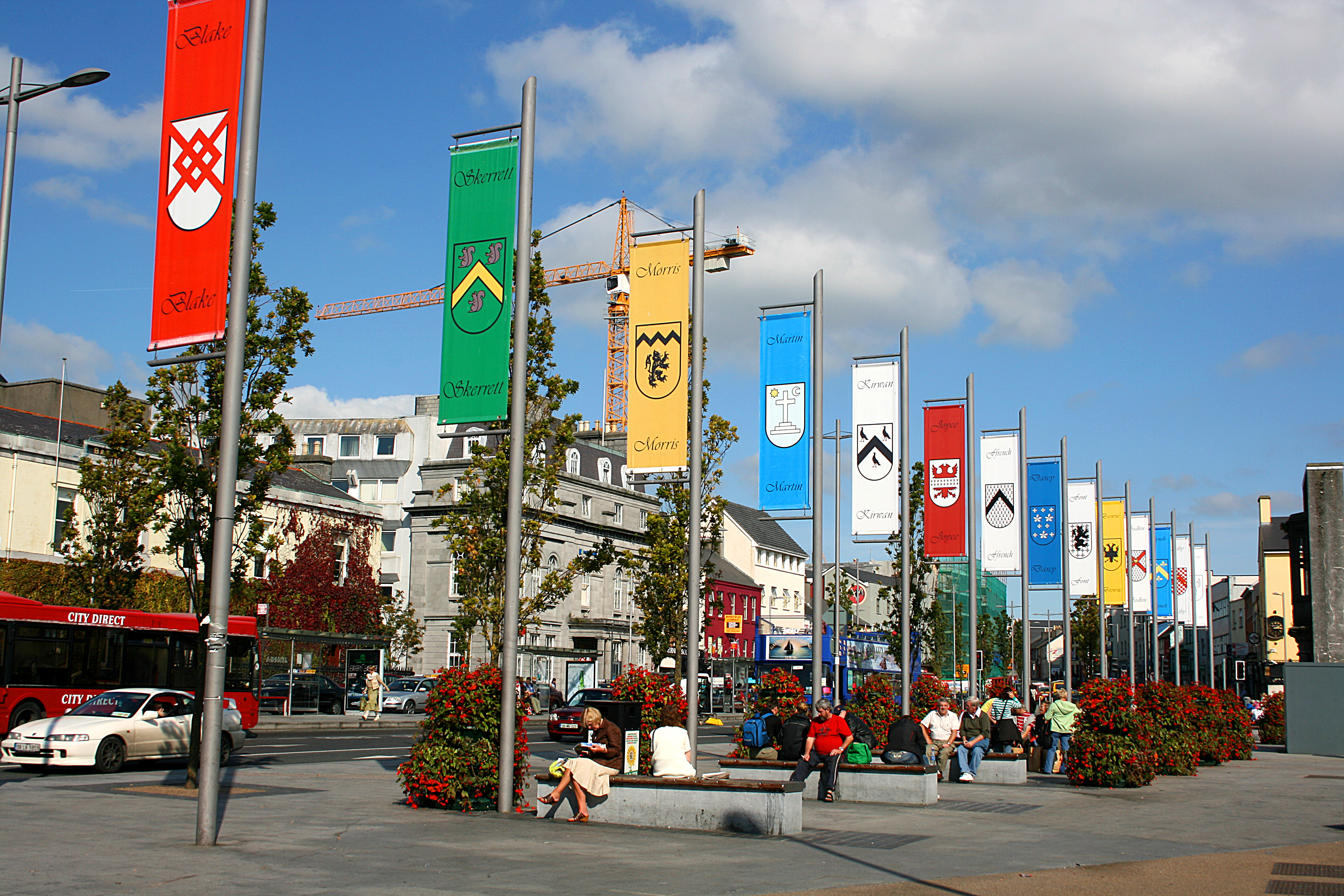
Banners on Eyre Square showing the names and coats of arms of the 'Tribes of Galway' who founded the city.

Before the most recent, controversial re-landscaping, the park used to house two large cast-iron cannons which were presented in recognition of the service of the Connaught Rangers, an Irish Regiment in the British Army, in the Crimean War.

A statue of Irish language writer Pádraic Ó Conaire was erected in his memory in 1935. There is a portrait bust of U.S. President John F. Kennedy in the park,

In 1957, a statue of Liam Mellows (1892–1992), a hero of the War of Independence, was erected in the car park to the east of the Browne Doorway.

The Browne Doorway was the original doorway of the 1627 Browne family home on Lower Abbeygate Street. In 1905, it was moved from Abbeygate Street to Eyre Square. Recently it has been reinforced and encased in plexiglass due to neglect.

Banners representing the fourteen Tribes of Galway (Treibheanna na Gaillimhe) are located in the north section of the park. The Tribes were merchant families that dominated the political, commercial, and social life of the city between the mid-13th and late 19th centuries.
