= Anthony Lynch =

Anthony Lynch may refer to:

- Anthony Lynch (Gaelic footballer) (born 1977), Irish sportsperson
- Anthony Lynch (Dominican) (c. 1576–after 1636)
