= John Skerrett (Augustinian) =

Irish missionary

John Skerrett (Augustinian), Irish preacher and missionary, c.1620–c.1688.

John Skerrett was a member of one of the Tribes of Galway, a descendant of Richard Huskard. He studied for the clergy in Andalusia, and afterwards he was ordained as a member of the Augustinian order. He gained an excellent reputation as a preacher at Cádiz, where he also taught moral theology.

After about twenty years in Spain he was stationed at Orotava and Puerto de la Cruz on Tenerife for four years, following which he returned to Galway, sometime in the 1660s. While there he taught Latin and was prior of the order's town convent.

Skerrett is notable for been the first Augustinian missionary in the Americas, working mainly in Virginia and the West Indies during the 1670s, as well as Cuba and Puerto Rico in the 1680s.

The last documented reference to him is as the Commissary-General of the Augustinians in England in 1688.

== See also ==
- John Skerrett (Mayor) of Galway 1491–1492.
- James Skerrett, fl. 1513–1532, Mayor of Galway.
- Nicholas Skerrett, died 1583, Archbishop of Tuam
- Michael Skerrett, died 1785, Archbishop of Tuam
