= Thomas Lynch (mayor) =

Thomas Lynch (Mayor), eighth Mayor of Galway, 1492–1493.

Thomas was a sun of Eamonn a Tun Lynch, so called because of the large quantity of wine he imported into Galway. Edmund was distinguished by erected the Great West Bridge in 1442, which was the town's first bridge over the Corrib. It was later replaced by Thomas Óge Martyn's bridge of 1562.

Civic offices
| Preceded by John Skerrett | Mayor of Galway; 1492–1493 | Succeeded by James Lynch fitz Stephen |
