= Edward Berwick =

Irish lawyer (1804-1877)

Edward Berwick (1804-1877) was an Irish lawyer and educationalist, and served as President of Queen's College Galway from 1849 until 1877.

== Life ==
Berwick was the younger son of the Rev. Edward Berwick (1750-1820), a Church of Ireland clergyman who was rector of the parish of Esker, County Dublin, and later vicar of Leixlip, County Kildare. His mother was Edward's second wife Rebecca Shuldham, daughter of Pooley Shuldham of Ballymulvey, County Longford. Given personal tuition by Dionysius Lardner, he lived with Lardner at Bray and later in Gardiner St. and gave evidence in the divorce case of Heaviside v. Lardner, where Lardner was co-respondent with Mary Spice Heaviside in the action brought by her husband Captain Richard Heaviside.

Educated at Trinity College Dublin, he graduated in law and was called to the Irish Bar in 1832. On the foundation of Queen's College Galway in 1845, Berwick was appointed to the office of Vice-President. The president, Joseph W. Kirwan, died in office in December 1849, and Berwick was appointed to succeed him in 1850. He was mainly an administrator and published very little. He did, however, play a considerable role in structuring the Bachelor of Arts degree, and in establishing history and English literature in the curriculum.

Berwick died in office in 1877.

== Family ==
He was the younger half-brother of Walter Berwick, the Irish Bankruptcy judge, who was killed in the Abergele rail disaster of 1868, along with their sister Elizabeth Mary and a young girl called Louisa Symes, probably a relative, who was travelling with them. Edward is mentioned in a letter from Walter to Lardner in 1828. Edward gave evidence at the accident inquest (see The Times, Thursday, 27 August 1868; pg. 7; Issue 26214; col D The Accident To The Irish Mail Train.)

== Notes ==
Academic offices
Preceded by Joseph W. Kirwan	President of Queen's College Galway; 1849–1877	Succeeded by Thomas William Moffett
