= John Athy =

John Athy (fl. 1426–38) was Sovereign of Galway.

Athy was a member of one of the fourteen families that would later become known as the Tribes of Galway. Several members of the family were killed in a feud with the Blake family, c. 1440.

== See also ==
- Margaret Athy

Civic offices
Unknown	Sovereign of Galway; 1426–1427	Unknown
Unknown	Sovereign of Galway; 1437–1438	Unknown
