= History of Galway =

Irish municipal history

Galway, a small city in Ireland, situated on the west coast of Ireland, has a complex history going back around 800 years. The city was the only medieval city in the province of Connacht.

== (Alternative) derivations of the name ==
The city takes its name from that of the river, the Gaillimh. The word Gaillimh means "stony" as in "stony river". Today, the river is commonly called the River Corrib, after Lough Corrib, just to the north. In Irish, Galway is also called Cathair na Gaillimhe ("city of Galway") to distinguish it from Contae na Gaillimhe/County Galway.

There are multiple alternative derivations of the name, some conjectural and some mythical:

- The commonly held view that the city takes its name from the Irish word Gallaibh, "foreigners" i.e. "the town of the foreigners" (from Gall, a foreigner) is incorrect, since the name Gaillimh was applied to the river first and then later on to the town. Also the common word gallaibh (which is pronounced with a broad initial letter a) has never been used as an alternative spelling of Gaillimh (which is pronounced without a broad initial letter a).
- The daughter of a local chieftain drowned in the river, and her name was Gailleamh, thus the river was given her name. The chieftain was so distraught that he set up camp at the point to mourn her spirit and keep it company. Later, a town sprung up around the point, and was called Gaillimh in her honour.

== Early Galway ==
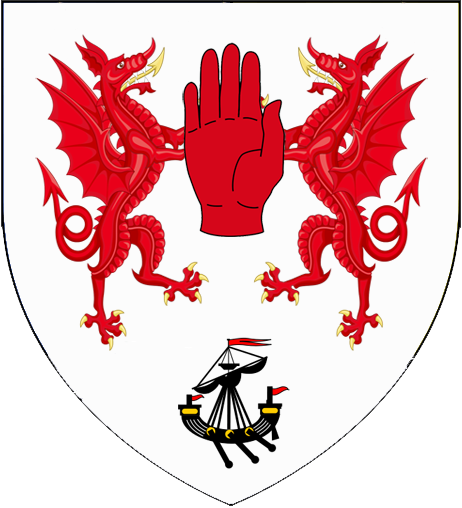
The Ó Flaithbertaigh held Gaillimh at the time of the Norman invasion of the Burkes.

Dún Bhun na Gaillimhe ('Fort at the Mouth of the Gaillimh') was constructed in 1124 as a naval base and military fort, by the King of Connacht and High King of Ireland, Tairrdelbach Ua Conchobair, who anchored his fleet there. The Annals of the Four Masters note that in that year "Three castles were erected by the Connaughtmen, the castle of Dun-Leodhar, the castle of the Gaillimh, and the castle of Cuil-maeile." This fort is also called a caislean (castle) in the annals. It was attacked in 1132 and 1149. Galway lay in the túath of Clann Fhergail which covered the parishes of St. Nicholas (the medieval city), Roscam and part of Baile an Chláir / Claregalway parish. This district was held by the Ó hAllmhuráin/O'Halloran clan. Clann Fhergail itself was a sub district of Uí Bhriúin Seola the territory of which is called Maigh Seola ('plain of Seola'). The Ó Flaithbheartaigh (O'Flaherty) clan held it up until the Norman invasion of Connacht in the 1230s. As Dún Bhun na Gaillimhe lay in the territory of the O Flahertys they are often recorded as holding this fort for the O Connor Kings of Connacht.

Following an unsuccessful week-long siege in 1230, Dún Bhun na Gaillimhe was captured by Richard Mor de Burgh in 1232. In the century that followed, Galway thrived under the de Burghs (Burkes). After the sundering of the de Burgh (Clanrickards) dynasty in 1333, anxious to have control over their own affairs without the interference of the Gaelicised and often feuding Burkes, Galway sought local autonomy, receiving a murage charter (authority to build a defensive wall) from the Crown in 1396. Governed by a clique of English-oriented merchant families, who eventually became known as The Tribes of Galway, Galway became to a large degree culturally and politically aloof (but not isolated) from the surrounding Gaelic and Gaelic-Norman territories.

== From the medieval era to the 16th century ==
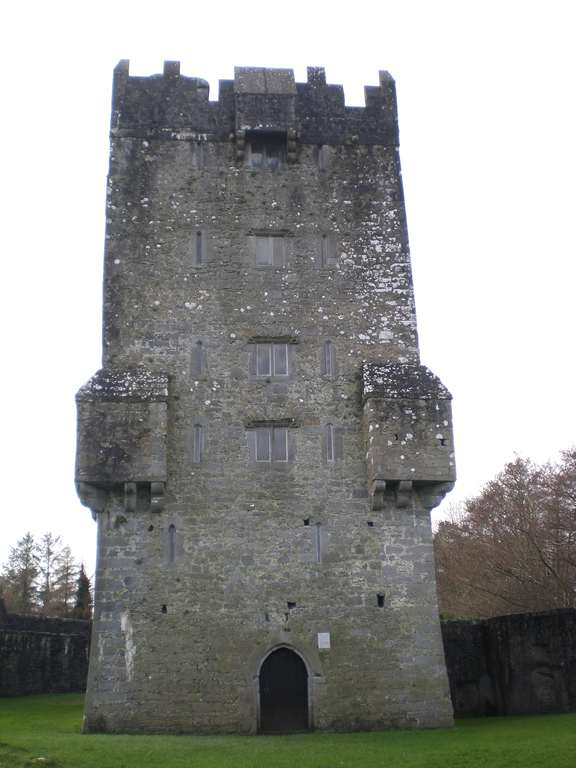
Built by the O'Flahertys, c. 1500, Aughnanure Castle (Caisleán Achadh na nIúr)

Galway received a municipal charter from the crown in December 1484. This ensured the town's independence from the Clanrickard Burkes. At the same time, the creation of the wardenship of Galway gave the townsmen control of the large parish church, St. Nicholas' Collegiate Church.

During the Middle Ages, Galway was ruled by an oligarchy of fourteen merchant families (12 of Anglo-Norman origin and 2 of Irish origin), the Tribes of Galway. The city thrived on international trade. In the Middle Ages, it was the principal Irish port for trade with Spain and France, being the main source of trade to the Western Isles, Scotland, during the Lordship of the Isles. The population of medieval Galway is thought to have been about 3,000.

In 1477 Christopher Columbus visited Galway, possibly stopping off on a voyage to Iceland or the Faroe Islands. Seven or eight years later, he noted in the margin of his copy of Imago Mundi: "Men of Cathay have come from the west. [Of this] we have seen many signs. And especially in Galway in Ireland, a man and a woman, of extraordinary appearance, have come to land on two tree trunks [or timbers? or a boat made of such?]" The most likely explanation for these bodies is that they were Inuit swept eastward by the North Atlantic Current.

By the 1460s Galway was regarded as a beautiful and well-built town, but it endured difficult relations with its Irish neighbours. A notice over the west gate of the city, completed in 1562 by Mayor Thomas Óge Martyn, proclaimed: "From the Ferocious O'Flahertys may God protect us". A bylaw of 1460 ordained as follows: "That no dweller should set or sell land or tenement, within the same town Galway, to no Irishman, without licence from the council for the time being, on payn of forfaiting saidlands and tenements, and one hundred shillings to be divided as above written".

Despite this, Galway showed signs of linguistic and cultural assimilation to the Gaelic society around it. An Act of Henry VIII, dated 1536, ordained as follows:

Item, that everie inhabitant, as well within the said towne, as the suburbs of the same, doe shave theire over lipps, called crompeaulis [ Irish: croiméil "moustaches" ]; and suffer the haire of their hedds to growe, till it cover theire eares, and that every one of them weare English capps.
Item, that noe man, woman or childe, weare noe mantles in the streets, but cloaks or gowns, dubletts and hose, shapen after the English fashion, of the country cloth, or any other cloth it shall please them to buy.
Item, that noe man, woman or child, weare, in their shirts, or any other garments, no saffron [a favourite colour of the native Irish]...
Item, that every inhabitant within oure said towne endeavour themselfes to speake English, and to use themselfes after the English facon; and, speciallye, that you, and every one of you, doe put your children to scole, to lerne to speke English...

The political turbulence of the region left its mark on Galway in the following decades. Sir Henry Sidney wrote in 1576: "First, I find the town of Galwaye moche decaied, both in nomber of expert sage men of yeares and yonge men of warre, in respect of that I have seen; which great decay hath growen thorough the horribl spoyle done upon them by the sonnes of the earle of Clanrickrd, in so moche as it evidentlye proved before me that fiftie howsholders of that towne doe nowe enhabite under Mac William Croghter [a local Irish lord]…"

Nevertheless, Galway retained its distinctive physical character. The following account was given of lord justice Sir William Pelham's visit in 1579: "His lordship removed into the towne of Galwaie, twelve mills, verie rocky way, and full of great loughes. The townw is well bulte, and walled, with an excellent good haven, and is replenished with many welthie merchants. The townes-men and wemmen present a more civil shew of life than other townes in Ireland do, and maie be compared, in my judgement, next Dublin and Watterford, the only towne".

The commercial and political situation of Galway bred wariness in its merchants, as shown in a provision of its new charter:

That when anie strange merchants come to their port and haven, that the same be serched and viewed for weapons and munitions, and that none above the number of ten persons of the said ship shall come into the said towne.

Galway, because of its loyalty to the Crown, was used as an occasional administrative centre by the English authorities. The Lord Deputy Sir Richard Bingham, noted for his severity, is described in the Annals as having executed seventy men and women in Galway in January 1586. In 1588, the year of the Spanish Armada, the Lord Deputy Sir William Fitz-Williams had a number of survivors beheaded near St Augustine's Monastery.

== Decline ==
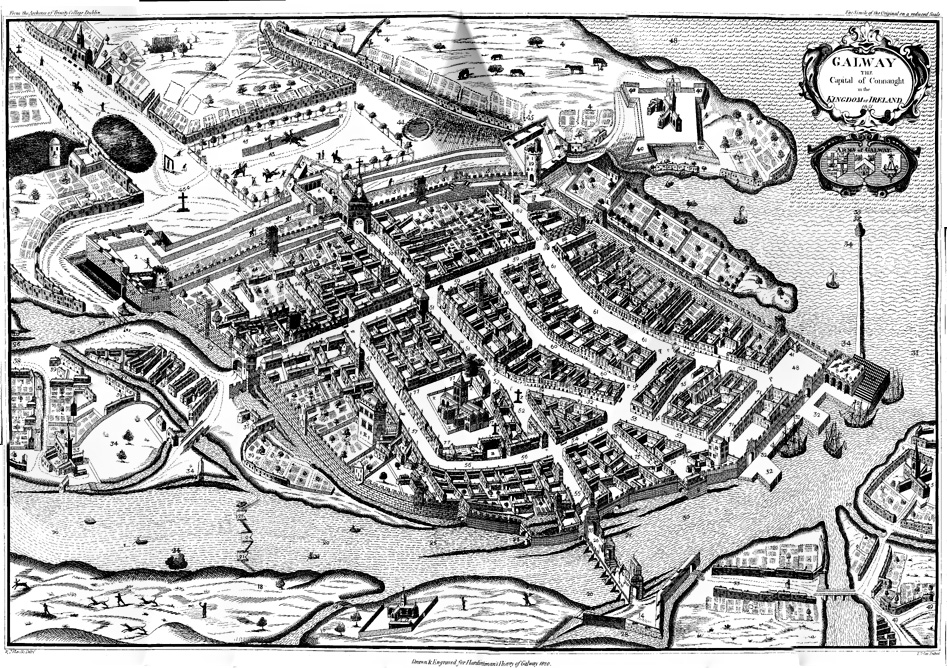
A 1651 map of Galway, the River Corrib, Fort Hill, and the Claddagh around the time of the Irish Confederate Wars

French diplomatic controversy centred in Galway when a likely French warship was wrecked there in 1618. After the Irish Rebellion of 1641, Galway was in a delicate position, caught, in effect between the Catholic rebels (Confederates) and its English garrison ensconced in Fort Hill just outside the city. Eventually, Galway citizens, who were predominantly Catholic, went against their garrison and supported the confederate side in 1642. The fort was besieged with the aid of Confederate troops until it surrendered and its garrison was evacuated by sea. During the 1640s, Galway was heavily fortified against an expected counter-attack by English forces, which eventually materialised when English Parliamentarian forces re-conquered Ireland in 1649–52. Galway surrendered to Cromwellian forces in 1652 after a nine-month siege; plague and expulsions of Catholic citizens followed. The Cromwellian Act of Settlement 1652 caused major upheavals, as peoples from east of the Shannon were transplanted to Connacht and slipped back.

After the demise of the English Commonwealth and the English Restoration in 1660, (and the further Act of Settlement 1662 and its Act of Explanation 1665), the economy of Galway recovered somewhat. In the next crisis, centred on the deposition of the Catholic King James II, in 1689, Galway supported the Jacobite side. It surrendered without a siege under the Articles of Galway of 1691 after the annihilation of the main Jacobite army at the nearby battle of Aughrim. Thereafter, the city became an economic backwater, and the capital of its old great families were spent overseas. It took about 300 years for the city to regain its former status.

== 18th century ==
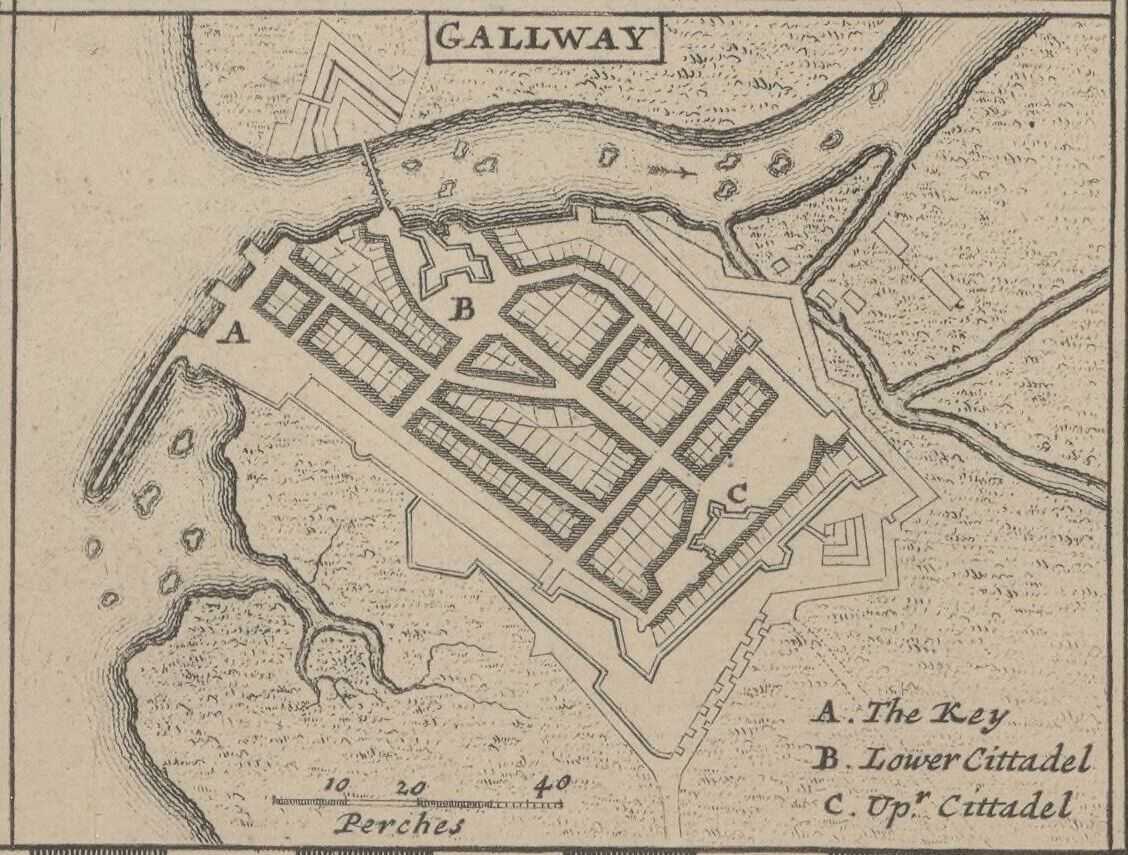
Herman Moll's map of Galway in the early 18th century, highlighting its English port and fortifications

After the 17th century wars, Galway, as a Catholic port city, was treated with great suspicion by the authorities. Legislation of 1704 (the Popery Act) stated that no new Catholics apart from seamen and day labourers could move there. On top of that, when fears arose of a French invasion of Ireland in 1708 and 1715 (during the Jacobite rising of 1715 in Scotland), all Catholics were ordered to leave the city. The corporation, which ran Galway was also confined to Protestants. This is all the more surprising given that a 1762 census showed that of the town's 15,000 or so inhabitants, only 350 were Protestants. The persecution of Galway's old Catholic merchant elite meant that trade declined substantially, and the once busy harbour fell into disrepair. Local traders compensated to some degree for this by smuggling in goods like brandy through gaps in the town walls. On 1 November 1755 the 1755 Lisbon earthquake caused a two-metre tsunami to hit the city's coast, causing some serious damage to the "Spanish Arch" section of the city wall.

== 19th century ==
Galway's economy recovered somewhat from the late 18th as the Penal Laws were relaxed. However the city's rural hinterland suffered terribly in the Great Irish Famine in the 1840s. Unlike other urban centres in 19th century Ireland, which experienced an explosion in their populations, Galway's population actually declined such was the devastation wrought by the famine.

The second half of the century saw some improvement in Galway's position however, as the railway lines reached the city in 1850. Another important development was the creation of a university in Galway in 1845, then named "Queen's University of Ireland".

== 20th century ==
Galway city played a relatively minor role in the upheaval in Ireland from 1916 to 1923. In 1916, during the Easter Rising, Liam Mellows mobilised the local Irish Volunteers in the area to attack the Royal Irish Constabulary barracks at Oranmore, just outside Galway, however they failed to take it and later surrendered in Athenry. During the Irish War of Independence 1919–21, Galway was the western headquarters for the British Army. Their overwhelming force in the city meant that the local Irish Republican Army could do little against them. The only initiatives were taken by the university battalion of the IRA, who were reprimanded by the local IRA commander who was afraid they would provoke reprisals. This fear was not without justification, as the nearby town of Tuam was sacked on two occasions by the Black and Tans in July and September 1920. In November 1920, a Galway city Catholic priest, Fr. Michael Griffin was abducted and shot by the British forces. His body was found in a bog in Barna. Galway businessmen launched a boycott against Northern Irish goods from December 1919 onwards in protest against the loyalist attacks on Catholic nationalists in Belfast, a protest that later spread throughout the country.

Before the outbreak of the Irish Civil War (1922–23), in March 1922, Galway saw a tense stand off between Pro-Treaty and Anti-Treaty troops over who would occupy the military barracks at Renmore. After fighting broke out in July 1922 the city and its military barracks were occupied by troops of the Irish Free State's National Army. Two Free State soldiers and one Anti-Treaty fighter were killed and more wounded before the National Army secured the area. The Republicans burned a number of public buildings in the centre of town before they abandoned Galway.

On 16 August 1971, a large part of the city centre, stretching from Merchants Road to Williamsgate Street and Eyre Square, was destroyed by fire. The destroyed area was subsequently redeveloped as the Eyre Square/Corbett Court/Edward Square shopping centres.

In later years, the resignation of Eamon Casey as Bishop of Galway in "scandalous circumstances" in 1992 came to be seen as pivotal in the Roman Catholic Church's loss of influence in Ireland.

== Annalistic references ==
- 1124. Three castles were erected by the Connaughtmen, the castle of Dun-Leodhar, the castle of the Gaillimh, and the castle of Cuil-maeile.
- 1125. The two sons of Aineislis Ua hEidhin were slain in treachery at Bun-Gaillimhe/Flann and Gillariabhach, the two sons of Aineislis Ua hEidhin, were slain by Conchobhar Ua Flaithbheartaigh.
- 1132 The castle of Bun-Gaillmhe was burned and demolished by a fleet of the men of Munster; and a great slaughter was made of the people of West Connaught, together with Ua Taidhg an Teaghlaigh, and many other noblemen.
- 1132. A hosting on land by Cormac Mac Carthaigh and the nobles of Leath Mogha into ... and Uí Eachach and Corca Laoighdhe, and the fleet of Leath Mogha [came] by sea to meet them, and they demolished the castle of Bun Gaillmhe, and plundered and burned the town. The defeat of An Cloidhe [was inflicted] on the following day on [the men of] Iarthar Connacht by the same fleet, and Conchobhar Ua Flaithbheartaigh, king of Iarthar Connacht, was killed, with slaughter of his people ... together with Ua Taidhg an Teaghlaigh, and many other noblemen.
- 1178. The River Galliv was dried up for a period of a natural day; all the articles that had been lost in it from remotest times, as well as its fish, were collected by the inhabitants of the fortress, and by the people of the country in general.
- 1577. Alexander, son of Calvagh, son of Turlough, son of John Carragh Mac Donnell, was slain in a combat by Theobald Boy Mac Seoinin, in the gateway of Galway; and there were not many sons of gallowglasses in Ireland at that time who were more wealthy, or who were more bountiful and munificent than he.
- 1581. The son of the Earl of Clanrickard, i.e. William Burke, son of Rickard Saxonagh, son of Ulick-na-gCeann, son of Rickard, son of Ulick of Cnoc-Tuagh, was hanged at Galway, the third day after the execution of Turlough O'Brien; that is, Turlough was hanged on Thursday, and William on Saturday. It happened that William was joined with his relatives in the war when they demolished their castles, as we have already mentioned; that he grew sorry for this, and went to Galway, under the protection of the English, the month before his execution; but some tale was fabricated against him, for which he was taken and hanged. Such of his followers as went in under this protection were also hanged.
- 1586. A session was held at Galway in the month of December of this year, and many women and men were put to death at it; and Edmond Oge, the son of Edmond, son of Manus Mac Sheehy, and eight soldiers of the Geraldines along with him, were put to death, information having been given against them that they had been along with those Scots who were slain at Ardnarea.
