= Geoffrey Font =

Irish centenarian

Geoffrey Font (c. 1709–1814) was an Irish centenarian.

According to James Hardiman, Font's family – one of the Tribes of Galway - "settled in Galway in the beginning of the fifteenth century, they sprung from an ancient English family of Leicestershire" (p. 13). He records that Geoffrey "who died near Galway, in 1814, aged 105 years, is supposed to have been the last survivor of the Galway branch of this family." However, Adrian Martyn notes that bearers of the name were recorded in the county during the 1850s in Griffith's valuation.

William Henry suggests that Geoffrey was a descendant of one Geffry Font, town bailiff for the term 1636–37. John Font was portreeve of Galway in 1472, and three members of the family were Mayors of Galway in the 16th century. A roundabout in the town is named after the family.
