= Dominick Kirwin =

Dominick Kirwinfl. 1642–1653 was an Irish Confederate, and was a member of one of The Tribes of Galway,

Kirwin led the raiding party that seized a ship anchored near Galway early in the morning of 19 March 1642. It was a British naval vessel under the command of a Captain Clarke, and had been sent to reinforce the garrison situated at Forthill, overlooking the town. The garrison and its commander, Captain Anthony Willoughby, had been harassing the locals and bombarding the town on a regular basis for several weeks, and negotiations had been held between Willoughby and Walter Lynch, with the Earl of Clanricarde acting as mediator.

Shortly before nine a.m., Kirwin led a group of men including Brian Roe Mahon Móre, Walter Óge Martyn and other natives of the town. They rowed out to the ship on pretense of selling goods, but were fully armed and within minutes seized the ship, killing two of the crew and injuring several others. They then sailed the ship into the quays while under fire from the Forthill garrison; they suffered no direct hits and promptly distributed the goods and military supplies that the ship had held for the garrison. Following this the town gates were shut and the town openly proclaimed it was rebelling.

Kirwin may have survived the subsequent warfare, for following the surrender of Galway in April 1653, he and the rest of his followers were the only townspeople explicitly excluded from the Terms of Surrender. If captured, Kirwin would have been executed. His ultimate fate is unknown.

== See also ==
- History of Galway
- Irish Confederate Wars
- Richard Kirwan
- Joseph W. Kirwan
