= Germyn Lynch =

Irish sailor (died 1483)

Germyn Lynch (fl. 1441–1483) was a merchant and entrepreneur from Galway, Ireland. His life is notable in that few other commoners in late medieval Ireland are so well-documented.

Lynch was a member of one of Tribes of Galway. He was at various times a goldsmith, freeman and Alderman of City of London, and Master of the Irish mints, a post from which he was dismissed five times, for making lightweight coins. As shipmaster he carried pilgrims to Santiago de Compostela, sailed to Iceland for goods, as well as merchandise to and from Bristol.

Timothy O'Neill, in a biography of Lynch, commented that if "such variety can be glimpsed from the scattering of references ... the full life history of Germyn Lynch ... would surely equal the most exciting imaginings of any writer of historical novels."

- A Fifteenth Century Entrepreneur Germyn Lynch fl. 1441–1483, Timothy O'Neill, in Settlement and Society in Medieval Ireland, pp. 421–428, 1988.
- The Tribes of Galway:1124-1642, Adrian Martyn, Galway, 2016.. ISBN 978-0-9955025-0-5
