= Sir John Kirwan =

Irish merchant and politician (1650–1721)

Sir John Kirwan (1650–1721) was an Irish merchant and politician who founded the Kirwans of Castle Hackett, County Galway.

== Background ==
Kirwan was a member of one of the Tribes of Galway. The family were of Gaelic origin, possibly of Conmhaicne descent. They settled in Galway around 1488 under William Ó Ciardhubháin and within a generation had become among the leading merchants of the town. John Óge Kirwan served as Mayor of Galway for the term 1530-1531, followed by Thomas (1534–1535) and Richard (1550–1551), along with numerous bailiffs, sheriffs, and aldermen. In all, eleven Kirwans would be Mayor before the fall of the tribal corporation in 1654.

As a result of the Irish Confederate Wars, almost all of the tribes' property was confiscated. Many were forced to emigrate to the West Indies as indentured servants and in this way the basis of new wealth was accrued in the succeeding generation.

== Career ==
In the late 17th century, Galway experienced a boom in trade with both Europe and the West Indies, trading in tobacco and sugar, along with slaves, salted goods, hides and tallows. Branches of the family settled in Martinique, St. Croix and Montserrat. During Kirwan's lifetime, Ireland, led by the ports of Galway and Cork, was the principal external supply route for provisions to the islands; the annual value of beef exports in 1685 alone was 45,000 pounds.

Kirwan served as Mayor of Galway from 1686 to 1688, and as a Member of Parliament for Galway Borough in the short-lived Patriot Parliament. He was knighted by James II. While he supported the Jacobite side during the Williamite War in Ireland, he surrendered on terms to General Ginkel, was pardoned, and was allowed to hold his property.

== Castle Hackett ==
It is uncertain how Kirwan acquired Castle Hackett, except it was probably sometime in the late 1690s. He would have lived in the original castle built by the Hackett family, at the foot of Cnoc Meadha, while the new house of the same name was being built. It was completed in 1703. Located six miles from Tuam, 3-story house called Castlehacket which was burned in 1923 during the Irish Civil War. The last member of the family to bear the name, Sir Denis Kirwan Bernard, died unmarried in 1956 and was buried on the summit of Cnoc Meadha. It was inherited by his nephew, Percy Paley, who died there in 1986.

== Children and descendants ==
Kirwan and his wife, Maria, had at least three children - Simon, Mary, Anne. Mary married Arthur French of Tyrone House; Anne married Sir Walter Blake of Menlough in 1687; Simon married Julian French, sister of Christopher French, father of Arthur, above.

Descendants of the family include Sir Denis Kirwan Bernard.
