= Isidore Lynch =

Irish soldier

Isidore Lynch (7 June 1755 – 4 August 1841), was an Irish soldier.

Lynch was the son of Isidore Lynch and Judith Meade of Lynch Grove, County Galway, and a member of The Tribes of Galway. He was sent to France to be educated at Louis-le-Grand, Paris. He served in the 1770 war in India under one of his maternal uncles, colonel-commandant of Clare's Regiment. In the American War of Independence he served under Count d'Estaing, who commanded Lynch to carry an urgent order to another column at the siege of Savannah. To do so, Lynch chose to ride in a position that exposed him to fire from both the French and the English. Asked on his return why he chose such a route, he replied "Because it was the shortest."

Returning to France in 1783 he was appointed colonel of the second regiment of Walsh in the Irish Brigade, and was decorated with the Cross of Saint Louis. However, he took service in the army of the republic during the French Revolution and became lieutenant-general. He commanded the corps of infantry at the battle of Valmy in 1792.
