= Thomas William Moffett =

Irish scholar and educationalist (1820–1908)

Sir Thomas William Moffett (3 June 1820 – 6 July 1908) was an Irish scholar and educationalist, who served as president of Queen's College Galway.

Moffett was born at Castleknock, County Dublin, on 3 June 1820. He was educated at Trinity College Dublin, where he was a Berkeley Gold Medallist in Logic and Metaphysics, a gold medallist in Greek, and a prizeman in Divinity and Modern History. He graduated in 1843 as Senior Moderator in Ethics and Logic. He was awarded the degree of L.L.D. by Trinity College Dublin in 1852.

From May 1848, he held the position of headmaster of the Classical Department and professor of logic and belles lettres at the Royal Belfast Academical Institution. The first professors were appointed to the newly established Queen's Colleges at Belfast, Cork and Galway in 1849, and Moffett became the foundation professor of logic and metaphysics at the Galway College. In 1863, in addition to his original chair, Moffett took over the duties of Rev. Joseph O'Leary as professor of history and English literature, the offices being combined into a single chair of history, English literature and mental science. Moffett was to occupy this chair until his retirement from academia in 1897.

In 1870, Moffett succeeded William Lupton as registrar of Queen's College Galway. On the death of Edward Berwick in 1877, Moffett was appointed to succeed him as president of the college.

Moffett was known for his skill and power as an orator, and his ability to quote at will long extracts from the poems and sagas of antiquity, as well as more modern verse. Moffett was involved in the incorporation of the existing Literary and Scientific Society of Galway into the Queen's College as a debating society between 1852 and 1856. Moffett drafted the first rules for the governance within the college, and presided at the first meeting of the society which subsequently became the Literary and Debating Society.

Moffett never believed in the restriction of education and intellectual discourse to within the walls of a college. Between 1849 and 1856, he served as Barrington Lecturer for the Dublin Statistical Society (later known as the Statistical and Social Inquiry Society of Ireland). The Barrington Lectures, endowed by the Dublin businessman John Barrington from 1834, had as their objective the teaching of the principles of political economy to the lower classes in Ireland. Moffett delivered popular lectures in Ardee, Armagh, Belturbet, Clonmel, Coleraine, Derry, Downpatrick, Dublin, Dundalk, Dungannon, Galway, Holywood, Kilkenny, Lisburn, Lurgan, Trim and Waterford. He was also a stalwart of the Royal Galway Institution, an organisation set up to promote intellectual discourse among the people of Galway; he frequently delivered lectures to the Institution, and served as its president for many years up to the time of his death.

Moffett was knighted in 1896, in recognition of his many years of work for the cause of education in Ireland. He was awarded the degree of D.Litt. (honoris causa) by both the Queen's University and the University of Dublin. He was a member of the Senate of the Queen's University, and, on its foundation, he was appointed to the Senate of the Royal University of Ireland. In 1899, he was nominated the last High Sheriff of Galway Town.

Sir Thomas retired in 1897, having served as president of the college for twenty years, and subsequently moved to Dublin. After an illness of several weeks' duration, during which he was attended by his old student and lifelong friend Sir William Thomson, he died at his home there on 6 July 1908.

== Notes ==
Academic offices
Preceded by Edward Berwick	President of Queen's College Galway; 1877–1897	Succeeded by W. J. M. Starkie
