= Francis Martin (priest) =

Irish writer

Francis Martin (1652–1722) was an Irish Augustinian.

== Biography ==
He was born in Galway during the occupation of the town by the Cromwellian army, his family been one of the Tribes of Galway. He was educated in one of the secret schools in the city. In 1673 he began his studies for the priesthood in Louvain with the Augustinian order. Ordained there in 1680, he was the following year appointed Professor of Greek at the college. In the 1680s he was deeply involved in defending Papal Pronouncement against the Jansenists. He took his D.D. in 1688.

In 1691 he became Professor of Divinity at Mechelen, where he published two theses which led to his dismissal. However, he was re-appointed to his old post in Louvain, and in 1694 became its professor of Scripture. Subsequently, he was appointed Vice-President of the college, and in the same year he was made a Canon of St. Peter's.

In 1714, Martin wrote a letter to Edward Synge, the Protestant Archbishop of Tuam, in an effort to convert him to Catholicism. Archbishop Synge refused, but said of Francis Martin that he was a man who preserved something of freedom in his judgement [and] meant well at bottom.

Francis Martin died at Bruges on 4 October 1722, where he is buried in the grounds of St. John's Hospital.

== Note ==
Among his relations was Richard Martyn (c. 1600–1648), the noted Irish Confederate. Robert Martin of Dangan (1714–1794), studied at Louvain up to 1733, and was the father of Richard "Humanity Dick" Martin. He was also distantly related to F.X. Martin, (Francis Xaviar Martin), (1922 – 13 February 2000).

== Bibliography ==
- Refuatio Justificationis editae pro defendenda doctrini Henrici Denys, Leuven, 1700.
- Infallibilitas ecclesiæ in judicando quis sit sensus alicujus propositionis, (Leuven, Aegidius Denique, 1700). Accessible via KU Leuven Special Collections.
- L'etat Presant de la Faculte de Theologie de Louvain, Trevoux, 1701, pp. 247–2,250.
- Statera Quaestionis an ad fidem pertineat Sanctis in coelo notas esse mortalium preces, Leuven, 1710.
- Scutum fidei contra haereses hodiernas; seu Tillotsonianae concionis sub titulo; strena opportuna contra papisuum refutatio auctore ... Francisco Martin Iberno - Galviensi ... Louvain, Michael Zangrius, 1714, National Library of Ireland
- Avertissment touchant les pretendus Avis Salutaries, Louvain, 1719.
- motivum Jurvis pro Bullae Unigenitus Orthodixia, Louvain, 1720.
- Avis Salutaires a Messieurs les Protestans et Deliberaus de Louvain, Louvain.
- Via pacis, a thesis.

== See also ==
- The Tribes of Galway
