= Margaret Athy =

Irish religious patron

Margaret Athy (fl. 1508) was an Irish religious patron.

Margaret Athy was a member of The Tribes of Galway and is notable for been one of the few recorded female founders of religious houses in medieval Connacht. In 1508, while her husband Stephen Lynch (son of Dominick Dubh Lynch) was trading in Spain, she founded the Augustinian Friary of Forthill, overlooking the town and Galway Bay. In the 17th century it was turned into a garrison and the friars expelled. It was successfully besieged in June 1643 and by the 1680s was razed to the ground. The present cemetery of Forthill exists upon the site.

Other work thought to have been funded by Margaret was Lynch's Aisle, the tower and chapel of Our Lady, which is known to have been undertaken by her husband, and their son Nicholas Lynch.

Margaret Athy later made a pilgrimage to Santiago de Compostela and from there intended to visit the Holy Land but was prevented by illness.

== See also ==
- History of Galway
- Mayors of Galway
- The Tribes of Galway
