= Peter Martin (STP) =

Irish Dominican preacher

Peter Martin (STP) was an Irish preacher and Master of Sacred Theology, who died 1645.

Martin was born in the town of Galway, Ireland, and by 1615 had already been a student at St. Patrick's College in Lisbon. He joined the Dominican Order and was in that year studying at Salamanca. By 1622 he had returned to Ireland where he enjoyed much success as preacher. In 1626 he was proposed as lector primarius et moderator studiorum of a proposed Dominican school at Galway. He was prior of that community in July 1631.

In the late 1630s he was one of a number of Connacht Dominicans proposed as candidates for various offices, such as Achonry, Armagh and Clonfert. Material from the time describes him as for the past fifteen years eminent at Galway both for preaching and for his teaching of philosophy, rhetoric and letters. He died at Galway in 1645.

== See also ==
- The Tribes of Galway
