= Galway Vindicator =

The Galway Vindicator was a newspaper which operated in Galway, Ireland from 10 July 1841 to 4 November 1899. It was one of several newspapers founded to help advance the agenda of Daniel O'Connell and was noted for its daily coverage of the effects of the Great Famine. The full title was 'The Galway Vindicator, and Connaught Advertiser', and a full run of the newspaper from 1841 to 1899 is available in the British Library Newspaper Collection, with some issues digitised in the British Newspaper Archive.
