= Galway Archaeological and Historical Society =

Historical preservation group in Ireland

The Galway Archaeological and Historical Society was founded on 21 March 1900. It promotes historical preservation, as well as the study of the archaeology and history of the west of Ireland.

As of January 2002, the Society had published 53 consecutive volumes of the Journal of the Galway Archaeological and Historical Society since the first was published in 2000. Back issues of JGAHS are available through the academic database JSTOR.

The Society also runs a lecture series in Galway City and is involved in lobbying national and local authorities in relation to heritage matters relating to the City and County of Galway. In 1999, the society complained that renovation work carried out on Ballindooley Castle, was "an appalling intrusion on the landscape, and one step too far". That year, it also convinced the Galway Corporation to reconsider its decision allowing the demolition of Prairie House, a seaside boarding house built in the late 18th or early 19th century.

== See also ==
- List of historical societies in Ireland
