= Edward Kirwan =

English clergyman, author, and cricketer

Edward Dominick Geoffrey Martin Kirwan (5 August 1814 – 27 June 1890) was an English clergyman, author and cricketer who played in first-class cricket matches for Cambridge University between 1834 and 1837. He was born in Cheltenham, Gloucestershire and died at Dover, Kent.

As a cricketer, Kirwan played in six Cambridge matches as a batsman; there is no record that he bowled. He was not notably successful in any of his first-class matches and his highest score in nine innings was just 15; he was not selected for the University Match against Oxford University in any of his Cambridge seasons. Kirwan's younger brother, John, was very much more successful in his cricket career and played alongside him in a few Cambridge games from 1836. In the first of the matches in which both Kirwans appeared, John Kirwan took 15 wickets against Cambridge Town Club.

== Career outside cricket ==
Educated at Eton College and King's College, Cambridge, Kirwan was a Fellow of King's from 1837 to 1854. He was ordained as a Church of England priest after graduation and from 1854 to 1876 he was vicar of Wootton Wawen in Warwickshire. He retired to Boulogne-sur-Mer, France. He translated Spanish historical works into English.
