= High Sheriff of Galway Town =

Official in Ireland (1841 to 1899)

The High Sheriff of Galway Town was the Sovereign's judicial representative in the county of the Town of Galway. Initially an office for lifetime, assigned by the Sovereign, the role of High Sheriff became annually appointed from the Provisions of Oxford in 1258. Besides the judicial importance of the role, it had ceremonial and administrative functions and executed High Court Writs.

== History ==
The first (High) Shrievalties were established before the Norman Conquest in 1066, dating back to Saxon times. In 1908, an Order in Council made the Lord-Lieutenant the Sovereign's prime representative in the counties of the United Kingdom and reduced the precedence of the High Sheriff's role. Despite that, the office-holder retained their responsibilities for the preservation of law and order in a county.

The first High Sheriff of the town of Galway was appointed in 1841 and the last one in 1899.

== Victoria, 1841–1899 ==
- 1841: Martin Morris
- 1843: Nicholas Lynch
- 1845: Patrick Marcus Lynch
- 1848: T A. Joyce of Rahasau, Loughrea.
- 1849: Michael Morris
- 1850: Thomas Moore Persse
- 1851: Mark Anthony Lynch
- 1856: Ambrose Rush
- 1857: Peter Sarsfield Comyn
- 1858: John Wilson Lynch of Duras and Renmore.
- 1860: George Morris
- 1862: Henry Hodgsen
- 1867: Pierce John Joyce
- 1868: Henry Sadleir Persse
- 1868: Francis Comyn of Woodstock
- 1870: Marcus Lynch, JP of Barna House.
- 1872: Sir Valentine Blake, 14th Bt.
- 1874: Charles French Blake-Forster
- 1878: Francis O'Donnellan Blake-Forster
- 1881: Rickard Blake.
- 1882: Robert William Waithman.
- 1884: Thomas G.P. Halett.
- 1885: Walter Martin Blake.
- 1886: Llewellyn Blake.
- 1887: Arthur Henry Courtenay.
- 1888: William Henry Persse.
- 1890: De Burgh Fitzpatrick Persse.
- 1892: Robert French Blake.
- 1893: John Joseph Chevers.
- 1898: Sir William Henry Mahon, 5th Baronet of Castlebar, Ahascragh.
- 1899: Thomas William Moffett.
