= Stephen Lynch (Franciscan) =

Stephen Lynch was a member of the Order of Saint Francis.

Born in Galway sometime in the first half of the 17th century, he studied in Rome and became a Franciscan. He returned to Ireland, perhaps in the 1640s, and was listed as one of the friars banished from the Franciscan Convent of Galway in 1652. His subsequent fate is unknown.

He was also known as Stephanus a Galvia.

== See also ==
- The Tribes of Galway

== Bibliography ==
- Promptuarium Scotisticum, i, ii, Rome.
