= John Óge Kirwan =

Former mayor of Galway

John Óge Kirwan (a.k.a. Jhonock Kirwan), fl. 1530–1531, was a former Mayor of Galway.

The Ó Ciardhubháin family moved from Dunmore, County Galway to Galway town in the 1480s following a land dispute with Baron Athenry. The then head of the family was William Ó Ciardhubháin, whose eldest son, Thomas, became Mayor in 1534, while his second son, Patrick, became first Warden of Galway.

John Óge's relationship to these men is unknown, but he was the first member of the family to attain significant political office in the Anglo-Irish town of Galway.

Civic offices
Preceded by Richard Gare Lynch	Mayor of Galway; 1530–1531	Succeeded by James Skerrett
