= John Skerrett (mayor) =

Irish civic leader

John Skerrett (Mayor) was the seventh Mayor of Galway, serving 1491–1492. Skerrett was a member of one of The Tribes of Galway, descended from a Richard Huskard. John Skerrett was elected Provost of Galway in 1480. A copy of his mayoralty seal survives, and was illustrated in volume one of Blake Family Records by Martin J. Blake.

Civic offices
Preceded by Robuck Lynch	Mayor of Galway; 1491–1492	Succeeded by Thomas Lynch (Mayor)
