= Magdalen Kirwan =

Irish nun (c. 1830–1906)

Magdalen Kirwan (c. 1830 - February 1906) was an Irish nun and member of the Sisters of Mercy and manager of Goldenbridge penal refuge.

== Background ==
Kirwan was born at Tobar Caoch (the Blindwell), near Kilconly, Tuam, sometime around 1830. Her grandfather was Martin Kirwan of the Blindwell, once High Sheriff of Galway; his eldest child - one of three sons and two daughters, was Martin Kirwan, who in 1801 married Mary Burke of Glinsk Castle, County Galway. Their children were Martin Staunton Kirwan (1802–61), James (died 30 May 1865), Thomas Staunton of the Blindwell (alive 1874?), William (died 15 June 1864), Catherine (died 13 January 1866) and Charlotte Margaret, who took the name Magdalen in religion.

== Profession and Goldenbridge ==
Charlotte entered the Mercy Convent on Dublin's Baggot Street on 24 August 1851, and was professed there in September 1854. She took the name Magdalen.

Her organisation skills were recognised, and within some eighteen months Kirwan was put in charge of a refuge for women who had served prison sentences and who needed rehabilitation before joining society. This was Goldenbridge, opened in 1856. Sr. Teresa Delaney writes that:

It was described as being very unprisonlike in appearance and ... was a halfway house where women serving penal servitude spent the final part of their sentences. Compared to the prison regime the refuge appears to have been fairly relaxed. The person in charge, Sr. Magdalen Kirwan, was known in the usage of the time as Mrs. Kirwan. The success of the institution can be attributed to her, for her manner was described as gentle and winning, yet with a decisive and energetic will to "exercise a powerful influence on those whom she had to control". Someone praised "her frank, motherly nature, active mind and acute intellect, which helped her to deal with a class to whom deception and idleness have become second nature."

The main source of income was the laundry run by the sisters.

By 1884 fully one thousand, two hundred and thirty-two women had passed through Goldenbridge. According to Kirwan, three-quarters of them turned out well. She recounted that many had emigrated, and that she had received many letters and photographs from them, but stated " ... when they marry I drop the correspondence. The moment a woman becomes Mrs. So and So I say 'you must not write to me now' - I drop the correspondence at once." She encouraged the women to tell future husbands of their backgrounds, and in some cases, some requested that she do it for them.

Sr. Magdalen Kirwan died at Goldenbridge in February 1906 and is buried in the sister's cemetery.

== The Phoenix Park Murders ==
On 6 May 1882 in the Phoenix Park, Dublin, Lord Frederick Cavendish and Thomas Henry Burke (newly appointed Chief Secretary for Ireland, and Burke was the Permanent Undersecretary, respectively) were stabbed to death by members of the Irish National Invincibles. Burke was Kirwan's first cousin. One of those arrested, tried and sentenced to death, Joe Brady, could not bring himself to forgive the informer, though he did forgive the judge, jury, jailers and police for doing their job.

The prison chaplain enslisted the aid of Sr. Magdalen, though it is unknown if he was aware of her relationship with Burke. Up to the time of her last visit on 13 May 1883 - the day before Brady's execution - her efforts to guide him to forgiveness had failed. As she left, she turned at the door and addressed him:

The man you so barbarously killed without a moment's warning, and sent before the judgement of God, was a dear cousin of mine, and I came to tell you I have freely forgiven you and the others who took part in the deed, and so, if I forgive, why not you forgive the informers? Although they swore away your life they did not kill you. You were given plenty of time to repent, so will you now grant my request and forgive them?

Brady became agitated, proclaiming that It is hard. However, after a pause, he stated that he forgave them. His last wish was that Sr. Magdalen should meet his mother and console her following his execution the next morning.

After her death, John Spencer, 5th Earl Spencer, erected at his own expense a window memorial in memory of Kirwan in the chapel of the Dominicans at Dominick Street, Dublin.
