= John William Kirwan =

Irish Roman Catholic priest

John William Kirwan (died 29 December 1849) was the first President of Queen's College, Galway. Kirwan was a member of one of The Tribes of Galway, and was noted by contemporaries as an outstanding preacher.

== Biography ==
He was appointed parish priest of Kilcummin (Oughterard in 1827, from about which time he had been canvassing for office in a proposed Queen's College for Galway. This was a highly emotive issue in Ireland, as it was felt that the Catholic population could not, and should not, propagate a system of education not endorsed by their clergy.

However, when the bill was eventually passed in 1845, Kirwin immediately travelled to London to argue his case with Sir Robert Peel, who was sufficiently impressed to nominate him. To the shock of much of his community and friends, he was appointed President in October or November 1845. While there was support, it was outweighed by the venom of his critics. Nevertheless, he began with the chairman of the board of works and the commissioner for buildings to inspect sites. A site was selected outside the town, between the Corrib and the Newcastle road; once purchased, construction began.

Meanwhile, personal attacks continued, such as those from the editor of the Catholic weekly, The Tablet, while the Holy See still maintained its opposition to the colleges. At one point in late 1848 Kirwan was distressed enough by events to offer his resignation, but was dissuaded, apparently by the then Archbishop of Armagh, William Crolly, who was a staunch supporter of the scheme.

Nevertheless, the strain took a toll on his health, and he was obliged to spend some months out of the public eye. Problems had emerged with the College's construction, as it became apparent that he would not be completed in time for the formal opening. Matters turned tragic on 22 October 1849 when the contractor, Francis Burke, killed himself in Kirwan's home in Salthill.

Nevertheless, the College opened on 30 October 1849. But Kirwan's precarious health worsened, and he died on 24 December 1849. He was buried in the parish church of Oughterard. A portrait of Kirwan hangs in the board-room of the National University of Ireland, Galway.
