= Anthony Lynch (Dominican) =

Anthony Lynch(c. 1576-after 1636), STM OP, was an Irish born priest, who joined Dominican order and spent eight years as a slave,

Lynch was born in the town of Galway, Ireland, a son of Nicholas Lynch and Juliana Martin. He spent some years in trade before leaving for Lisbon where he studied humanities at St. Patrick's College, Lisbon. There, he received his subdiaconate in 1599 and in 1602 moved to the Irish College at Salamanca. He joined the Dominican Order at Lisbon in September 1606, age thirty-one.

His presence was reported in Galway c. 1611 by a spy. In 1615 he was captured and enslaved by Barbary corsairs and was not ransomed until 1623, been freed by Nicholas Lynch.

He was recommended as a candidate for Archbishop of Armagh (1626) and Bishop of Achonry (1636).

== See also ==
- Richard Joyce, slave and 'creator' of the Claddagh ring
