= Joseph W. Kirwan =

Irish clergyman and educator (1796–1849)

Joseph William Kirwan (1796 – 24 December 1849) was an Irish clergyman and educationalist, who served as the first president of Queen's College Galway.

Kirwan was born in Galway in 1796. He entered the National Seminary at St Patrick's College, Maynooth, in 1817, and was ordained to the Roman Catholic priesthood in 1822, having been awarded the degree of Doctor of Divinity (D.D.). Returning to his native Diocese of Galway, he was appointed Parish Priest of Oughterard in 1827, where he initiated construction of a new parish church. He was considered one of the leading candidates for appointment as Bishop of Galway when that office became vacant in 1845.

Kirwan was appointed President of Queen's College Galway on the foundation of the college in December 1845. The college, one of three founded at Belfast, Cork and Galway to provide non-denominational university education in Ireland as an alternative to the Church of Ireland's Trinity College in Dublin, was not regarded with favour by a large number of prominent Catholics, among them many members of the Catholic hierarchy, who continued to press for the foundation of a specifically Catholic university. The institutions became known as the 'Godless Colleges', and Kirwan's position came under severe pressure from several leading bishops, including his own metropolitan bishop, John MacHale, the Archbishop of Tuam. He remained committed to the college, however, and despite failing health presided over its official opening on 30 October 1849.

Kirwan died on 24 December 1849.

== See also ==
- William Ó Ciardhubháin

Academic offices
New office	President of Queen's College Galway; 1845–1849	Succeeded by Edward Berwick
