= James Skerrett =

James Skerrett, fl. 1513–1532, Mayor of Galway.

Skerrett was a descendant of Richard Huskard, and seems to have served two consecutive terms. He had served on the corporation as bailiff in 1513. Among the statues passed while he was Mayor was one denying permission for anyone to leave the town after the town gates were closed.

20th-century Irish writer Liam O'Flaherty (1896–1984) used the surname as the title character for one of his novels.

Civic offices
Preceded by John Óge Kirwan	Mayor of Galway; 1531–1533	Succeeded by Richard Blake
