= Richard Kirwan =

Irish geologist and chemist (1733–1812)

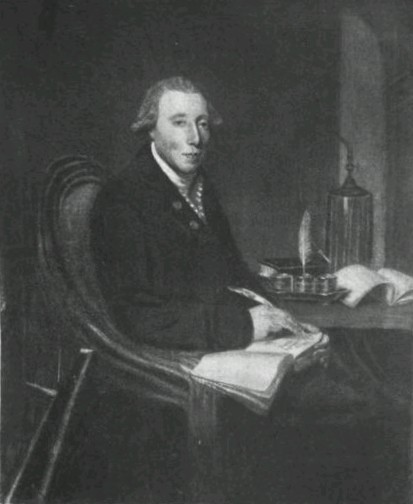
- Born: 1 August 1733; Cregg Castle, Annaghdown, County Galway, Ireland
- Died: 22 June 1812 (aged 78); Dublin
- Known for: Phlogiston
- Scientific career
- Fields: Chemistry

Richard Kirwan, LL.D, FRS, FRSE MRIA (1 August 1733 – 22 June 1812) was an Irish geologist and chemist of the United Kingdom of Great Britain and Ireland. He was one of the last supporters of the theory of phlogiston.

Kirwan was active in the fields of chemistry, meteorology, and geology. He was widely known in his day, corresponding and meeting with Lavoisier, Black, Priestley, and Cavendish.

== Life and work ==
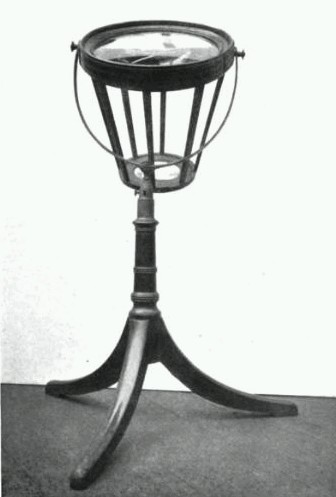
A burning glass owned by Richard Kirwan

Richard Kirwan was born at Cregg Castle, County Galway, the second son of Martin Kirwan of Cregg (d. 1741), and his wife, Mary French (d. 1751). He was a descendant of William Ó Ciardhubháin and a member of The Tribes of Galway. Part of his early life was spent abroad, and in 1754 he entered the Jesuit novitiate either at St Omer or at Hesdin, but returned to Ireland in the following year when he succeeded to the family estates through the death of his brother in a duel. Kirwan married "Miss Blake" in 1757, but his wife only lived eight more years. The couple had two daughters, Maria Theresa and Eliza.

In 1766, having conformed to the established religion (Church of Ireland) two years previously, Kirwan was called to the Irish Bar, but in 1768 abandoned practice in favour of scientific pursuits. During the next nineteen years, he resided chiefly in London, enjoying the society of the scientific men living there and corresponding with many savants on the continent of Europe, as his wide knowledge of languages enabled him to do with ease. His experiments on the specific gravities and attractive powers of various saline substances formed a substantial contribution to the methods of analytical chemistry and in 1782 gained him the Copley medal from the Royal Society, of which he was elected a fellow in 1780. In 1784, he was engaged in a controversy with Henry Cavendish in regard to the latter's experiments about air. He was elected a foreign member of the Royal Swedish Academy of Sciences in 1784 and a member of the American Philosophical Society in 1786.

In 1787, Kirwan moved to Dublin, where, in 1799, he became president of the Royal Irish Academy until his death. To its proceedings, he contributed some thirty-eight memoirs dealing with meteorology, pure and applied chemistry, geology, magnetism and philology. One of these, on the primitive state of the globe and its subsequent catastrophe, involved him in a lively dispute with the upholders of the Huttonian theory. His geological work was marred by an implicit belief in the universal deluge and through finding fossils associated with the trap rocks near Portrush that he maintained basalt was of aqueous origin.

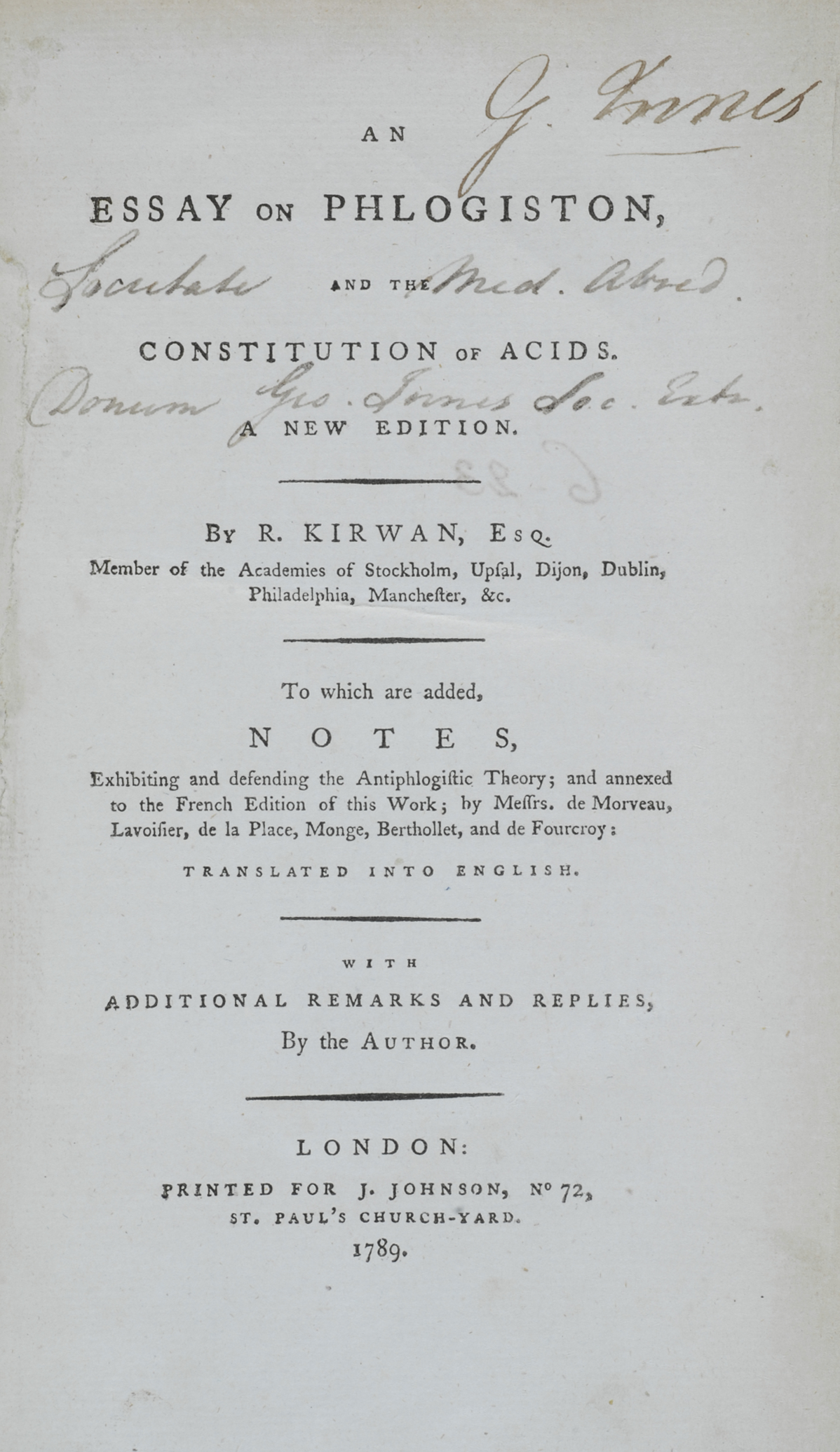
An essay on phlogiston, 1789 edition

Kirwan was one of the last supporters in Britain and Ireland of the theory of phlogiston, for which he contended in his Essay on Phlogiston and the Constitution of Acids (1787), identifying phlogiston with hydrogen. This work, translated by Marie-Anne Pierette Paulze, was published in French with critical notes by Lavoisier and some of his associates. Kirwan attempted to refute their arguments, but they proved too strong for him, and he acknowledged himself a convert in 1791.

There is evidence to suggest that Kirwan was a member of the Society of the United Irishmen, a revolutionary republican organisation in 18th century Ireland. The United Irishmen were founded as a reformist club by a group of Irish radical Protestants and Presbyterians in 1791, influenced by the American and French revolutions. Gradually becoming more militant, the Society advocated for Catholic emancipation and the overthrow in Ireland of British rule. This movement culminated in the defeat of the United Irishmen in the 1798 Rebellion and the Act of Union.

At the time of the Union, Kirwan refused a baronetcy, died in Dublin in June 1812, and was buried there in St. George's Church, Lower Temple Street. Kirwan's library was sold at auction in Dublin by Thomas Jones on 12 April 1813 (and following days); a copy of the catalogue is held at Cambridge University Library (shelfmark Munby.c.159(12)).

== Eccentricities ==
Various stories are told of Kirwan's eccentricities as well as of his conversational powers. It is said that flies "were his especial aversion; he kept a pet eagle, and was attended by six large dogs." Kirwan disliked flies and paid his servants for each time they were killed. He also disliked late visitors and had his door-knocker removed each evening at seven o'clock.

Kirwan suffered from dysphagia and always dined alone. He lived on an exclusive diet of ham and milk. The ham was cooked on Sunday and reheated for the rest of the week. Kirwan was obsessed with avoiding a cold. He heated his living room all year round with a fire and always wore an overcoat indoors.

== Honours and activities ==
- Fellow of the Royal Society (1780)
- Copley Medal (1782)
- Foreign Honorary Member of the American Academy of Arts and Sciences (1789)
- Royal Irish Academy (1799–1812) – President
- Wernerian Natural History Society of Edinburgh (1808) – honorary founding member

== Books ==
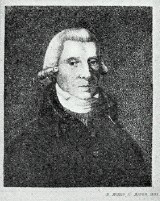
Richard Kirwan – Portrait by Hugh Douglas Hamilton

- Elements of Mineralogy (1784)
- Essay on Phlogiston and the Constitution of Acids (1787)
- An Estimate of the Temperature of Different Latitudes (1787)
- Essay of the Analysis of Mineral Waters (1799)
- Geological Essays (1799)
- The Manures Most Advantageously Applicable to the Various Sorts of Soils (1796; sixth edition in 1806)
- Logick (1807)
- Metaphysical Essays (1809)
- An Essay on Human Happiness (1810)
