= St. Nicholas' Collegiate Church =

Church of Ireland church in Galway

St. Nicholas Collegiate Church
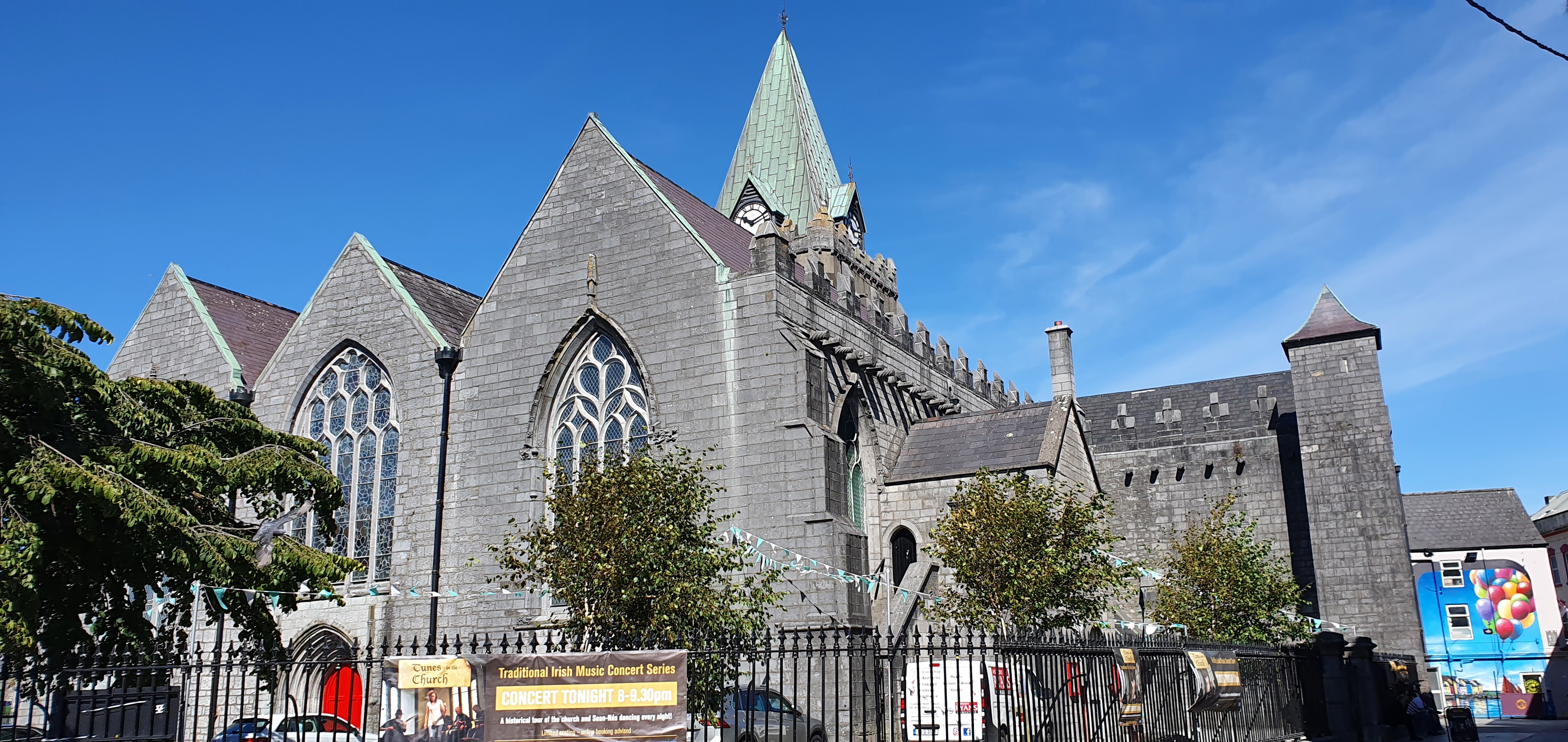
- St. Nicholas Collegiate Church
- St. Nicholas Collegiate Church
- 53.27277°N 9.05366°W
- Location: Galway
- Country: Ireland
- Denomination: Church of Ireland
- Previous denomination: Roman Catholic
- Website: www.stnicholas.ie

History
- Dedication: Saint Nicholas

Administration
- Province: Dublin
- Diocese: Tuam, Limerick and Killaloe
- Parish: Galway

Clergy
- Rector: Lynda Peilow

The Collegiate Church of St. Nicholas (Irish: Eaglais Choláisteach San Nioclás) is a medieval church building in Galway, Ireland,. It is a collegiate church and the parish church of St. Nicholas Church of Ireland parish, which covers Galway City. It was founded in 1320 and dedicated to Saint Nicholas of Myra, the patron saint of seafarers, in recognition of Galway's status as a port. The monumental work of Irish genealogy, the Leabhar na nGenealach was produced here in 1650 by Duḃaltaċ MacḞirḃisiġ (Dubhaltach MacFhirbhisigh).

== Wardenship of Galway ==
The church was raised to the status of a collegiate church by letters under the seal of Donatus Ó Muireadhaigh, the Archbishop of Tuam, on 28 September 1484, the same year in which Galway was granted a royal charter and given mayoral status. The granting of collegiate status was confirmed on 8 September 1485 by a papal bull issued by Pope Innocent VIII (Super Dominicum Gregem). Both events were commemorated in the Galway quincentennial year, 1984.

The granting of collegiate status in 1484 required that the City of Galway and some surrounding parishes be severed from the Archdiocese of Tuam. The priests of the city were constituted into a College of Vicars, the senior of whom was called the warden. The warden, a position and title unique in Irish ecclesiastical history, was the spiritual leader of the city and was entitled to wear attire traditionally associated with a bishop (such as the mitre and crosier), while not having the power of ordination. The warden and eight assisting vicars choral were elected every year in August by the mayor and members of the Corporation (city council) as then constituted. The warden presented himself for election every year; there was to be an election for the post of vicar only when there was a vacancy. The vicars were elected from the secular clergy, for life. The clergy were to be learned, virtuous and well-bred, and were to observe the English Rite and custom in the Divine Service.

At first, only the city and the parish of Claregalway constituted the wardenship. However, by the end of the century, the parishes of Oranmore and Maree, Oughterard, Rahoon, Moycullen and Skryne were included. The Archbishop of Tuam retained some vaguely defined visitation rights. The Protestant Reformation saw the creation of a second Anglican Wardenship that enjoyed the sponsorship of the government and an underground Roman Catholic Wardenship. The Anglican wardenship, however, never enjoyed popular support. These Wardenships continued until the early 19th century. The Anglican Wardenship was discontinued by the Church of Ireland and replaced by the parish of Galway under the care of a rector, while the Roman Catholic Wardenship was discontinued by the Holy See and the city and a large area of its hinterland was reconstituted as the Diocese of Galway.

== Historical notes ==
Over the centuries St. Nicholas's has played a central role in the life of the city. For many years the triennial elections of the mayor and corporation (city council) were held within its walls. Only male members of fourteen select Galway families, known as the Tribes of Galway, had suffrage.

Local legend states that Christopher Columbus worshipped there when he visited the city in 1477.

== Modern times ==
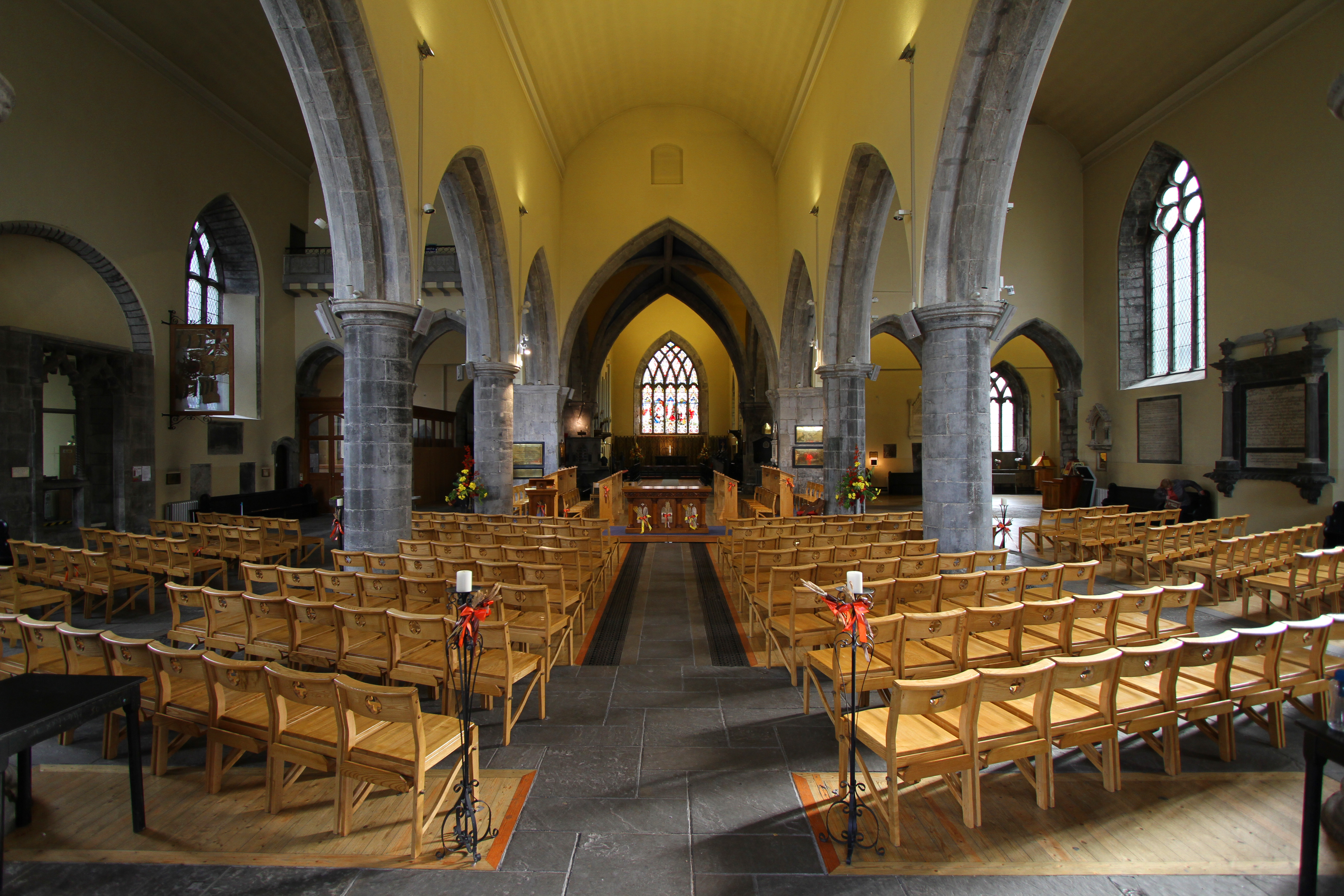
Nave looking toward the chancel

In September 2002 the Collegiate Church attracted controversy when it was the scene of the first public blessing for a same-sex couple in an Irish church. The Avowing Friendship service for a lesbian couple, it was reported, was conducted by the rector, the Reverend Patrick Towers, in September 2002. The Bishop of Tuam, Richard Henderson, prohibited any further services of this kind, and Towers agreed to abide by this ruling.

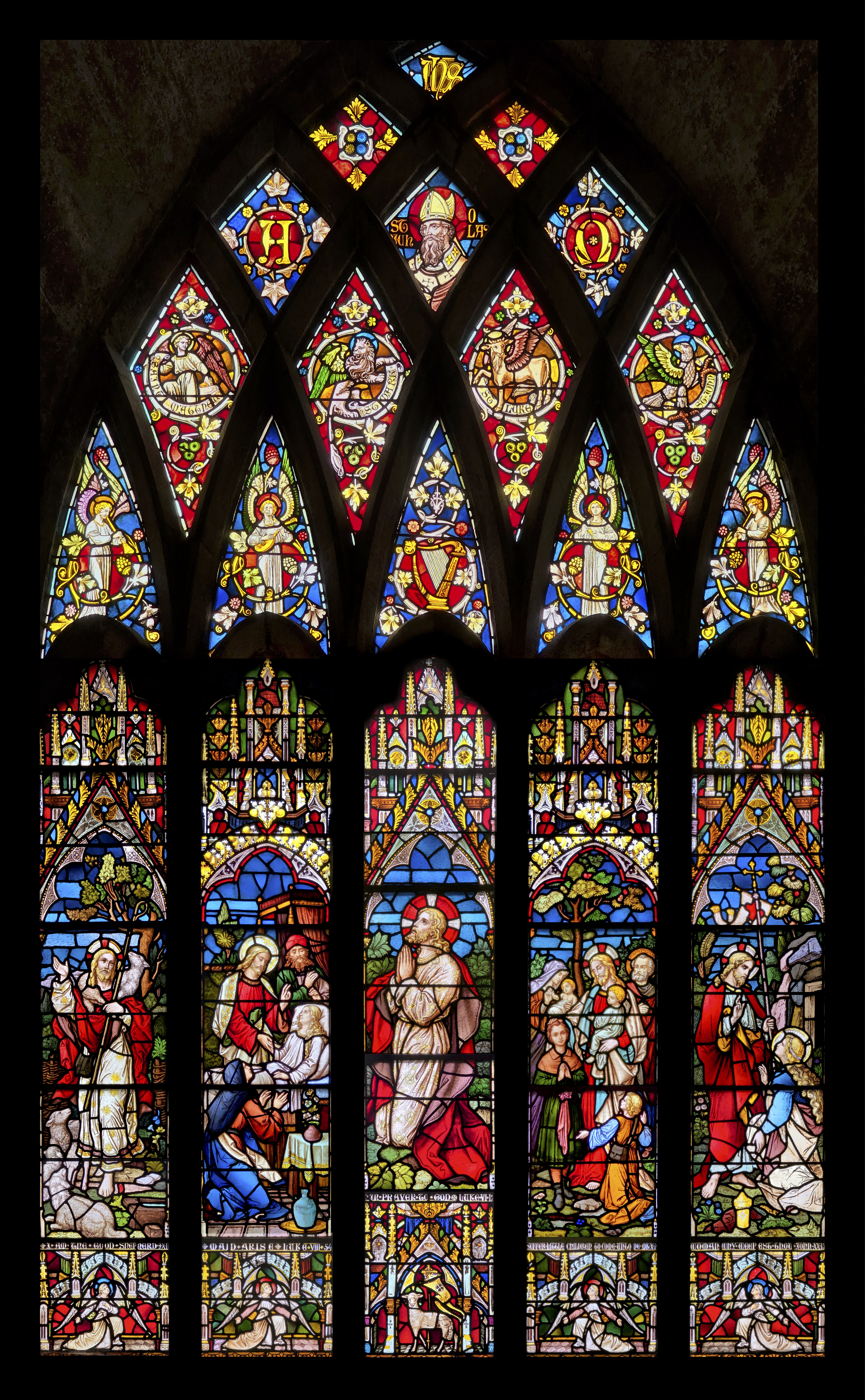
Chancel window with stained glass by Franz Mayer

The church was used for Catholic Mass by the congregation of St Augustine's Church during the refurbishment of their church between April and December 2005. This generous act cemented good local relations between the Church of Ireland and the Roman Catholic Church. In gratitude for this, the parishioners of St Augustine's presented the Collegiate Church with a processional cross. The church is regularly used for worship by the Romanian and Russian Orthodox Churches, and the Malankara Mar Thoma Syrian Church.

The Reverend Patrick Towers was succeeded in July 2009 by Archdeacon Gary Hastings as Rector of St. Nicholas. Archdeacon Hastings is a well-known Irish traditional flute player, and author of With Fife and Drum, a study of the Orange Lambeg and fifing traditions of Ulster. He has played with the Chieftains, and plays with Fr. Séamus Quinn on the CD Slán le Loch Éirne. Hastings was succeeded in September 2018 by the Very Rev Lynda Peilow, the first woman to serve as Rector.

Every year on the Sunday before Christmas, the church holds the Civic Carol Service of Nine Lessons and Carols attended by the Mayor and City Council in full ceremonial robes and accompanied by the symbols of mayoral dignity - the Great Mace and Civic Sword. The service concludes with the solemn blessing of the city by the assembled clergy of many denominations including the Anglican Bishop of Tuam and the RC Bishop of Galway.

== Literature ==
- J. F. Berry: The Story of St. Nicholas' Collegiate Church, Galway. Galway 1912.
- Harold Leask: The Collegiate Church of St. Nicholas, Galway. Galway 1936.
  - reprinted The Collegiate Church of St. Nicholas, Galway, Galway 1962.
- Adrian Martyn, The Tribes of Galway 1124-1642, Galway 2016.
