= Tribes of Galway =

Urban lineages from Galway, Ireland

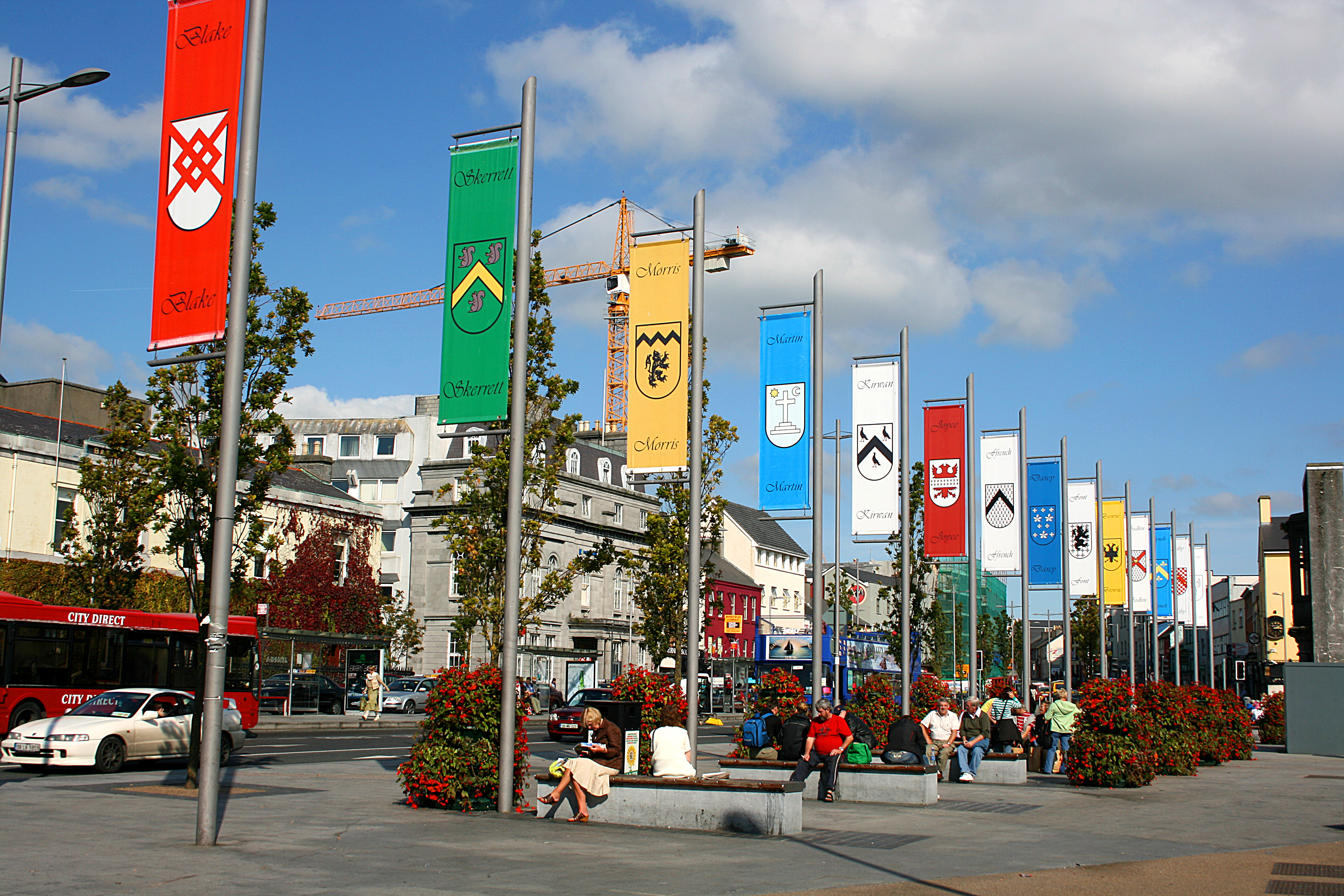
A display of the 14 tribal banners of arms in Eyre Square, Galway

The Tribes of Galway (Irish: Treibheanna na Gaillimhe) were 14 merchant families who dominated the political, commercial and social life of the city of Galway in western Ireland between the mid-13th and late 19th centuries. They were the families of Athy, Blake, Bodkin, Browne, Darcy/D’Arcy, Deane, Font, French, Joyce, Kirwan, Lynch, Martin, Morris and Skerritt or Skerrett. Of the 14 families, 12 were of Anglo Norman origin, while two—the Darcy (Ó Dorchaí) and Kirwan (Ó Ciardhubháin) families—were Normanised Irish Gaels.

== History ==
The Tribes were merchant families who prospered from trade with continental Europe. They dominated Galway's municipal government during the medieval and early modern eras.

The Tribes distinguished themselves from the Gaelic peoples who lived in the hinterland of the city. Many of these families spoke Irish as a second or even first language. However, the feared suppression of their common faith joined both groups together as Irish Catholics after the Irish Rebellion of 1641. During the Irish Confederate Wars (1641–1653), Galway took the side of the Confederate Catholics. Following the Cromwellian conquest of Ireland, the English government punished the Tribes. Galway was besieged and after it surrendered in April 1652, the Tribes had to face the confiscation of their property by the New Model Army.

The Tribes lost much of their power within Galway city after English Parliamentarians took over the Galway Corporation in 1654. Cromwell's forces referred to them by the derogatory name, "The Tribes of Galway", which the families later adopted as a mark of defiance.

Galway's urban elite gained a restoration of some of their power during the reign of the King Charles II (1660–1685) and his successor James II. However, Jacobite defeat in the War of the Two Kings (1689–91), marked the end of the Tribes' once overwhelming political influence on the life of the city. Power passed to the small Protestant population. Garrison members of the Tribes who owned land in Galway and Mayo were protected by the advantageous surrender provisions that were signed on 22 July 1691.

== Notable members ==
=== Athy ===
- John Athy (fl. 1426–1438), Sovereign of Galway
- Margaret Athy (fl. 1508), founder of the Augustinian Friary of Forthill

=== Blake ===
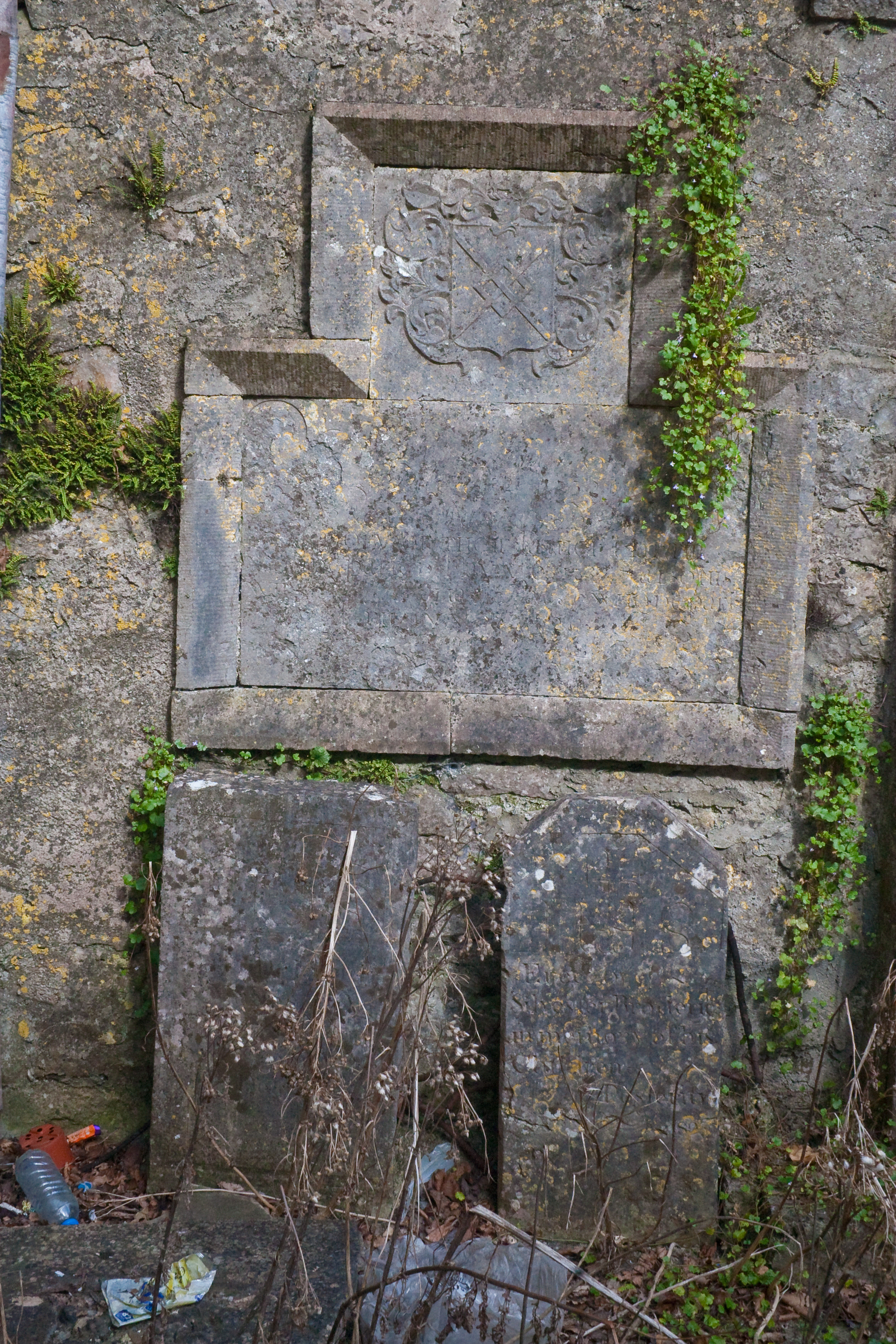
Blake family memorial plaque, depicting the coat of arms, at the north wall of the choir at Loughrea Priory

- John Blake fitz William, third Mayor of Galway, 1487–1488
- Captain James "Spanish" Blake, fl. 1588–1635, spy and purported assassin of Red Hugh O'Donnell
- Joaquín Blake y Joyes, (1759–1827), Spanish military officer who served with distinction in the French Revolutionary and Peninsular wars

=== Bodkin ===
- John Bodkin fitz Richard, Mayor of Galway, 1518–19
- Dominick Dáll Bodkin, mass murderer, executed 8 October 1740
- Manuel Antonio Flórez Maldonado Martínez Ángulo y Bodquín, admiral in the Spanish Navy and viceroy of New Granada (1776–1781) and New Spain (1787–1789)
- John Bodkin (died 1710), Roman Catholic Warden of Galway. After his death, his body was said to have been the subject of a miracle because it was thought to have not decayed
- Michael Bodkin (c. 1888–1900), inspiration for Michael Furey in James Joyce's short story "The Dead"

=== Browne ===
- Geoffrey Browne (died 1668), Irish Confederate lawyer and politician
- Mary Bonaventure Browne (before 1610 – after 1670), Poor Clare and historian,
- John Browne, 1st Marquess of Sligo
- Garech Browne (1939–2018), patron of Irish arts and one-time manager of The Chieftains

=== Darcy/D’Arcy (Ó Dorchaidhe) ===
- James Riabhach Darcy, Mayor of Galway, 1602–1603
- Patrick Darcy (1598–1668), Catholic Confederate and lawyer who wrote the constitution of Confederate Ireland
- Patrick Darcy (1725–1779), mathematician and soldier

=== Deane ===
- Edmond Deane, 18th Mayor of Galway, 1502–1504

=== Font (ffont) ===
- Geoffrey Font (1709–1814), centenarian

=== French (ffrench) ===
- Christopher French, (fl. c. 1650–c.1713), theologian
- Seán an tSalainn French (1489–1546), Mayor of Galway, 1538–1539
- Arthur French, 1st Baron de Freyne
- Patricio French (b. 1742–?) Spanish nobleman, merchant and politician
- Conrad O'Brien-ffrench (1893–1986), artist and secret agent

=== Joyce ===
- Henry Joyce, Mayor of Galway, 1542–1543
- Richard Joyce (c. 1660 – c. 1737), creator of the Claddagh ring
- Patrick Weston Joyce (1827 – November 1914) historian, writer, and music collector

=== Kirwan (Ó Ciardhubháin) ===
- William Ó Ciardhubháin, founder of the merchant family
- Dominick Kirwin (fl. 1642–1653?), Irish Confederate
- Joseph W. Kirwan (1796–1849), first president of Queen's College, Galway
- Magdalen Kirwan (c. 1830–1906), Sister of Mercy and manager of St. Vincent's Industrial School, Goldenbridge
- Richard Kirwan (1733–1812), president of the Royal Irish Academy
- Risteárd Buidhe Kirwan (1708–1779), soldier and duellist
- Sarah Annette Kirwan (d. 1913), first wife of Sir Edward Carson, Ulster Unionist leader
- Laurence P. Kirwan (1907–1999), KCMG, Egyptologist and archeologist; head of Royal Geographical Society
- James Kerwin (b. 1973), Irish-American film director

=== Lynch ===
- Anthony Lynch (c. 1576 – after 1636), Dominican and Barbary captive
- Christopher Lynch (fl. 1601–1604), Mayor of Galway
- Dominick Dubh Lynch (died 1508), second Mayor of Galway
- Germyn Lynch (fl. 1441–1483), merchant and entrepreneur
- Isidore Lynch (1755–1841), soldier
- Jean-Baptiste Lynch (1749–1835), Mayor of Bordeaux and a peer of France
- John Lynch (1599?–1677?), historian and Archdeacon of Tuam
- Maire Lynch (fl. 1547), Countess of Clanricarde
- Patrick Lynch (Argentina) (1715–1789) ancestor of Che Guevara
- Thomas Kerr Lynch (1818–91), explorer

=== Martin (Ó Máirtín) ===
- Edward Martyn (1859–1923), political and cultural activist
- Francis Martin (1652–1722), Augustinian priest
- Mary Gabriel Martyn (1604–1672), abbess of the Poor Clares of Galway
- Mary Letitia Martin (1815–1850), writer
- Peter Martin (STP) (died 1645), preacher
- Richard Martin (1754–1834), founder of The Society for the Prevention of Cruelty to Animals.
- Violet Florence Martin, (1862–1915), author

=== Morris ===
- Andrew Morris, Mayor of Galway, 1588–1589
- Lieutenant-Colonel Hon. George Henry Morris, 1872–1914, commanding officer of the Irish Guards
- Michael Morris, Baron Morris (1826–1901), judge and Privy Counsellor
- Martin Morris, 2nd Baron Killanin (1867–1927), politician
- Michael Morris, 3rd Baron Killanin (1914–99), sixth president of the International Olympic Committee 1972–80
- Redmond Morris, 4th Baron Killanin (born 1947), filmmaker
- Mouse Morris (born 1951), racehorse trainer and former jockey

=== Skerrett ===
- John Skerrett (c. 1620 – c. 1688), Augustinian preacher and missionary
- Nicholas Skerrett (died 1583), Archbishop of Tuam
- John Skerrett (Mayor) of Galway 1491–1492
- James Skerrett, fl. 1513–1532, Mayor of Galway
- Michael Skerrett, died 1785, Archbishop of Tuam

== Modern use ==
Similar to the nicknames used for other Irish counties, Galway city and county and its people are known as "the tribesmen". The nickname is in reference to the 14 tribes.

The tribes also lend their names to 14 of the roundabouts in or around the boundaries of Galway city. The roundabouts are signposted on navy blue signs containing the tribe's name in the Irish language.

== See also ==
- Seven Noble Houses of Brussels
- Bourgeois of Brussels
- Bourgeois of Paris
- Bourgeoisie of Geneva

== Bibliography ==
- Henry, William, Role of Honour:The Mayors of Galway City 1485–2001Galway, 2002. ISBN 0-906312-50-7
- Martyn, Adrian, The Tribes of Galway:1124–1642, Galway, 2016. ISBN 978-0-9955025-0-5
