= Galway by-election, 1874 =

Galway by-election, 1874 may refer to:

- Galway Borough by-election, March 1874
- Galway Borough by-election, June 1874
