= George Morris (Irish politician) =

George Morris MP

Member of Parliament for Galway Borough
- In office 31 January 1874 – 31 March 1880 Serving with William St Lawrence (until March 1874); Frank Hugh O'Donnell (until June 1874); Michael Francis Ward (from June 1874)
- Preceded by: William St Lawrence; Rowland Blennerhassett
- Succeeded by: T. P. O'Connor; John Orrell Lever
- In office 1 April 1867 – 17 November 1868 Serving with Rowland Blennerhassett
- Preceded by: Michael Morris; Rowland Blennerhassett
- Succeeded by: William St Lawrence; Rowland Blennerhassett

Personal details
- Born: April 1833
- Died: 11 September 1912 (aged 79)
- Party: Home Rule League; Liberal (formerly)

George Morris (April 1833 – 11 September 1912) was an Irish Home Rule League politician.

He was first elected as Member of Parliament (MP) for Galway Borough at a by-election in April 1867, representing the Liberals, but did not stand again in 1868. He returned to the seat in 1874, but again did not stand in 1880.

He was High Sheriff of Galway Town in 1860.

Parliament of the United Kingdom
Preceded by William St Lawrence and Rowland Blennerhassett	Member of Parliament for Galway Borough; 1874 – 1880; Served alongside: William St Lawrence (until March 1874); Frank Hugh O'Donnell (until June 1874); Michael Francis Ward (from June 1874)	Succeeded by T. P. O'Connor and John Orrell Lever
Preceded by Michael Morris and Rowland Blennerhassett	Member of Parliament for Galway Borough; 1867 – 1868; Served alongside: Rowland Blennerhassett	Succeeded by William St Lawrence and Rowland Blennerhassett
