= Frank Hugh O'Donnell =

Irish writer, journalist and nationalist politician (1846–1916)

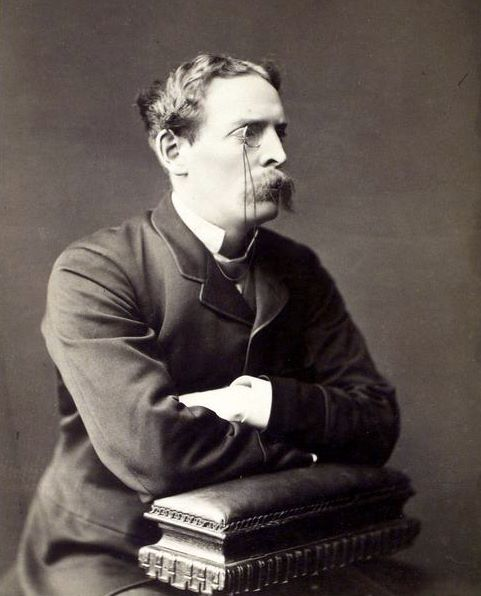
Frank Hugh O'Donnell

Frank Hugh O'Donnell (also Frank Hugh O'Cahan O'Donnell), born Francis Hugh MacDonald (9 October 1846 – 2 November 1916) was an Irish writer, journalist and nationalist politician.

== Early life ==
O'Donnell was born in an army barracks in Devon, England, where his father, Sergeant Bernard MacDonald, was stationed. His mother, Mary Kain, was a native of Ballybane, close to Galway city in Ireland. He was educated at the Erasmus Smith School in Galway, Coláiste Iognáid (the "Jes"), and later enrolled in Queen's College Galway, where he studied English literature, history and political economy. While a student at the college, he acquired a considerable reputation as an orator, and was a frequent contributor to meetings of the college's Literary and Debating Society, of which he became vice-auditor for the 1864–1865 session.

Even in his student days, O'Donnell seems to have been quick to voice his opinions, and revelled in controversy. In November 1866, addressing the Literary and Debating Society on the question "Was the character of Warren Hastings as Governor-General of India praiseworthy?", O'Donnell caused uproar by denouncing "the principle and the system which have lain at the root of the international and intercolonial policy of England, from the days when Elizabeth, the Infamous, chartered for profit two of the first ships which opened the African slave trade...". His remarks caused the chairman of the meeting, Professor Thomas Moffett, to prevent O'Donnell from continuing his speech, stating that "such an epithet ought not to be applied to any predecessor of our present gracious Queen." O'Donnell regarded such action as an unwarranted restriction on his freedom of speech, and in a letter published in the local press gave an early example of his high-flown literary style:

"I hold that Debating Societies are the nurseries of independent thought, and the training schools of sober criticism. I believe in the power and impartiality of an enlightened studenthood ... I have followed the mind of Austin. I have sat at the feet of Cairnes. I have drunk of the philosophy of Mill. I claim for Judicial Science, for Economic Science, for the Philosophy of History, a place in the discussions of our society, I pity and I scorn the formidable confederacy of fools who dare not call a spade a spade."

This incident, combined with the reluctance of the society to prevent O'Donnell from addressing its meetings, eventually led to the suspension of the society from the Queen's College and its temporary migration to rooms in the city of Galway.

O'Donnell graduated from the Queen's College with an M.A. degree in 1868, winning several gold medals for his academic performance. By this stage, he had begun to style himself 'Frank Hugh O'Donnell', believing himself to be a descendant of Hugh O'Donnell, Earl of Tyrconnell.

Leaving Galway, O'Donnell moved to London, where he embarked on a career in journalism, following his college contemporary T. P. O'Connor. O'Connor's knowledge of modern European languages had helped him to establish himself as a correspondent on European affairs, and he assisted O'Donnell in developing a similar reputation; he spent a brief period on the staff of the London Morning Post.

== Politics ==
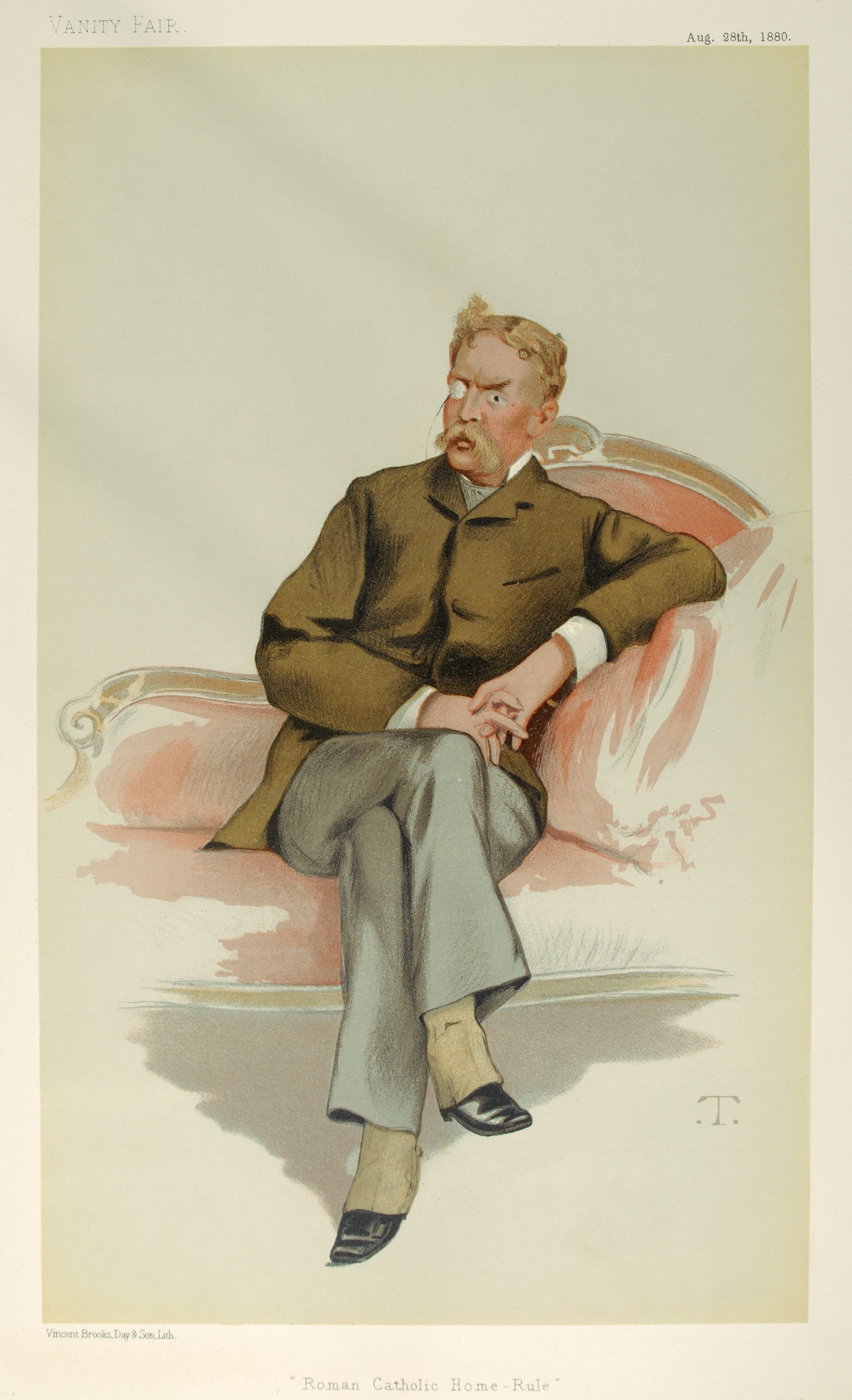
"Roman Catholic Home-Rule". Caricature by T published in Vanity Fair in 1880.

In the 1874 general election, he was elected Member of Parliament for Galway, but was unseated by the courts in what appears to have been a politically inspired judgment which used certain unsavoury campaigning tactics in which O'Donnell had indulged as its basis. He was succeeded in the seat by his election agent, Dr Michael Francis Ward, who was himself succeeded in 1880 by T.P. O'Connor – in an unusual succession, all three had been either auditor or vice-auditor of the Queen's College Literary and Debating Society in the same era.

In 1875, he was a founding member of the Constitutional Society of India, a group promoting political autonomy for India. In 1877, O'Donnell secured a more permanent election to the House of Commons of the United Kingdom as MP for Dungarvan, County Waterford; he held the seat until 1885, when the constituency was abolished. He struck a colourful and controversial figure in parliament and became renowned for his declamatory speech-making. He claimed credit for inventing the tactic of obstructionism which was to yield such results for the Home Rule League under Charles Stewart Parnell. Indeed, O'Donnell saw himself as a natural leader and became disillusioned when Parnell was selected in May 1880 to succeed William Shaw as leader of the Irish Parliamentary Party. He called the British 'Imperial pirates' and inaugurated the Constitutional Society of India. Its aim was Home Rule for India, 'Mr O'Donnell's grand passion in politics was a confederation of all the discontented races of the Empire under the lead of the Irish party. He once brought down some scores of dusky students of all the races and creeds of Hindustan to the House of Commons.'

Parnell refused to let O'Donnell be nominated in 1885. He left the Irish Parliamentary Party and conventional politics, but not its general aims of promoting home rule and tenant farmers' rights. His last and perhaps most important contribution to the fortunes of the party was the libel case he launched against the Times in 1888 over the series "Parnellism and Crime"; though the case was lost, it resulted in the establishment of the Parnell Commission which exonerated Parnell from condoning the Phoenix Park Murders, and exposed the Piggott Forgeries.

== Author ==
In his later years O'Donnell began investigating misconduct by both the British Civil Service and the Roman Catholic church in Ireland. His Paraguay on Shannon (1908) is an amusing but serious critique of unethical practices by the Catholic clergy in local politics, education, and their involvement in the Congested Districts Board that was financed by Parliament in order to improve the depressed economy of western Ireland. Parliament believed that by improving the living standards of the Irish peasant class, they could "kill Home Rule with kindness."

After careful investigation, O'Donnell accused members of the Catholic clergy of illegally diverting Government money earmarked for economic development into new Cathedrals, parish churches, and other ecclesiastical building projects. O'Donnell argued that the British Government needed to provide better oversight of how the Congested Districts Board's funds were being used. He believed that 'in Ireland material ruin has accompanied clerical despotism'. His hostility to the Church drew the ire of Catholic historians who systematically undermined his credibility.

Belfort Bax wrote [O'Donnell's] 'matter is better than his manner'.

== Publications ==
- A History of the Irish Parliamentary Party (2 vols), London, Longmans Green & Co., 1910
- Paraguay on Shannon Hodges & Figgis, Dublin, 1908.
- A Borrowed Plume of the "Daily News": The First Description of the Bulgarian Rising in 1876. London: Arthur L. Humphreys. 1912. hdl:2027/wu.89013491543.

== See also ==
- Parnell Commission
- Michael JF McCarthy

Parliament of the United Kingdom
Preceded by Sir Rowland Blennerhassett; Michael Morris	Member of Parliament for Galway Borough; 1874–1874; With: George Morris	Succeeded by Michael Francis Ward; George Morris
Preceded by John O'Keeffe	Member of Parliament for Dungarvan; 1877–1885	Constituency abolished
