= John Lever (disambiguation) =

John Lever is an English cricketer.

John Lever may also refer to:

- John Lever, drummer of The Chameleons
- John Orrell Lever, English shipping owner and politician
- Johnny Lever, Indian actor and comedian
- John Lever (MP for Calne), see Calne (UK Parliament constituency)
