= William St Lawrence, 4th Earl of Howth =

Anglo-Irish landowning peer and politician

The Right Honourable The Earl of Howth KP
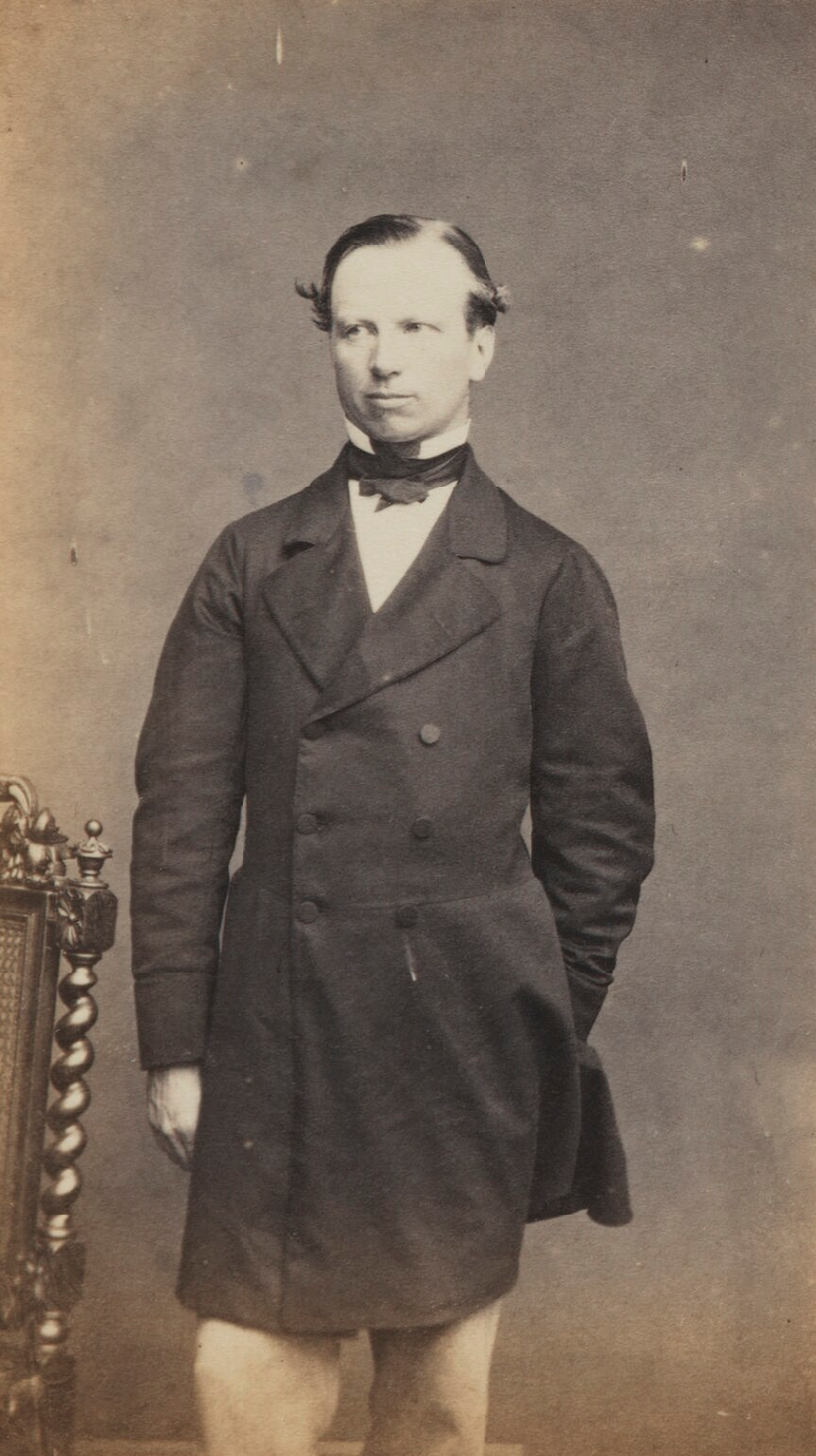
- William St Lawrence as Viscount St Lawrence, 1860s photograph

Member of Parliament for Galway Borough
- In office 1868-1874 Serving with Sir Rowland Blennerhassett

High Sheriff of County Dublin
- In office 1854

Personal details
- Born: 25 June 1827
- Died: 9 March 1909 (aged 81) Bournemouth, England
- Party: Liberal
- Parent: Thomas St Lawrence (father)
- Relatives: John de Burgh (grandfather)
- Military career
- Rank: Captain
- Unit: 7th Queen's Own Hussars

William Ulick Tristram St Lawrence, 4th Earl of Howth KP (25 June 1827 – 9 March 1909) was an Irish peer, styled Viscount St Lawrence until 1874. He became Earl of Howth in 1874 on the death of his father, Thomas St Lawrence, 3rd Earl of Howth, and was appointed a Knight of the Order of St Patrick on 8 May 1884. His mother was Thomas's first wife Lady Emily de Burgh, daughter of John de Burgh, 13th Earl of Clanricarde.

== Biography ==
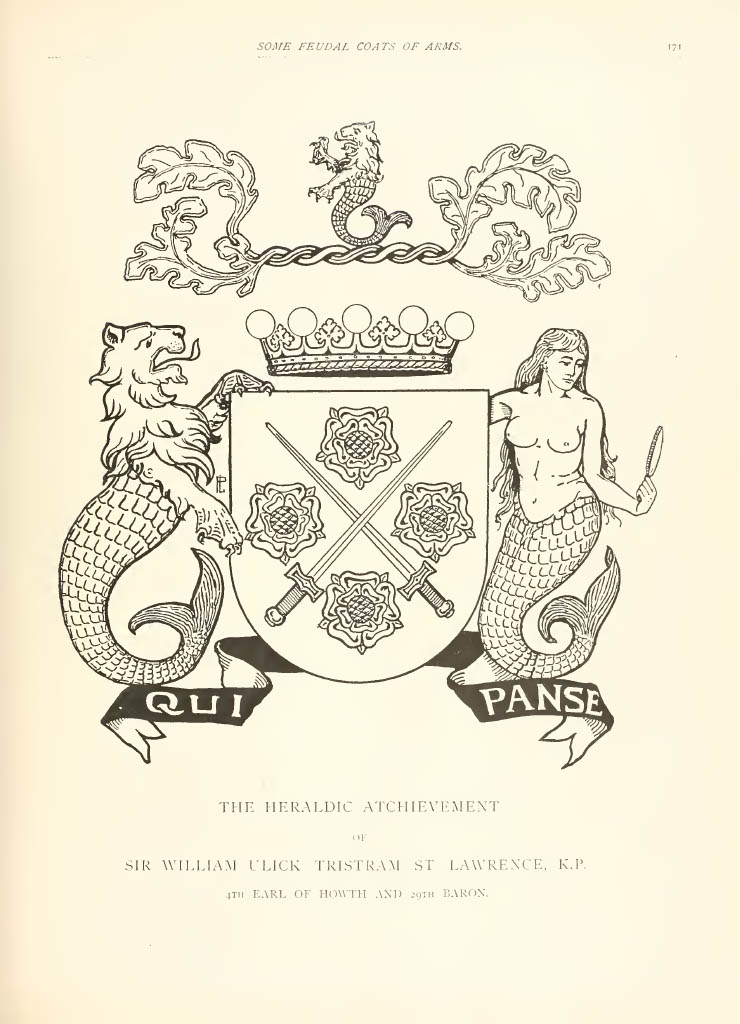
The Heraldic Atchievement of Sir William Ulick Tristram St. Lawrence, K.P. 4th Earl of Howth and 29th Baron

He became a captain in the 7th Queen's Own Hussars 1847. He was High Sheriff of County Dublin in 1854. He sat in the English House of Commons as a Liberal MP for Galway Borough from 1868 to 1874. He was State Steward to the Viceroy of Ireland from 1855 to 1858.

Lord Howth suffered from tuberculous that he believed to have had "inherited from his mother" and often wintered at Pau from 1863 due to its milder climate. For several years he served on the kennel committee of the Pau Hunt and as master of the Pau hounds during the 1878-1879 season. He was an advocate for traditional fox hunting, opposing the hunting of animals that had been captured for release as bagmen. He also encouraged the popular and more difficult sport of drag hunting be coursed and accessible to less-abled riders.

He died at a Bournemouth hotel aged 81, unmarried. The family titles became extinct on his death as he had no male heir.

Parliament of the United Kingdom
Preceded by Sir Rowland Blennerhassett; George Morris	Member of Parliament for Galway Borough; 1868–1874; With: Sir Rowland Blennerhassett	Succeeded by Frank Hugh O'Donnell; George Morris
Peerage of Ireland
Preceded by Thomas St Lawrence	Earl of Howth; 1874–1909	Extinct
Peerage of the United Kingdom
New creation	Baron Howth; 1881–1909	Extinct
