= Leon Ó Broin =

Irish writer and civil servant

León Ó Broin (10 November 1902 – 26 February 1990) was an Irish civil servant, known as a writer and playwright. He wrote many plays, stories and historical works in both Irish and English.

== Life ==
He was born in Dublin, and joined Sinn Féin and Fianna Éireann while still at school.

He was imprisoned in 1921 and 1922 and afterwards joined the Free State army as a non-combatant. In 1924 he was the first Administrative Officer appointed by the new Free State civil service, where he worked mainly in the Department of Finance. He was Secretary of the Department of Posts and Telegraphs from 1948 to 1967.

Together with Frank Duff he formed the Pillar of Fire Society in 1942, for Catholic-Jewish dialogue, after rumours about the killing of Jews in Europe starting coming through to Ireland. He presented a paper at the first meeting, helped by a Jewish colleague and friend, Laurence Elyan.

== Writings ==
=== Books in Irish ===
- Arus na nGábhadh agus Scéalta Eile (Dublin 1923)
- Ag Strachadh leis an Saol agus Scéalta Eile (Dublin 1929)
- An Rún agus Scéalta Eile (Dublin 1933)
- Parnell (Dublin: Oifig an tSoláthair 1937)
- Miss Crookshank agus Emmet (Dublin: Sairseal & Dill 1954)
- Miss Crookshank agus Coirp Eile (Dublin: Sairseal & Dill 1951)
- Comhcheilg sa Chaisleán (Dublin 1963)
- Na Sasanaigh agus Eirí Amach na Cásca (Dublin: Sáirséal agus Dill 1967).
- An Maidíneach: Staraí na nÉireannach Aontaithe (Dublin 1971)

=== Plays ===
- Slan Muirisg (1944)
- An Boisgín Ceoil (1945)
- An Oíche úd i mBeithil (1949).

=== Translations ===
- An Fuadach (1931) Kidnapped by R L Stevenson
- Cogadh na Reann (1934) War of the Worlds by H.G. Wells

=== Books in English ===
- The Unfortunate Mr Robert Emmet. Dublin: Clonmore & Reynolds; London : Burns Oates & Washbourne. 1958. OCLC 264934136.
- Dublin Castle and the 1916 rising: the story of Sir Matthew Nathan. London: Sidgwick & Jackson. 1967 [1966]. OCLC 1699538.
- Ó Broin, León (1967). Charles Gavan Duffy: Patriot and Statesman: the story of Charles Gavan Duffy (1816-1903). Dublin: Duffy. ISBN 978-0-900343-03-2.
- Ó Broin, León (1969). The Chief Secretary, Augustine Birrell in Ireland. London: Chatto & Windus; Edinburgh: Archon. ISBN 978-0-208-00982-1.
- Ó Broin, León (1971). Fenian fever: an Anglo-American dilemma. London: Chatto & Windus. ISBN 978-0-7011-1749-8.
- Ó Broin, León (1980). Michael Collins. Dublin: Gill & Macmillan. ISBN 978-0-7171-1076-6.
- Ó Broin, León (1983). In Great Haste: Letters of Michael Collins and Kitty Kiernan. Dublin: Gill & Macmillan. ISBN 978-0-7171-1287-6.
- Ó Broin, León (1986). Just like yesterday: an autobiography. Dublin: Gill & Macmillan. ISBN 978-0-7171-1431-3.
- Ó Broin, León (1976). Revolutionary underground: the story of the Irish Republican Brotherhood, 1858-1924. Rowman and Littlefield. ISBN 978-0-87471-863-8.
- Ó Broin, León (1982). No man's man: a biographical memoir of Joseph Brennan, civil servant & first governor of the Central Bank. Dublin: Institute of Public Administration. ISBN 978-0-906980-20-0.
- Ó Broin, León (1985). Protestant Nationalists in Revolutionary Ireland, The Stopford Connection. Dublin: Gill & Macmillan. ISBN 978-0-389-20569-2.
- Ó Broin, León (1989). W.E.Wylie and the Irish Revolution 1916-1921. Dublin: Gill and Macmillan.

== See also ==
- Parnell Commission The conspiracy case written about by Ó Broin.
- Irish History
