= Marie Galway =

British women's rights activist (1876–1963)

Lady Galway CBE DStJ
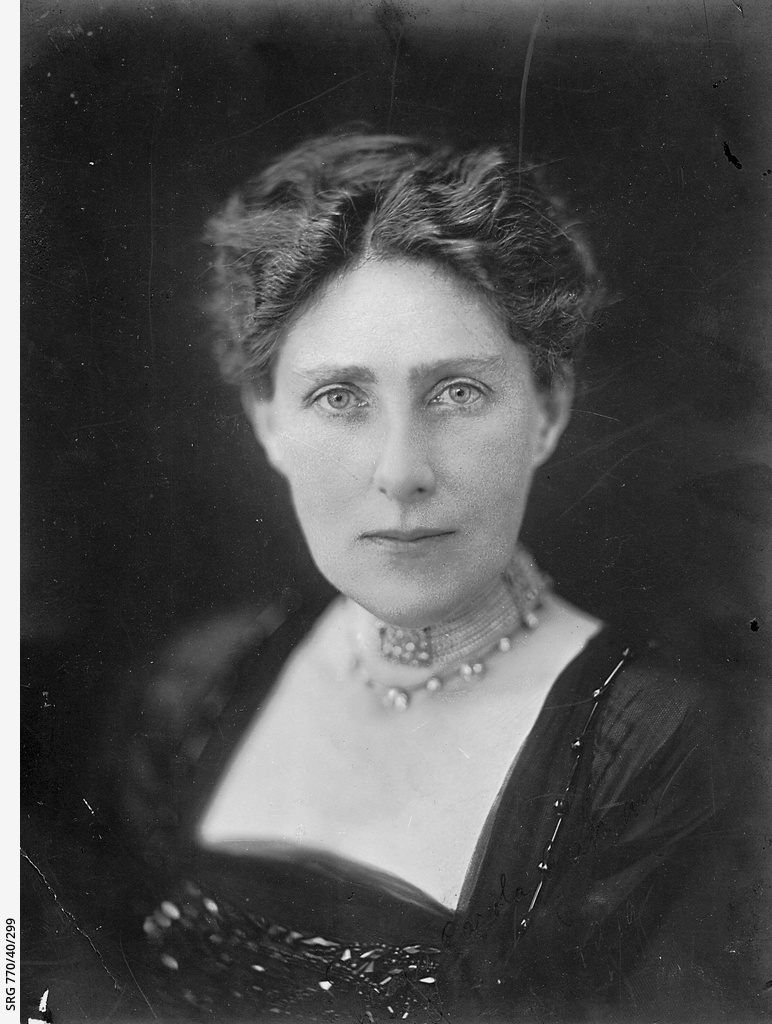
- First president of the Red Cross in South Australia
- Born: Marie Carola Franciska Roselyne Blennerhassett; 5 January 1876; Mayfair, London
- Died: 29 June 1963 (aged 87)
- Notable work: First President, Red Cross in South Australia
- Spouses: Baron Raphael d'Erlanger (m. 1894; died 1897) Sir Henry Galway (m. 1913; died 1949)

Marie Carola Franciska Roselyne, Lady Galway CBE DStJ (née Blennerhassett; 5 January 1876 – 29 June 1963), was a British charity and civic worker and advocate for women's rights. She was married to Sir Henry Galway, Governor of South Australia.

== Biography ==
Galway was born at Mayfair, London, the only daughter of two leaders of the English Liberal Catholic Movement, Sir Rowland Blennerhassett, Irish baronet and parliamentarian, and his wife, Countess Charlotte Julia de Leyden, a biographer and historian from Bavaria, whom he had met when attending the First Vatican Council.

She attended private schools in Germany, France and Switzerland and read extensively in six languages. Her first marriage was on 28 November 1894 to French biologist Baron Raphael d'Erlanger who had a laboratory at the University of Heidelberg. They had a daughter and a son before he died in 1897 and she returned to England, where she worked for the sick and destitute, and helped to found a committee to advise on legislation affecting women and children.

Shortly after her marriage to Sir Henry Galway in 1914, she accompanied her husband to Adelaide on his appointment as Governor of South Australia. His term there (from 1914 to 1920) was controversial, including his stirring up war-time negative feeling against Australians of German descent, despite the fact that his wife was half-German. She returned to England in January 1919, 15 months before her husband.

== Lady Galway Convalescent Home ==
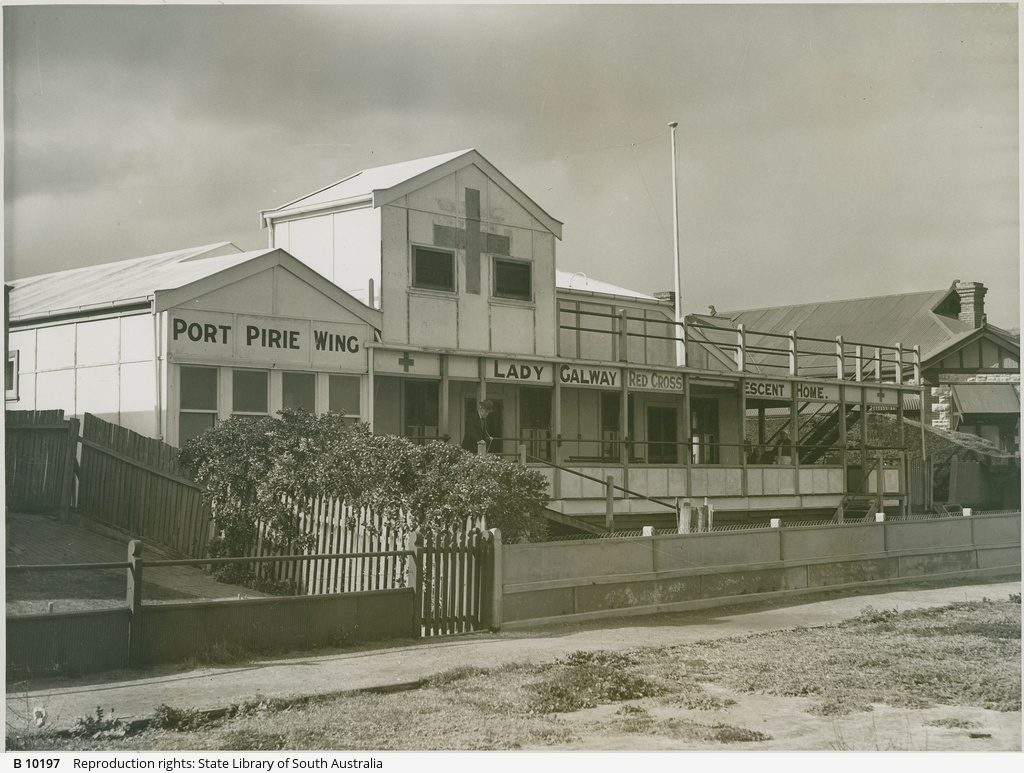
Lady Galway Home for Convalescent Soldiers, Henley Beach

In August 1914, at the request of Lady Helen Munro Ferguson (the wife of Governor General of Australia Ronald Munro Ferguson), Lady Galway founded the South Australian division of the British Red Cross Society. The South Australian division was originally housed in the Government House Ballroom on North Terrace, where volunteers sorted and packed items for members of the Australian Defence personnel serving overseas.

The Lady Galway Convalescent Home, also known as the Lady Galway clubhouse for soldiers, was opened in 1916 at Henley Beach. The convalescent home was under the management of the army and navy department of the Y.M.C.A. until September 1919, when it was officially handed over to the Governor of South Australia, Sir Henry Galway. The wife of the governor, or if the governor is female, the governor herself, has since been the president of the Red Cross in South Australia.

The home was used by returning soldiers of any rank who required, by medical examination, to need a period of rest. The patient was also required to be free from any infectious or mental disease.

In 1946, the home moved to Roberts Street in Glenelg and its former buildings were merged with the Junior Red Cross Home across the road to become the Lady Hore-Ruthven Junior Red Cross Home.

== Awards and honours ==
Marie Galway was awarded the Belgian Médaille de la Reine Elisabeth and the Médaille de la Reconnaissance française, and was appointed Dame of Grace of the Order of St John and Commander of the Order of the British Empire (1926).
