= Cork Defence Union =

The Cork Defence Union (CDU) was a landlord organisation established in County Cork in Ireland, in September 1885, to counter the Plan of Campaign devised by the Irish National League. It also opposed Home Rule and was active into the early 20th century.

== History ==
The CDU was established, during the period known as the Land War, by a number of "leading landlords and farmers in the county". Formed to counter the Irish National League's 'Plan of Campaign', one of its stated purposes was to "unite together all friends of law and order of all classes in this county in a body for their mutual defence and protection". While it was a "landlord dominated organisation", its members (of which there were approximately 770 in 1886) also reportedly included merchants, farmers, shopkeepers, artisans and labourers. The CDU was organised under the presidency of James Bernard, 4th Earl of Bandon and his assistant Hayes St Leger, 4th Viscount Doneraile to support those impacted by the National League's boycotting campaign.

Similar to the Property Defence Association (formed in Dublin in 1880), and associated with Arthur Smith-Barry, 1st Baron Barrymore, it was primarily a Unionist organisation. A parallel organisation, the Irish Defence Union, was headed by the Earl of Bandon and "based in London for lobbying and fund-raising purposes". The CDU was involved in providing labourers and machinery for boycotted farms and opposed the renewal of licences to publicans who were involved in boycotting.

The CDU, which was also opposed to Home Rule, was reportedly described by the Irish Parliamentary Party politician William John Lane as the "Royal Cattle-Lifting and Outrage Manufacturing Association". While it remained in existence until 1918, the settlement of the "Irish Land Question" by 1909 had "made the Union redundant".

== See also ==
- Protestant Ascendancy
