= Charlotte Lady Blennerhassett =

German writer and biographer

Lady Blennerhassett
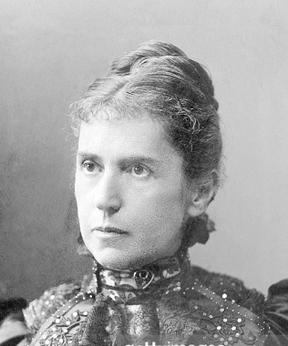
- Lady Blennerhassett
- Born: Countess Charlotte Julia von Leyden; 19 February 1843; Munich
- Died: 11 February 1917 (aged 73); Munich
- Occupation: writer
- Spouse: Sir Rowland Blennerhassett, 4th Baronet
- Children: 2 (including Marie, Lady Galway)
- Writing career
- Genre: non-fiction

Charlotte Julia, Lady Blennerhassett (née Countess Julia von Leyden; 19 February 1843 – 11 February 1917) was a German writer and biographer.

== Life ==
Countess Charlotte Julia von Leyden was born in Munich in 1843. She met Sir Rowland Blennerhassett, 4th Baronet in 1870 and married him on 9 June of the same year. The new Lady Blennerhassett took to writing, and her most noted work was a biography of Madame de Staël. This was published in Germany in three volumes. After this she wrote a number of other biographies including one of Mary, Queen of Scots, and two chapters for Volume X of The Cambridge Modern History, published in 1907.

Her children included Sir Arthur Charles Francis Bernard Blennerhassett, 5th Baronet, and Marie Galway.

Blennerhassett died in Munich in 1917.

== Selected publications ==
- Frau von Staël, ihre Freunde und ihre Bedeutung in Politik und Literatur. Berlin 1887–1889.
  - Madame de Staël, her friends and her influence in politics and literature. 1889
- Talleyrand. 1894. (orig. German version)
  - Talleyrand. 1894, trans. from the German by Frederick Clarke
- Maria Stuart, Königin von Schottland, 1542–1587; nach den neuesten Forschungen und Veröffentlichungen aus Staatsarchiven dargestellt. 1902.
- Chateaubriand : Romantik und die Restaurationsepoche in Frankreich. 1903.
- John Henry Kardinal Newman: ein Beitrag zur religiösen Entwicklungsgeschichte der Gegenwart. Berlin 1904.
- Die Jungfrau von Orleans. 1906.
- Louis XIV and Madame de Maintenon. 1910.
- Streiflichter. 1911. (trans. as Sidelights)
  - Sidelights. 1913, trans. from the German by Edith Gülcher
