= Parnell Commission =

Public inquiry in Ireland, 1888–1890

The Parnell Commission, officially the Commissioners under the Special Commission Act 1888, (Note: Equivalently Commissioners appointed under the Act 51st and 52nd Victoria, chap. 35. Shorter titles include Special Commission, 1888 or Special Commission (1888). Fuller titles include Special Commission to inquire into the charges and allegations made against certain Members of Parliament and other Persons by the Defendants in the recent trial of an action entitled O'Donnell v. Walter and another and Special Commission to inquire into the Charges and allegations made against certain Members of Parliament and other persons) was a judicial commission of inquiry from 1888 to 1890 into allegations made in articles in The Times in 1887, and a resulting libel trial in 1888, that members of the Irish Parliamentary Party (IPP) had condoned or were complicit in criminal acts associated with the Land War or the Irish Republican Brotherhood. The most serious allegation was a putative letter by IPP leader Charles Stewart Parnell condoning the 1882 Phoenix Park Murders; in his 1889 testimony to the commission, Richard Pigott admitted to having forged the letter. The commission was largely seen as vindication for Parnell, although its report substantiated some of the lesser allegations against IPP members.

== Background ==
The Phoenix Park Murders occurred on 6 May 1882, when two leading members of the British Government in Ireland, Chief Secretary for Ireland Lord Frederick Cavendish and the Permanent Under-Secretary for Ireland T.H. Burke were stabbed to death in Phoenix Park, Dublin by the Irish National Invincibles.

In March 1887, The Times published a series of articles, "Parnellism and Crime", in which Home Rule League leaders were accused of being involved in murder and outrage during the Land War. The Times produced a number of facsimile letters, allegedly bearing Parnell's signature and in one of the letters Parnell had excused and condoned the murder of T. H. Burke in the Phoenix Park.

In particular the newspaper had paid £1,780 for a letter supposedly written by Parnell to Patrick Egan, a Fenian activist, that included: "Though I regret the accident of Lord F Cavendish's death I cannot refuse to admit that Burke got no more than his deserts" and was signed "Yours very truly, Charles S. Parnell". On the day it was published (18 April 1887), Parnell described the letter in the House of Commons as "a villainous and barefaced forgery."

Also on 18 April the bill for the Perpetual Crimes Act had its second reading and debate in the Commons. It appeared to nationalists that it was more than coincidental that the Times article on the letter was published on the same day and was obviously intended to sway the debate.

Frank Hugh O'Donnell, who had been accused of Fenianism in the Times articles, took a libel case against the newspaper's editor John Walter, without consulting Parnell. The case was dismissed on 5 July 1888, but the additional allegations raised during the O'Donnell v. Walter trial precipitated the creation of a special commission established by statute.

== The commission ==
Special Commission Act 1888
- Act of Parliament
- Parliament of the United Kingdom
- Long title: An Act to constitute a Special Commission to inquire into the charges and allegations made against certain Members of Parliament and other Persons by the Defendants in the recent trial of an action entitled O'Donnell v. Walter and another.
- Citation: 51 & 52 Vict. c. 35
- Introduced by: W. H. Smith (Commons); Marquess of Salisbury (Lords)
- Territorial extent: United Kingdom

Dates
- Royal assent: 13 August 1888
- Commencement: 13 August 1888 (Note: The Acts of Parliament (Commencement) Act 1793.)
- Repealed: 21 December 1908
Other legislation
Repealed by	Statute Law Revision Act 1908

Status: Repealed

Text of statute as originally enacted

After considerable argument, the government eventually set up a special commission to investigate the charges made against Parnell and the Home Rule party. The commission sat for 128 days between September 1888 and November 1889. In February 1889, one of the witnesses, Richard Pigott, admitted to having forged the letters; he then fled to Madrid, where he shot himself. Parnell's name was fully cleared. He brought a libel action against The Times which resulted in Parnell being awarded a large sum of money. His principal lawyer was Charles Russell, who later become Lord Chief Justice. Russell also wrote an influential book about the case.

In an out-of-court settlement Parnell accepted £5,000 in damages. While this was less than the £100,000 he sought, the legal costs for The Times brought its overall costs to £200,000. When Parnell re-entered parliament after he was vindicated, he received a standing ovation from his fellow MPs.

The commission did not limit itself to the forgeries, but also examined at length the surrounding circumstances, and in particular the violent aspects of the Land War and the Plan of Campaign. Testimony included an extensive submission by Land League founder Michael Davitt for which he was paid by The Irish Party. In July 1889, the Irish Nationalist MPs and their lawyers withdrew, satisfied with the main result. When it eventually published its evidence it satisfied for the most part the pro- and anti-nationalist camps in Ireland:

- Nationalists were pleased that Parnell had been heroically vindicated, in particular against The Times which had become a supporter of the high Tory prime minister Lord Salisbury.
- Unionists conceded that Parnell was innocent, but pointed to a surrounding mass of sworn evidence that suggested that some of his MPs had condoned or advocated violence in such a way that murders were inevitable. They also made much of the fact that Pigott had formerly been a Nationalist supporter and was clearly deranged.

== Historiography ==
A balanced and up-to-date overview of the "Parnellism and Crime" affair is given by T. W. Moody (1968), who was able to take advantage of the important modern contributions of Henry Harrison in the 1940s and 1950s and of Leon Ó Broin in the 1960s. The commission has a chapter in Myles Dungan's 2009 Conspiracy: Irish Political Trials Andrew Robert's 1999 biography of Salisbury mainly lists the government's concerns, in chapter 27 covering the period from March 1887 to July 1891.

== Bibliography ==
Primary

- Parnellism and Crime, reprinted from the Times (3rd ed.). London: George Edward Wright. 1887.
- O'Donnell v. Walter, reprinted from the Times. London: George Edward Wright. 1888.

Statutes:

- Special Commission Act 1888 [51 & 52 Vict.] c. 35

Report:

- Special Commission to inquire into Charges and Allegations against certain M.P.s in Proceedings in Action of O'Donnell v. Walter (1890). Report. Command papers. Vol. C.5891. HMSO.
  - A verbatim copy of the Parnell Commission report : with complete index and notes. London: Irish Loyal and Patriotic Union. 1890.

Proceedings:

- Special Commission Act, 1888: Reprint of the Shorthand Notes of the Speeches, Proceedings and Evidence Taken Before the Commissioners Appointed Under the Above-Named Act. HMSO. 1890. OCLC 84661542. — 12 volumes (vol. 11 online at HathiTrust)
  - Special Commission Act, 1888: Report of the Proceedings Before the Commissioners Appointed by the Act: reprinted from The Times. London: George Edward Wright. 1890. OCLC 1542788099. — 4 volumes
  - Special Commission Act, 1888: Mr. Charles Stewart Parnell, M.P., and others: Report of Proceedings: uncorrected proof. London: Lewis & Lewis. 1888–1889. OCLC 1155589967. — 8 volumes

Parliamentary Debates (Hansard):

- Commons 3–11 March 1890 "Special Commission (1888) Report" vol. 341 cols 1656–1759, 1779–1782, 1782–1876; vol. 342 cols 3–56, 138–232, 261, 261–324, 347–360, 361, 361–460, 510–615.
- Lords 21 March 1890 "Ireland—Special Commission (1888) Report" vol. 342 cols 1357–1497

Secondary

- Harrison, Henry (1953). Parnell, Joseph Chamberlain, and "The Times": A Documentary Record: Tempora Mutantur. Belfast; Dublin: Irish News;Brown & Nolan.
- Healy, Tim. Letters And Leaders Of My Day. Vol. I. London: Thornton Butterworth. pp. 266–307.
- Moody, T. W. (1968). "The Times versus Parnell and Co., 1887–90". Historical Studies. 7th Irish Conference of Historians, Trinity College Dublin, 1965. Vol. VI. London: Routledge & Kegan Paul. pp. 147–182 – via Open Library.
- Ó Broin, Leon (1963). Comhcheilg sa Chaisleán [Conspiracy in the Castle] (in Irish). Dublin: Sáirséal agus Dill. — later expanded and published in English as
  - Ó Broin, Leon (1971). The Prime Informer: A Suppressed Scandal. London: Sidgwick & Jackson. ISBN 028348490X. OCLC 1484087715.
- Roberts, Andrew (1999). Salisbury Victorian Titan. London: Phoenix Press. ISBN 0-7538-1091-3.
