= John Mandeville (Land Leaguer) =

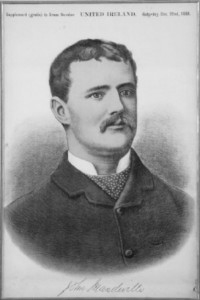
- Born: 24 June 1849; Ballydine, near Carrick-on-suir-County Tipperary
- Died: 8 July 1888 (aged 39); Mitchelstown, County Cork
- Resting place: Kilbehenny Cemetery

John Mandeville (24 June 1849 – 8 July 1888), was an Irish Fenian and member of the Irish National Land League.

== Early life and family ==
John Mandeville was born in Ballydine, near Carrick-on-Suir, County Tipperary on 24 June 1849. He was the third son of James Hackett Mandeville (1797–1858) and Jane Mandeville (née O'Mahony) (died 1893). His maternal uncle was the founder of the Fenian Brotherhood, John O'Mahony. Mandeville was splashed on the ear as an infant with a drop of molten lead from a broken mould the O'Mahonys were using to manufacture bullets for an unsuccessful rising in 1849, which resulted in a scar Mandeville was proud of. There are no records of Mandeville's schooling, but it is thought he attended secondary school. He was a committed Fenian from his adolescence, and may have had minor involvement in the 1867 rising. It is thought that through his Fenian connections, he first met William O'Brien when he was conducting his investigative journalism in the Galtee Mountains on social conditions there in 1876–1877. By 1886, Mandeville was the ex-officio chairman of the Mitchelstown board of guardians, and a close confidant of O'Brien who drew him into the Irish National Land League and reform politics. He married Mary O'Geran on 3 February 1880.

== Activism ==
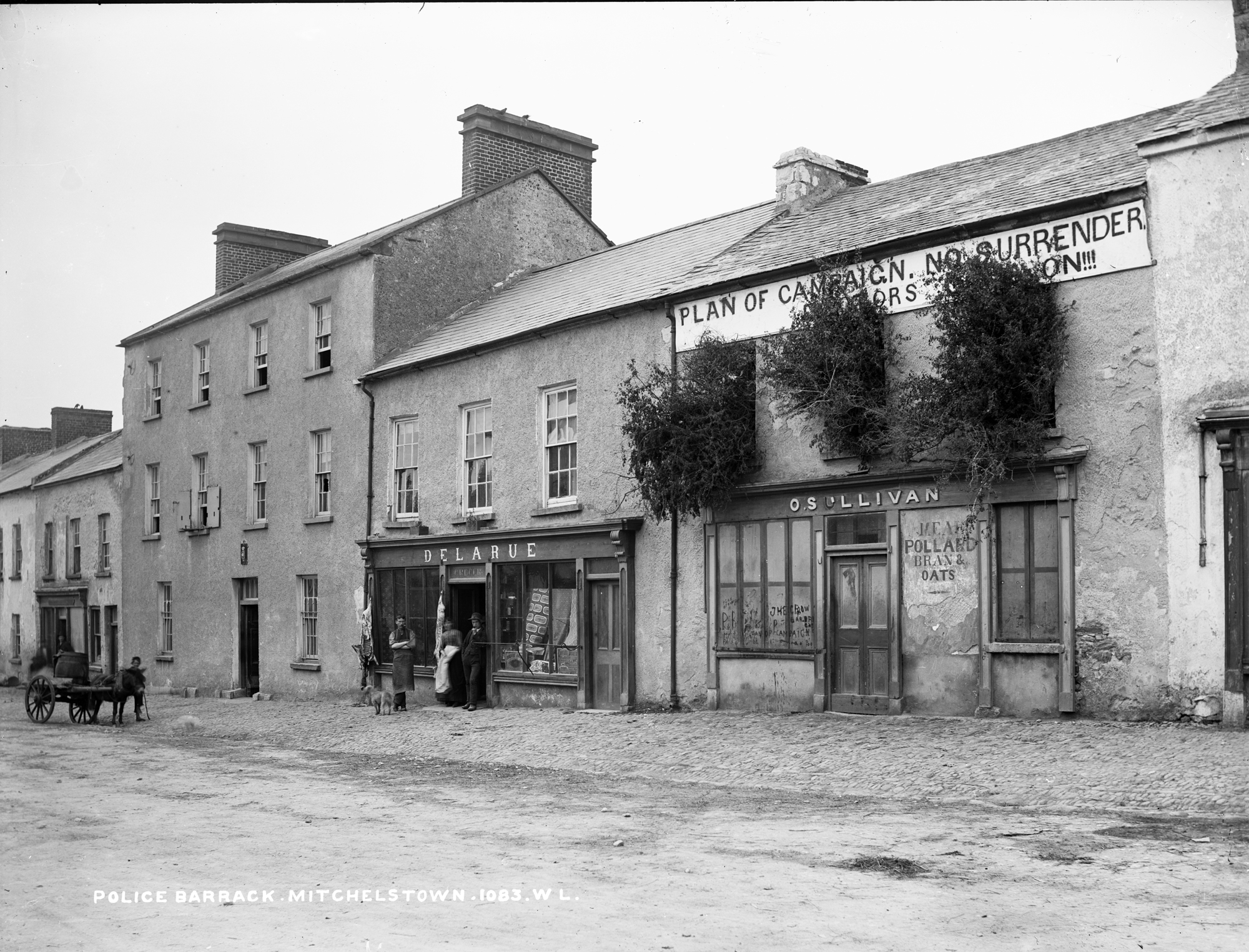
O'Sullivan's pub, the headquarters of Mandeville's Plan of Campaign in Mitchelstown

Mandeville was a farmer, working a 200-acre freehold farm, a mile outside Mitchelstown, County Cork. The land had been ceded to his mother by his uncle, John O'Mahony, in 1853 before he emigrated to the United States. The local economy of the time was suffering from continuous fall in butter prices, and intense resistance at the evictions taking place around Mitchelstown on the Kingston estate in 1881 to 1882 led to unrest and resentment among tenant farmers. Mandeville chaired the local National League branch, and was eager to launch the Plan of Campaign, announced in October 1886, if appeals by tenants for 20% reduction in rent went unheeded. On 11 December 1886, the estate tenantry formally adopted this plan at a meeting in the town. Mandeville oversaw the campaign, which was highly publicised, from O'Sullivan's pub near the town's Royal Irish Constabulary barracks. On 23 February 1887, he organised a demonstration of solidarity by neighbouring farmers and labourers. In May 1887, he was one of the key members who established a boycott of Mitchelstown Castle.

With threats that the dowager countess of Kingston was planning to rush through evictions ahead of the land legislation becoming law, Mandeville and O'Brien called on those attending a meeting in Mitchelstown on 9 and 11 August to prepare to defend their houses when outstanding warrants were executed. This led to both being summoned to Mitchelstown petty sessions on 9 September under the Criminal Law and Procedure (Ireland) Act of 19 July 1887 which outlawed incitement against payment of rent. This was the first case under the act. They ignored the summons, and on the day of the hearing conflict between the crowd and the police led to three farmers being shot dead. This caused embarrassment for the chief secretary, Arthur Balfour, and is thought to have led to the later treatment of Mandeville. Mandeville was given a two-month sentence, and O'Brien three months at the petty sessions on 22 September 1887. On 31 October, their appeals were rejected, and were brought to Cork City Gaol. They claimed to be political prisoners, and refused to wear prison clothing or engage in menial duties. Balfour was concerned that this could be construed as a propaganda victory.

== Imprisonment ==
On their first night in prison, while he slept the warders took Mandeville's clothing, but they returned it when the two were brought to Tullamore Jail the next night by special train. Here Balfour was assured that the doctor and governor were not sympathetic to the prisoners. Mandeville began to receive penalties for infractions of the prison code from 5 November 1887, with Balfour closely monitoring the situation. O'Brien was transferred to the prison hospital swiftly when his health declined, Mandeville who was not as well known, was targeted to break his insistence on his political status. As a large and muscular man, it is thought that this tempted to authorities into a reckless disregard for his health. He was repeatedly placed in solitary confinement, on a diet of coarse bread and cold water in draughty, unsanitary conditions, where he developed continual diarrhoea, painful rheumatism and a chronic sore throat. He was stripped of his clothing, and was left for a day semi-naked in the extreme cold. James Ridley, the prison doctor, certified him fit for the punishments regardless of his condition.

When members of the visiting committee leaked information about Mandeville's treatment to the press, a scandal broke out in late November 1887 across Ireland and England. Balfour was unswayed by this, but allowed Mandeville separate exercise at the discretion of the prison. Mandeville lost three stone (19 kg) in weight by late December, had lost vision and trembled constantly. When he was released on 24 December, he was greeted with bonfires on the mountains, and huge crowds in Mitchelstown, to which he gave a short speech before returning home.

== Death and legacy ==
A few months after his imprisonment, Mandeville took part in a protest against a local tax for police expenses. However, his health did not recover, and in April 1888 he was described by O'Brien as "a broken man ... bluish, extremely nervous ... frequently trembling". He died from an inflamed throat on 8 July 1888, and is buried in Kilbehenny cemetery.

A corner's inquest was held on 17–28 July 1888 following national outrage at police prevarication. His wife, Mary, was one of the key witnesses. The verdict drew a clear line from the brutal treatment he received in prison and his death. Balfour dismissed the decision as partial, but public outcry led to the establishment of a select committee on prison dress and other elements of the penal code. This led to amendments to the General Prisons (Ireland) Act, 1877, allowing prisoners to wear civilian clothing, and to be isolated from others due to health concerns. There were no further cases of prison mistreatment in the years that followed, but improved treatment was not reliably given to political prisoners.

In April 1906, a bronze statue of Mandeville was erected in New Square, Mitchelstown.
