= Sir Rowland Blennerhassett, 4th Baronet =

Sir Rowland Blennerhassett, 4th Baronet PC (Ire) JP (5 September 1839 – 22 March 1909) was a Roman Catholic Anglo-Irish baronet and Liberal Party politician from County Kerry.

== Life ==
Blennerhassett was the son of Sir Arthur Blennerhassett, 3rd Baronet, whose ancestors had settled in Kerry under Queen Elizabeth, and his wife Sarah Mahony. He was educated at Downside School, Stonyhurst College and Christ Church, Oxford. He then spent time at the Université catholique de Louvain, before travelling in Germany. In 1849, he succeeded his father as baronet. When he returned to the United Kingdom, he started The Chronicle, a political and literary organ of liberal Catholicism. The first issue appeared on 23 March 1867, but its outspoken support for the Irish Home Rule movement made it unpopular. The last issue was published on 13 February 1868.

Blennerhasset sat as a Liberal Member of Parliament for Galway Borough from 1865 to 1874 and for County Kerry from 1880 to 1885. He was High Sheriff of Kerry in 1866. His early support for Home Rule turned into opposition during the 1870s and he spoke openly against the politics of Charles Stewart Parnell. After leaving Parliament, Blennerhassett continued to be active in Irish public affairs. He contributed regularly to The Times and The Daily Telegraph and was a Justice of the Peace. In 1905, he was sworn of the Privy Council of Ireland.

In October 1901 he was awarded an honorary doctorate (LL.D.) by the Royal University of Ireland.

== Family ==
He met Countess Charlotte Julia von Leyden and married her the same year on 9 June 1870. His wife was a noted biographer.

He was succeeded in his title by his eldest son, Arthur Charles Francis Bernard Blennerhassett. His only daughter, Marie Carola Franciska Roselyne Blennerhassett, married Baron Raphael d'Erlanger and later Sir Henry Galway.

Blennerhassett went bankrupt in 1895; the family wealth lost, subsequent generations had to earn a living- his son and heir, the 5th baronet, was in the Colonial Service, the 6th baronet was an engineer, and the 7th baronet trained as a geologist, was the "front man for a foreign-owned investment firm in the City", and sold computer systems from his Chiswick home.

== Notes ==
Parliament of the United Kingdom
Preceded by John Orrell Lever; Ulick Canning de Burgh	Member of Parliament for Galway Borough; 1865 – 1874; With: Michael Morris; George Morris; William St Lawrence	Succeeded by Frank Hugh O'Donnell; George Morris
Preceded by Henry Arthur Herbert; Rowland Blennerhassett	Member of Parliament for County Kerry; 1880 – 1885; With: Rowland Blennerhassett	Constituency abolished
Baronetage of the United Kingdom
Preceded by Arthur Blennerhassett	Baronet (of Blennerville); 1849 – 1909	Succeeded by Arthur Blennerhassett
