= Michael Francis Ward =

Irish doctor, surgeon, politician and nationalist MP (1845–1881)

Michael Francis Ward (1845 – 17 June 1881) was an Irish medical doctor, surgeon, politician, and nationalist MP in the House of Commons of the United Kingdom of Great Britain and Ireland and as member of the Home Rule League represented Galway Borough from 1874 until 1880.

Ward was born in Galway in 1845, the son of Timothy Ward, a city merchant, and his wife Catherine (née Lynch). He was educated at Summerhill College at Athlone, and at Queen's College Galway which he entered in 1861 to study medicine. He was elected auditor of the college's Literary and Debating Society for the 1866-1867 session. Ward left Galway to continue his medical studies at Dr Steevens' Hospital in Dublin, under the auspices of the Catholic University. He became a Licentiate of the Royal College of Surgeons in Ireland in 1868, and returned to Galway as Demonstrator of Anatomy at the Queen's College. Ward resigned from this post in 1870 on foot of a controversy surrounding the Literary and Debating Society, then under the auditorship of his brother, Peter Ward.

Leaving Galway, Ward took up a position as surgeon to the Infirmary for Children at Buckingham Street in Dublin and later became curator of the Catholic University Anatomical Museum. He was election agent for his college contemporary Frank Hugh O'Donnell when O'Donnell contested the Galway constituency in the 1874 general election and, when O'Donnell was unseated by the courts, Ward successfully contested the ensuing by-election as an agreed Home Rule League candidate, winning with 726 votes to the Liberal candidate's 288. Ward represented Galway in the House of Commons until the 1880 election when, on the dissolution of Parliament, his whereabouts could not be established; in his place, his friend and another school and university contemporary T.P. O'Connor contested and won the Galway seat. Writing in 1929, O'Connor, who had been in the House of Commons for 49 years, said of Ward that 'There have been many curious figures in the House of Commons, and many tragedies of which the public know little, but assuredly never was there a stranger Member than this old friend of mine'. He provided a detailed character portrait, and also commented that in 1874 Ward found himself a Member of Parliament 'very much to his surprise, also to his dissatisfaction'.

Ward accepted an offer of a position on the Government Medical Service in Demerara in 1881. He died shortly after arriving in the colony, on 17 June 1881.

== Notes ==
Parliament of the United Kingdom
Preceded by Frank Hugh O'Donnell; George Morris	Member of Parliament for Galway Borough; June 1874–1880; With: George Morris	Succeeded by T. P. O'Connor; John Orrell Lever
