= Michael McCarthy (Irish lawyer) =

Irish lawyer and anti-clerical author

Michael John Fitzgerald McCarthy (born in Midleton, County Cork (1864 – 26 October 1928) was an Irish lawyer and an anti-clerical author.

== Youth ==
McCarthy was the son of Denis and Catherine McCarthy. In 1887 he married Margaret Ronayne of Donickmore, near Midleton. He was educated at the Vincentian seminary in Cork City, at Midleton College and took a B.A. at Trinity College Dublin in 1885. In 1887 he was called to the Irish Bar.

== Author ==
Notably and almost uniquely for an Irish nationalist, McCarthy was opposed to the increasing social influence of the Roman Catholic Church in Ireland, on the approach to Irish independence. As the Catholic Church still controls most Irish schools and universities, his books and independent stance have not received much attention in the last century. They were best-sellers in their day, having an influence on commentators such as James Joyce. He described his books on Ireland as sociology. He also wrote a novel (Gallowglass) and a book on the emerging power of Japan in 1905.

His method was to extract statistics showing how Irish poverty from the 1870s was largely caused by the large donations often made by poor and undereducated Irish Catholics to the Church. He worried that nobody was prepared to criticise the way the Church spent its money, and that its emphasis on religious devotion was sapping the self-reliance of the population. He mentioned that though the Irish Catholic population had slowly declined by 27% between 1861 and 1901, the number of its priests, nuns and bishops had increased by 137%. Given his Catholic middle-class family background and early training in a seminary, he had a particular insight into the mindset of his Church at the time.

With regard to Church-run industrial schools, he reported that the per-capita annual amounts paid by the British government to the Church were greater than the fees charged by private Catholic boarding schools. He deplored that the Dublin administration exercised little oversight in the Church's spending of public money and its management of publicly funded schools and other institutions.

== Influence ==
McCarthy's anti-clerical views were shared by and influenced the later works of Frank Hugh O'Donnell, and the English socialist Harry Quelch. His statistics were also used by Irish loyalists who were worried that Home Rule would become "Rome Rule". So trenchant were his arguments that McCarthy came to oppose Home Rule before 1910, and the eventual creation of the Irish Free State in 1922.

Several of his anti-clerical works were influential on James Joyce, according to Joyceian academics, and he owned a copy of "The Irish Revolution" (1912).

== Bibliography ==
- Mr Balfour's rule in Ireland; Dublin: Hodges & Figgis 1891;
- Five Years in Ireland 1896-1900 (1901); London: Simpkin, Marshall, Hamilton, Kent; Dublin: Hodges & Figgis 1901 (10th edition 1903);
- Priests and People in Ireland (1902), London: Simpkin, Marshall, Hamilton, Kent; Dublin: Hodges & Figgis 1902; 5th edn. 1905, paperback edn. 1908;
- Rome in Ireland (1904) London: Hodder & Stoughton 1904;
- Gallowglass (1904)
- Catholicity and Progress (1905);
- Catholic Ireland and Protestant Scotland (1905) Edinburgh & London: Oliphant, Anderson & Ferrier 1905;
- The Coming Power: A Contemporary History of the Far East (1905);
- Church and State in England and Wales (1906);
- The Jesuits and the British Press (1910);
- Irish Land and Irish Liberty (1911) London: Scott 1911;
- The Nonconformist Treason, or the Sale of the Emerald Isle (1912);
- The Irish Revolution, Vol. 1 (Edinburgh & London: Blackwood 1912);
- The Dictators (1913);
- The British Monarchy and the See of Rome (1924);
- The Irish Papal State (1925);
- Church and Empire Breaking (1927);
- Anglo-Irish Bolshevism (1927);
- The Bishops and the Houses of Commons (1928).
