= Richard Pigott =

Irish journalist (1835-1889)

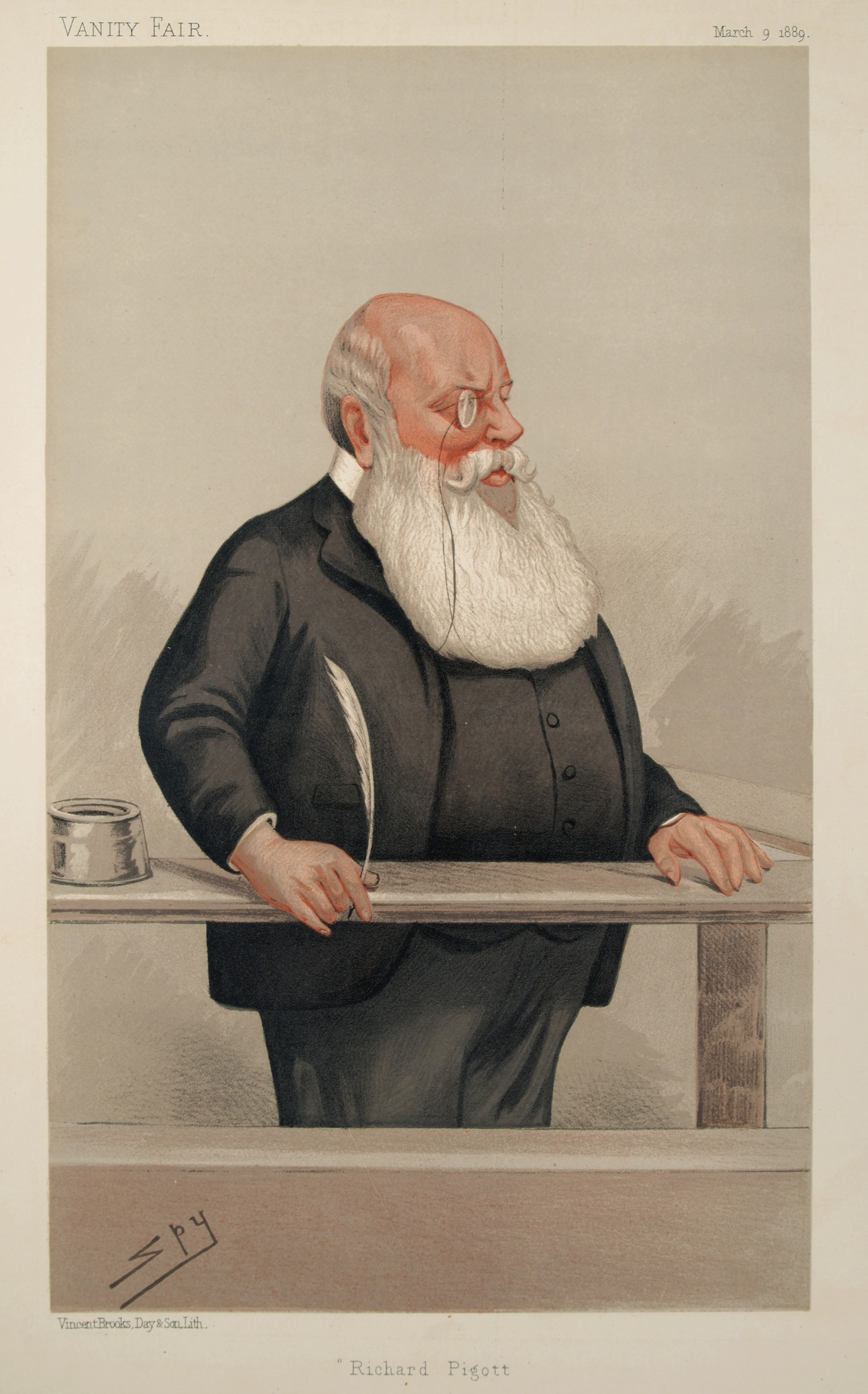
- Pigott as caricatured by Spy (Leslie Ward) in Vanity Fair, March 1889
- Born: 1835; Ratoath, County Meath, Ireland
- Died: 1 March 1889 (aged 53–54); Madrid, Spain
- Cause of death: Suicide
- Occupation: Journalist
- Known for: The 'Pigott Papers' forgery

Richard Pigott (1835 – 1 March 1889) was an Irish journalist, best known for his forging of evidence that Charles Stewart Parnell of the Irish National Land League had been sympathetic to the perpetrators of the Phoenix Park Murders. Parnell successfully sued for libel and Pigott shot himself.

== Journalist ==
Richard Pigott was born in Ratoath, County Meath, in 1835. As a young man he supported Irish nationalism and worked on the publications The Nation and The Tablet before acting as manager of The Irishman, a newspaper founded by Denis Holland. James O'Connor later claimed Pigott embezzled funds from The Irishman (Holland, who had no business sense, left its affairs to Pigott) and covered his tracks by not keeping written records. Pigott also worked for the Irish National Land League, departing in 1883 after accusing its treasurer, Mr Fagan, of being unable to account for £100,000 (equivalent to £10,500,000 in 2025) of its funds and for keeping inadequate records. Nothing was done about his accusation and Pigott turned against the League, which was allied to the Irish Parliamentary Party led by the League's president, Charles Stewart Parnell.

== The forgeries ==
In 1879 Pigott was proprietor of three newspapers, which he soon sold to the League. Hitherto a zealous nationalist, from 1884 onwards Pigott vilified his former associates and sold information to their political opponents. In an effort to destroy Parnell's career, Pigott forged several letters which purported that Parnell had supported the perpetrators of the Phoenix Park murders of 1882.

The Times bought Pigott's forgeries for £1,780 (equivalent to £202,000 in 2025) and published the most damning letter on 18 April 1887. Parnell immediately denounced it as "a villainous and barefaced forgery". In February 1889, the Parnell Commission vindicated him by proving that the letters were fake. They included misspellings (specifically 'hesitency [sic]') which Pigott had written elsewhere. A libel action instituted by Parnell also vindicated him, and his parliamentary career survived the Pigott accusations.

The Commission eventually produced thirty-seven volumes in evidence, covering not just the forgeries but also the surrounding violence that followed from the Plan of Campaign.

After admitting his forgeries to Henry Labouchère, Pigott fled to Spain and shot himself in a Madrid hotel room. Parnell then sued The Times for libel, and the newspaper paid him £5,000 (equivalent to £556,000 in 2025) in an out-of-court settlement, as well as considerably more in legal fees. When Parnell next entered the House of Commons, he received a hero's reception from his fellow Members of Parliament.

== Personal life ==
At the time of Pigott's death he had four sons aged six, seven, twelve and thirteen years.

== Publications ==
- Pigott, Richard (1883). Personal Recollections of an Irish National Journalist. Dublin: Hodges, Figgis, & Co.
- — (1889). O'Connor, James (ed.). Recollections of Richard Pigott. Dublin: M. H. Gill and Son.
