= T. P. O'Connor =

British politician (1848–1929)

The Right Honourable T. P. O'Connor PC
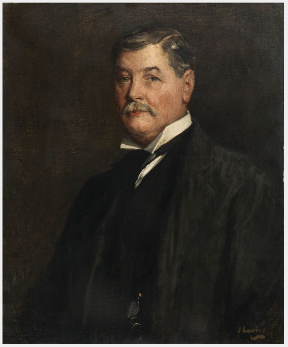

Father of the House of Commons
- In office 14 December 1918 – 18 November 1929
- Speaker: James Lowther; John Henry Whitley; Edward FitzRoy
- Preceded by: Thomas Burt
- Succeeded by: David Lloyd George

Member of Parliament for Liverpool Scotland
- In office 18 December 1885 – 18 November 1929
- Preceded by: New constituency
- Succeeded by: David Logan

Member of Parliament for Galway Borough
- In office 27 April 1880 – 18 December 1885 Serving with John Orrell Lever
- Preceded by: George Morris; Michael Francis Ward
- Succeeded by: William Henry O'Shea

Personal details
- Born: 5 October 1848 Athlone, County Westmeath, Ireland
- Died: 18 November 1929 (aged 81) Westminster, London, England
- Resting place: St Mary's Catholic Cemetery, Kensal Green, London
- Party: Irish Parliamentary Party (1882–1929); Home Rule League (1880–1882)
- Spouse: Elizabeth Howard (m. 1885)
- Education: Queen's College Galway

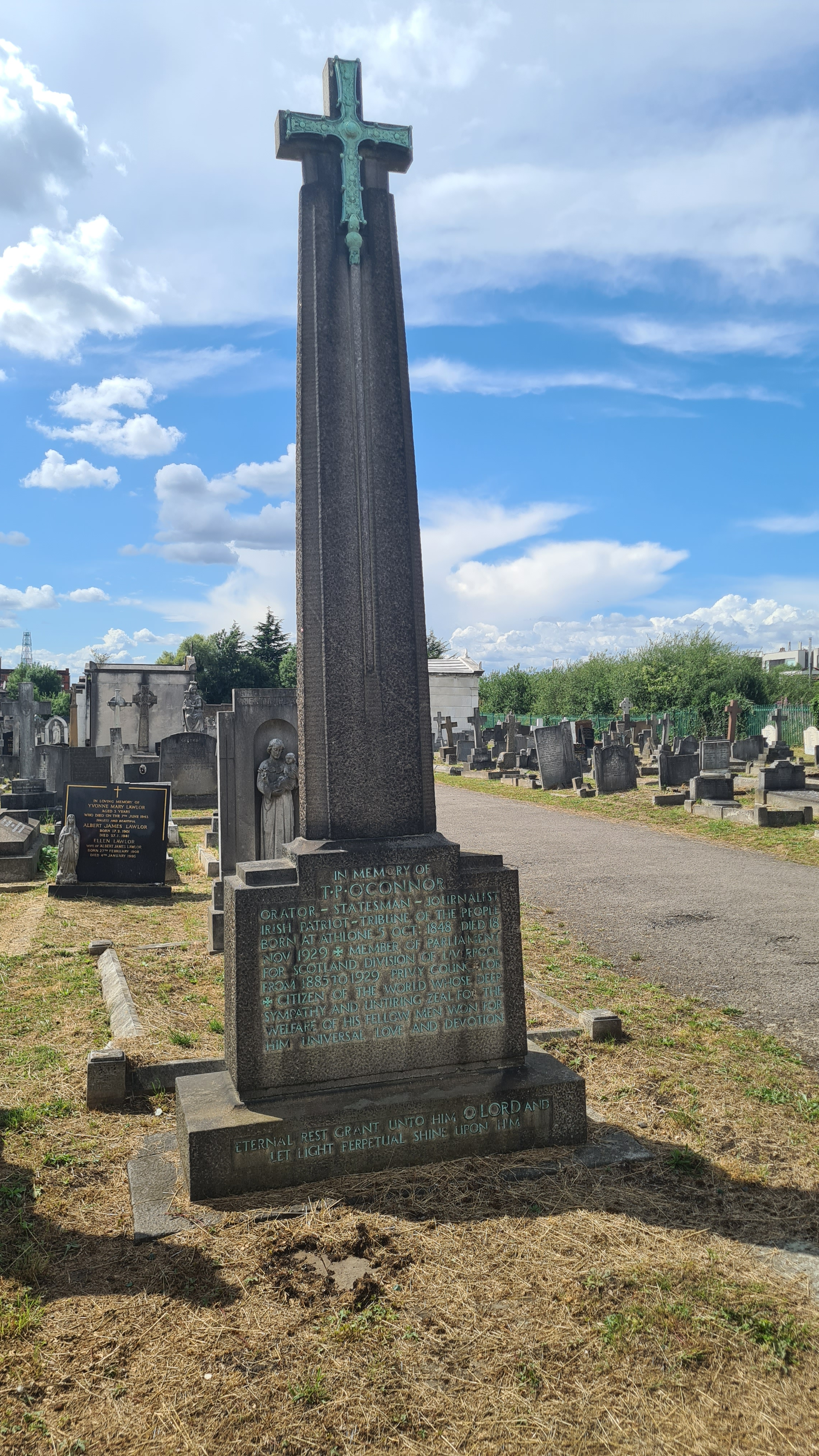
Tomb of T. P. O'Connor at St Mary's Catholic Cemetery, Kensal Green, London

Thomas Power O'Connor, PC (5 October 1848 – 18 November 1929), known as T. P. O'Connor and occasionally as Tay Pay (mimicking the Irish pronunciation of the initials T. P.), was an Irish nationalist politician and journalist who served as a Member of Parliament (MP) in the House of Commons of the United Kingdom of Great Britain and Ireland for nearly fifty years.

== Early life and education ==
O'Connor was born in Athlone, County Westmeath, on 5 October 1848. He was the eldest son of Thomas O'Connor, an Athlone shopkeeper, and his wife Teresa (née Power), the daughter of a non-commissioned officer in the Connaught Rangers. His family were supporters of the Liberal Party. He was educated at the College of the Immaculate Conception in Athlone, and Queen's College Galway, where he won scholarships in history and modern languages and built up a reputation as an orator, serving as auditor of the college's Literary and Debating Society.

== Career ==
From 1867, O'Connor attempted unsuccessfully to gain a position in the Civil Service before working for the Royal Irish Constabulary as a reporting assistant on nationalist political demonstrations. He entered journalism as a junior reporter on Saunders' Newsletter, a Dublin journal. In 1870, he moved to London, and was appointed a sub-editor on The Daily Telegraph, principally on account of the utility of his mastery of French and German in reportage of the Franco-Prussian War. He later became London correspondent for The New York Herald. He compiled the society magazine Mainly About People (M.A.P.) from 1898 to 1911.

O'Connor was elected Member of Parliament for Galway Borough in the 1880 general election, as a representative of the Home Rule League (which was under the leadership of William Shaw, though virtually led by Charles Stewart Parnell, who would win the party's leadership a short time later). O'Connor had been invited to stand as the Liberal candidate for the constituency on the strength of the unflattering biography of then Conservative Prime Minister Benjamin Disraeli he had written in 1878. However, after being persuaded by Parnell, O'Connor stood reluctantly as an Irish party candidate. Despite opposition from Irish Catholic clergymen to the selection of the reputedly agnostic O'Connor as the Irish Nationalist candidate, he won the seat - allegedly with some support from the Irish Republican Brotherhood - because of his vocal support for the ideals of the Irish National Land League. By now a permanent resident of London, who spoke with a London accent, he did not generally speak at land rallies but was appointed to the Land League executive by Parnell. He also made four visits to the U.S. to raise funds for his party from politically engaged Irish Americans.

At the next general election in 1885, O'Connor was returned both for Galway and for the Liverpool Scotland constituencies, which had a large Irish population. He chose to sit for Liverpool, and represented that constituency in the House of Commons from 1885 until his death in 1929. He remains the only British MP from an Irish nationalist party ever to be elected to a constituency outside of the island of Ireland. O'Connor continued to be re-elected in Liverpool under this label unopposed in the 1918, 1922, 1923, 1924 and 1929 general elections, despite the declaration of a de facto Irish Republic in early 1919, and the establishment by 1921 treaty of a quasi-independent Irish Free State in late 1922.

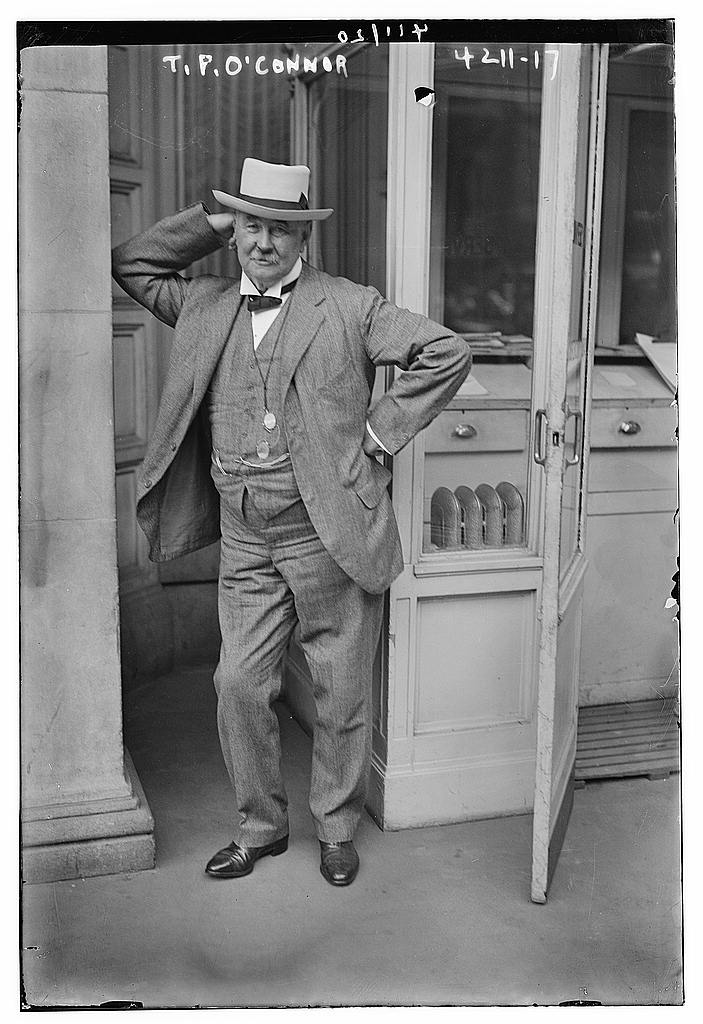
T. P. O'Connor in 1917

From 1905, he belonged to the central leadership of the United Irish League. Although in his later years he was often criticised for distancing himself from the Irish community, he remained the most prominent Irish nationalist politician in Great Britain, and was on close terms with each successive government, and with David Lloyd George in particular. During much of his time in parliament, he wrote a nightly sketch of proceedings there for the Pall Mall Gazette. He was a highly popular and respected figure among MPs from all parties. At the 1918 general election, following the retirement of Liberal-Labour MP Thomas Burt, O'Connor became "Father of the House of Commons", and ultimately would achieve unbroken service of 49 years, 215 days.

O'Connor supported the Irish Reform Association, and by the 1910s, he had come to accept the idea of partition. Having drawn the admiration of even the Ulster Unionist leader Sir Edward Carson, he played a leading role in the Irish Convention in 1917. The Irish Nationalist Party ceased to exist effectively after the Sinn Féin landslide of 1918, and thereafter O'Connor effectively sat as an independent, although from the early 1910s, he had been rallying Irish people in Great Britain behind the Labour Party. On 13 April 1920, O'Connor warned the House of Commons that the death on hunger strike of Thomas Ashe would galvanise opinion in Ireland and unite all Irishmen in opposition to British rule. Just before the 1921 Northern Ireland general election O'Connor made clear his feelings on nationalist participation in the Parliament of Northern Ireland: "...the Nationalists are determined not to give even the fig leaf of respectability to the whole rotten arrangement by attending the [northern] Parliament." He nonetheless supported the 1921 Anglo-Irish Treaty, although he subsequently appealed in vain to the British government to moderate its demand for a substantial contribution from the newly created Irish Free State to the imperial exchequer.

O'Connor was appointed to the Privy Council by the first Labour government in the 1924 Birthday Honours. However, he declined Lloyd George's offer of a hereditary barony, considering the House of Lords to be an elitist institution. On his eightieth birthday in 1928, O'Connor was invited to dine with King George V, and continued to attend parliamentary debates until his death.

=== Newspapers and journals ===
T. P. O'Connor founded and was the first editor of several newspapers and journals: The Star, the Weekly Sun (1891), The Sun (1893), M.A.P. and T.P.'s Weekly (1902). He was also a Fellow of the Chartered Institute of Journalists, the world's oldest journalists' organisation. It continues to honour him by having a T.P. O'Connor charity fund. In August 1906, O'Connor was instrumental in the passing by Parliament of the Musical Copyright Act 1906, also known as the T.P. O'Connor Bill, following many of the popular music writers at the time dying in poverty due to extensive piracy by gangs during the piracy crisis of sheet music in the early 20th century. The gangs would often buy a copy of the music at full price, copy it, and resell it, often at half the price of the original. The film I'll Be Your Sweetheart (1945), commissioned by the British Ministry of Information, is based on the events of the day.

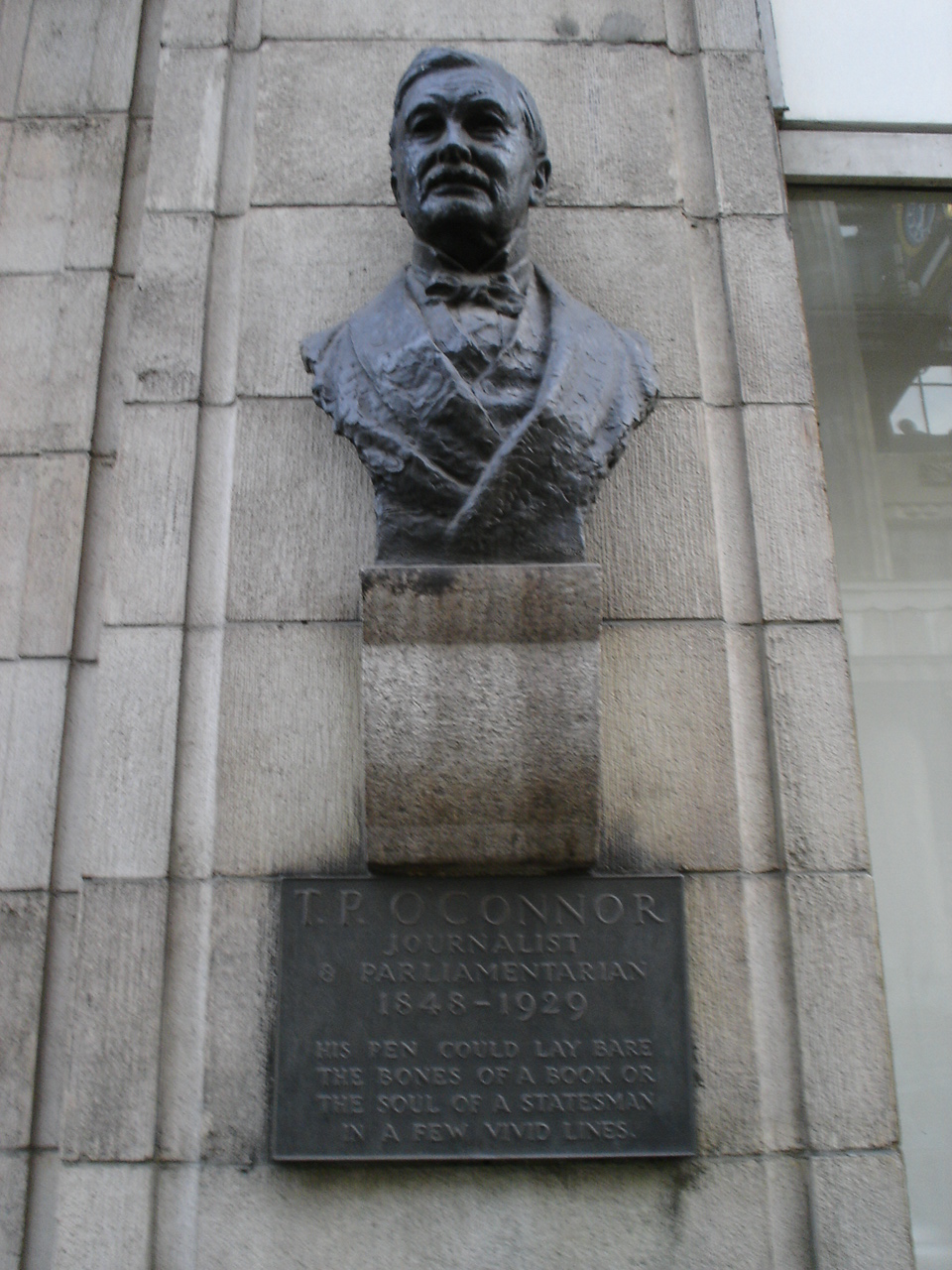
Bust of journalist and politician T. P. O'Connor in Fleet Street, London. The inscription reads, "His pen could lay bare the bones of a book or the soul of a statesman in a few vivid lines."

He was appointed as the second president of the Board of Film Censors in 1916 and appeared in front of the Cinema Commission of Inquiry (1916), set up by the National Council of Public Morals where he outlined the BBFC's position on protecting public morals by listing forty-three infractions, from the BBFC 1913–1915 reports, on why scenes in a film may be cut.

== Publications ==
- Lord Beaconsfield – A Biography (1879);
- The Parnell Movement (1886);
- Gladstone's House of Commons (1885);
- Napoleon (1896);
- The Phantom Millions (1902);
- Memoirs of an Old Parliamentarian (1929).

== Personal life ==
In 1885, O'Connor married American woman Elizabeth Howard (née Paschal), whose father was Arkansas Supreme Court associate justice George W. Paschal. They had no children, rarely lived together, and had separated permanently some time before World War I broke out; however, they remained married until O'Connor's death.

== Death ==
O'Connor fell seriously ill in 1929; a substantial collection for him was raised in the House of Commons. He died at his flat in Westminster on 18 November 1929 and is buried at St Mary's Catholic Cemetery, Kensal Green in north-west London. He was the last Father of the House to die as a sitting MP until Sir Gerald Kaufman in 2017.

== Bibliography ==
- Boyce, D George (1982). Nationalism in Ireland. London.
- Cottrell, Peter (2008). Irish Civil War, 1922–23. Botley, Oxford.
- Walsh, Maurice (2008). The News from Ireland: Foreign Correspondents and the Irish Revolution. London.
- Wilson, Trevor, ed. (1970). The Political Diaries of C.P.Scott 1911–1928. London.

Parliament of the United Kingdom
Preceded by George Morris; Michael Francis Ward	Member of Parliament for Galway Borough; 1880–1885; With: John Orrell Lever	Succeeded by William Henry O'Shea
New constituency	Member of Parliament for Liverpool Scotland; 1885–1929	Succeeded by David Logan
Political offices
Preceded by Thomas Burt	Father of the House; 1918–1929	Succeeded by David Lloyd George
Preceded by Sir James Agg-Gardner	Oldest Member of Parliament; 1928–1929	Succeeded by C. W. Bowerman
Media offices
Preceded by New position	Editor of The Star; 1888–1890	Succeeded by Henry W. Massingham
Preceded by George A. Redford	President of the British Board of Film Censors; 1916–1929	Succeeded by Edward Shortt
