= John Orrell Lever =

English shipping owner and politician

John Orrell Lever MP
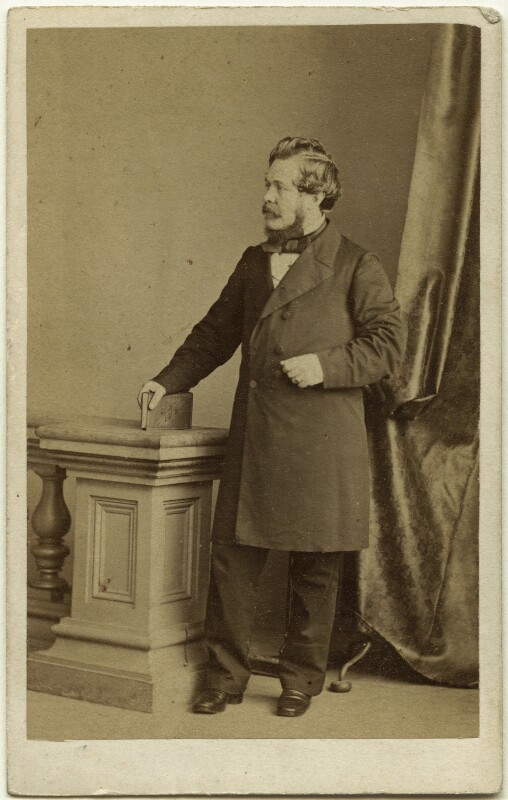

Member of Parliament for Galway Borough
- In office 1859–1865
- Preceded by: Thomas Nicholas Redington
- In office 1880–1885

Personal details
- Born: 1824
- Died: 4 August 1897 (aged 72–73)
- Party: Conservative
- Spouse: Elizabeth Dorning

John Orrell Lever (1824 – 4 August 1897) was an English shipping owner and politician who sat in the House of Commons in two periods between 1859 and 1885.

Lever was the eldest son of James Lever of Manchester, and the descendant of Sir Ashton Lever. He was interested in railways and shipping, being a director of the South Wales Railway and the Atlantic Royal Mail Steam Navigation Co. He was responsible for establishing Galway as a packet-station. He was the sole lessee of the Thames and Channel Passenger Service and wrote several works.

== Business ==
Lever had diverse business interests, including cotton, linen, and corn mills in Lancashire and Ireland, the exports of finished products from Liverpool, and especially steam shipping. During the Crimean War, he created several charter companies with Thomas Howard to ship soldiers and supplies to the war. This wartime activity led to a large profit. He and other investors established the Galway Line, a transatlantic shipping company. He considered establishing a transatlantic cable, but was unable to do so. Lever and his partners did successfully manage to lobby for several transatlantic mail contracts between Great Britain and Canada.

== Member of Parliament ==
In February 1859, Lever was elected at a by-election as a Member of Parliament (MP) for Galway Borough. During the campaign for his first election, he claimed that "as a result of his coming to Galway men's wages had doubled from one to two shillings a day and that he looked forward to the time when they would receive double that again. He wanted to see every man, woman and child in Galway well fed, well clad, and well housed; their children well educated; bonnets on the heads of the working men's wives, good boots and stockings on their feet, and a twelve pound leg of mutton in their kitchen ranges every Sunday and Thursday, with all the appropriate accompaniments." He was re-elected at the general election in May 1859, but was defeated at the 1865 general election.

At the 1880 general election he was re-elected for Galway, and held the seat until the 1885 general election.

He was elected as a Conservative in 1859, and stood as Conservative in 1865. At the 1880 election, Walker records him as a Home Rule League candidate, but Debrett's in 1881 describes as a Liberal-Conservative.

Lever died at the age of 73.

Lever married Elizabeth Dorning, daughter of Jonathan Dorning of Swinton Lancashire in 1847. She died in 1877.

Parliament of the United Kingdom
Preceded by Lord Dunkellin; 2nd seat vacant since void election in 1857	Member of Parliament for Galway Borough; 1859 – 1865; With: Lord Dunkellin	Succeeded by Michael Morris; Sir Rowland Blennerhassett, Bt
Preceded by George Morris; Michael Francis Ward	Member of Parliament for Galway Borough; 1880 – 1885; With: T. P. O'Connor	Succeeded by T. P. O'Connor
