= Plan of Campaign =

Irish stratagem against absentee landlords

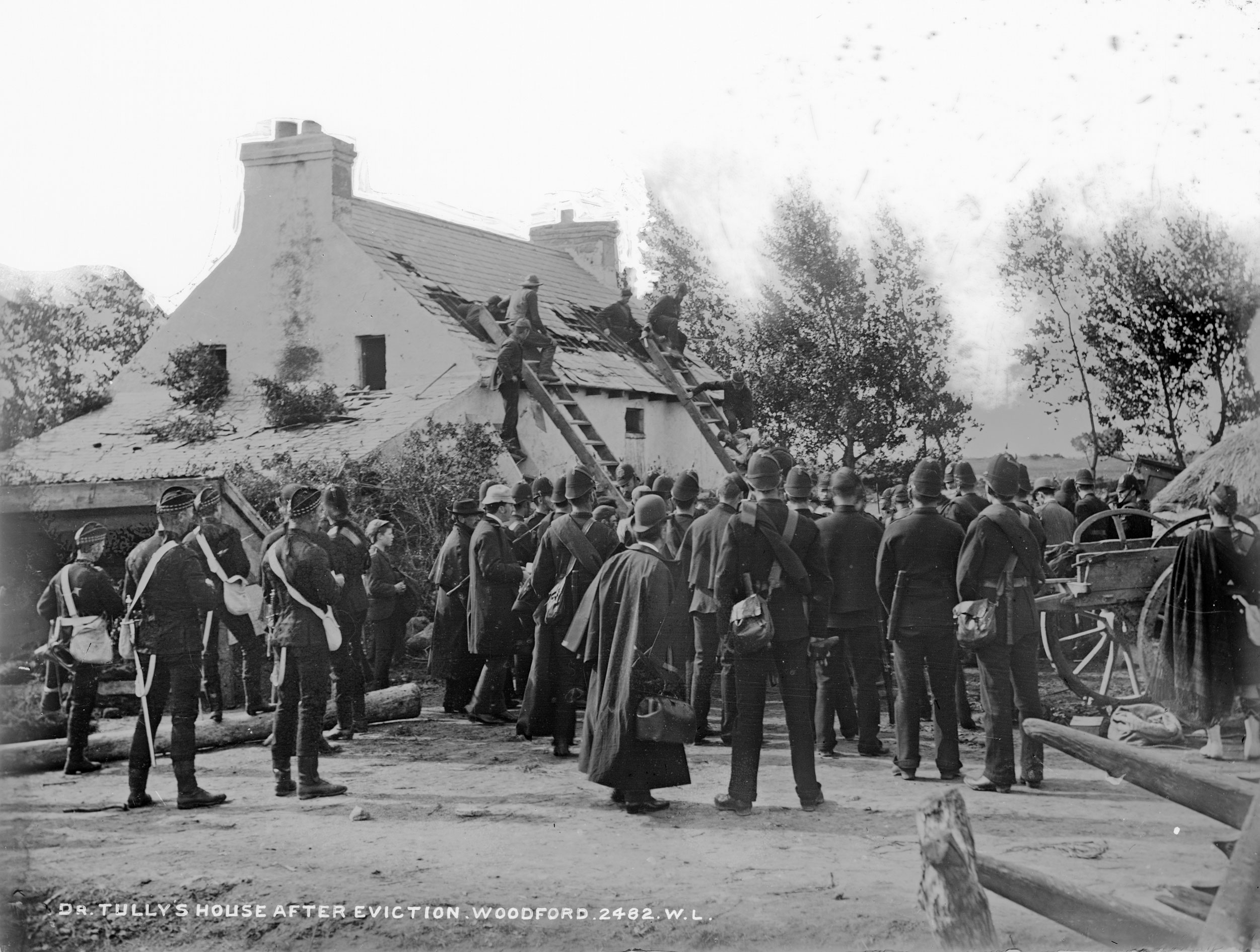
Eviction scene, Woodford, County Galway, 1888, during the Plan of Campaign. The Woodford evictions would become some of the most highly resisted with numerous pamphlets, during the period, referring to them. Further photographs of evictions at Woodford, are available.

The Plan of Campaign was a stratagem adopted in Ireland between 1886 and 1891, co-ordinated by Irish politicians for the benefit of tenant farmers, against mainly absentee and rack-rent landlords. It was launched to counter agricultural distress caused by the continual depression in prices of dairy products and cattle from the mid-1870s, which left many tenants in arrears with rent. Bad weather in 1885 and 1886 also caused crop failure, making it harder to pay rents. The Land War of the early 1880s was about to be renewed after evictions increased and outrages became widespread.

== Drastic measures ==
The Plan, conceived by Timothy Healy, was devised and organised by Timothy Harrington secretary of the Irish National League, William O'Brien and John Dillon. It was outlined in an article headed Plan of Campaign by Harrington which was published on 23 October 1886 in the League's newspaper, the United Irishman of which O'Brien was editor. The purpose of the Plan was to secure a reduction of rent where tenants considered themselves overburdened in consequence of a poor harvest: if a landlord refused to accept a reduced rent, the tenants were to pay no rent at all. The rents were then collected by campaigners who banked them in the name of a National League committee of trustees and were to be used to assist evicted tenants who had risked eviction in the hope of rapid fair-rent reinstatement.

A Land Commission had been established under the Land Law (Ireland) Act 1881 to review and reduce rents where they were clearly unpayable, securing an average reduction of 25%. The Campaign sought to further reduce the amounts by concerted action, and ideally by negotiation.

The measures were to be put into operation on 203 estates, mainly in the south and west of the country though including some scattered Ulster estates. Initially sixty landlords accepted the reduced rents, twenty-four holding out but then agreeing the tenant conditions. Tenants gave in on fifteen estates. The chief trouble occurred on the remaining large estates. The organisers of the Plan decided to test a number of these expecting the remainder would then give in. Widespread attention was focused on it being implemented by Dillon and O'Brien on the estate of the Marquess of Clanricarde at Portumna, County Galway (19 November 1886), where the landlord was an absentee ascendancy landlord. The estate comprising 52,000 acres (210 km^{2}), or 21,000 hectare, yielded 25,000 sterling yearly in rents paid by 1,900 tenants. The hard-pressed tenants looked for a reduction of twenty-five percent. The landlord refused to give any abatement. The tenant's reduced rents were then placed into an estate fund, and the landlord informed he would only receive the monies when he agreed to the reduction. Tenants on other estate then followed the example of the Clanricarde tenants, the Plan on each estate led by a member of the Irish Parliamentary Party Campaign activists including Pat O'Brien, Alexander Blane or members of its constituency organisation, the National League. Some 20,000 tenants were involved.

== Parnell's dilemma ==
Charles Stewart Parnell, leader of the Irish Parliamentary Party, had been concentrating on winning over the British electorate to Irish Home Rule prior to the November 1885 elections. The election in November saw Parnell with 86 seats holding the balance of power in the House of Commons, and continuing to give loose support to Lord Salisbury's Conservative government. William Gladstone, leader of the Liberal Party committed himself to introducing Home Rule as "justice for Ireland". Parnell switched the support of his MPs to the Liberals; Gladstone formed his third government and then introduced the First Irish Home Rule Bill in April 1886. Immediately, Unionists and the Conservative Party mounted opposition throughout Britain. Gladstone's party split on the issue, with his wealthier supporters forming the Liberal Unionist Party. On its second reading in June, the Bill was defeated by 341 seats to 311, and Parliament was dissolved. The ensuing election brought a majority of 118 for the Conservatives and their Liberal Unionist allies over the combined Irish and Liberal members, reflecting the threat felt by Home Rule.

Undaunted, and certain Home Rule's time would yet come, Parnell in the aftermath of the Home Rule Bill dissociated himself from the launching of the Plan of Campaign, after agrarian war flared up again, fearing to identify Home Rule and constitutional nationalism with militant agrarian violence. His more canny supporters wanted to secure the votes of the growing low-to-middle income electorate and felt that their own campaign would head off any support for the more radical Michael Davitt. Essentially they were copying Davitt's earlier methods without his more radical policy.

In December 1886, Lord Salisbury's Conservative government declared the Campaign to be "an unlawful and criminal conspiracy". Parnell, unable to prevent it, persuaded O'Brien to confine it at that stage to the estates upon which it was operating. However, the campaigners had moral support from the Catholic archbishop of Dublin, William Walsh, and from the Archbishop of Cashel, Thomas William Croke. Many other bishops supported it, while opposition was led by the bishop of Limerick, Edward O'Dwyer. A complication for the church was that it had lent money to larger Catholic landlords, such as the Earl of Granard in Longford, who could not pay their mortgage payments to the Church when receiving no rents.

== Coercion Act ==
The renewal of the Land War in the form of the Campaign, was a matter of grave concern to the government and, determined to crush it, Salisbury appointed his nephew, Arthur Balfour, fresh from his attack on the Scottish Land League, to the post of Chief Secretary of Ireland. Balfour secured a tough Irish Coercion Act or Perpetual Crimes Act (1887), aimed at the prevention of boycotting, intimidation, unlawful assembly and the organisation of conspiracies against the payment of rents. The Act resulted in the imprisonment of hundreds of people including over twenty MPs, all of whom had done no more than help evicted tenants. The so-called 'Crimes Act' (or "Coercion" Act) was condemned by the Catholic hierarchy, for it was to become a permanent part of the law and did not have to be renewed annually by parliament. Trial by jury was abolished. Balfour also had the National League declared illegal and its many branches suppressed. He went further and sent armed police and soldiers to evict tenants, using battering rams against small cottages after sieges of several days. These dramatic scenes were reported by the press around the world and aroused much sympathy in Britain for those evicted.

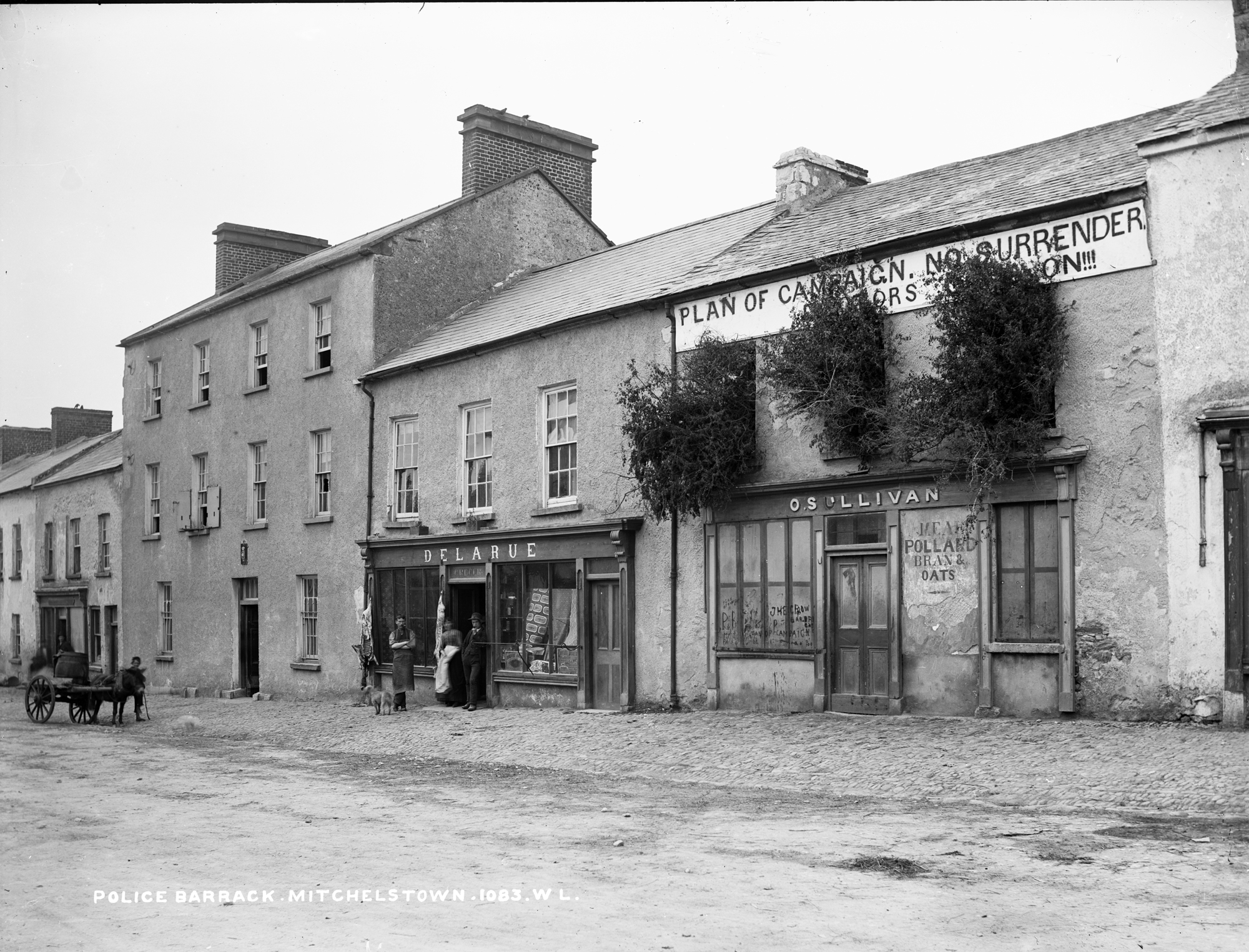
Evicted building in Michelstown 1887 during the Plan of Campaign

Dillon and O'Brien were arrested, and, when their supporters started a public defence fund, Archbishop Croke issued a No Tax Manifesto which prompted Balfour to consider imprisoning him also. Two priests, Fr. Matt Ryan and Fr. Daniel Keller, both within Croke's archdiocese, were imprisoned. Balfour defended Divisional Magistrate Plunkett's injunction to the police under threat: "Do not hesitate to shoot", in the House of Commons. Later in 1887, when O’Brien and a local Tipperary farmer John Mandeville were taken for trial to Mitchelstown, Dillon was present and after he delivered a speech denouncing Balfour, the crowd of 8,000 threw stones at the police, who retreated and then opened fire, killing three people in what became known as the "Mitchelstown Massacre". Balfour defended his subordinates, for which O'Brien dubbed him "Bloody Balfour" in the House of Commons.

The Parnell Commission hearings in 1888–89 exonerated Parnell from involvement with murders in 1882, but also revealed a great amount of violence and intimidation. In hindsight the government felt justified in enacting special criminal laws for special circumstances.

== Papal encyclical ==
The rising crime rate and general unrest forced Balfour to more subtle strategies by seeking Vatican assistance to suppress clergymen involved in the Plan. In answer Pope Leo XIII despatched Archbishop Persico to Ireland, who travelled throughout the country from July 1887 until January 1888, consulting prominent members of the hierarchy. A Papal Rescript (20 April 1888) condemned the Plan and all clerical involvement in it as well as boycotting, followed in June by the papal encyclical "Saepe Nos" that was addressed to all the Irish bishops.

This was openly denounced as an impertinence by the Irish MPs and the clergy itself divided on the issue. A general resentment of the Vatican's intrusion into Irish affairs helped to win some support for the Plan, which was by now in financial difficulties. That ran counter to the Ultramontane policy adopted by Cardinal Cullen since the 1850s, which included total obedience to papal decrees. Suspicion arose that the encyclical was issued in hopes that Britain and the papacy would appoint ambassadors to each other and establish diplomatic relations.

The covering letter with the encyclical was written by Raffaele Monaco La Valletta, Cardinal Secretary of the Holy Office, and included:

"The justice of the decision will be readily seen by anyone who applies his mind to consider that a rent agreed upon by mutual consent cannot, without violation of a contract, be diminished at the mere will of a tenant, especially when there are tribunals appointed for settling such controversies and reducing unjust rents within the bounds of equity after taking into account the causes which diminish the value of the land.... Finally, [regarding boycotting] it is contrary to justice and to charity to persecute by a social interdict those who are satisfied to pay rents agreed upon, or those who, in the exercise of their right, take vacant lands."

"The promulgation of the Papal Rescript, condemning boycotting and the Plan of Campaign as grave offences against the moral law, took Mgr. Persico as much by surprise as it did Cardinal Manning; for both he and the Papal Delegate confidently expected that, in accordance with their joint suggestions, the condemnation of the immoral methods of the League would have been pronounced not directly by the Holy See, but by the Irish Episcopate." Persico returned to Rome much disappointed. He was at once nominated Vicar of the Vatican Chapter.

Persico later commented, "I had no idea that anything had been done about Irish affairs, much less thought that some questions had been referred to the Holy Office, and the first knowledge I had of the decree was on the morning of the 28th April, when I received the bare circular sent me by Propaganda. I must add that had I known of such a thing I would have felt it my duty to make proper representations to the Holy See".

== New Tipperary ==
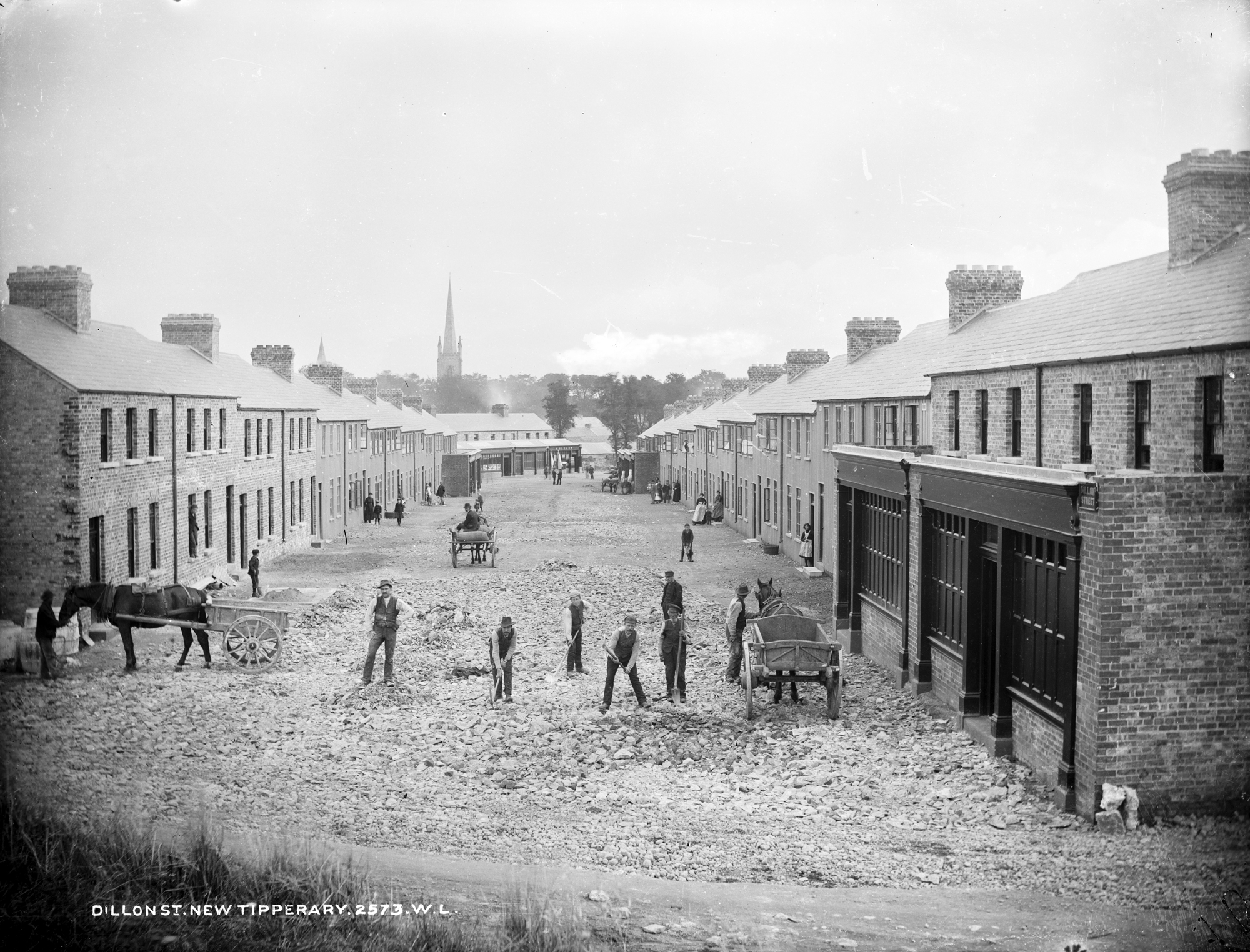
New Tipperary in construction 1890

Balfour encouraged the landlords in 1889 to form an anti-tenant syndicate under the chairmanship of Tipperary landlord and High Sheriff of Cork, Arthur Smith-Barry. As the landlord's agent, Smith-Barry, ennobled as Lord Barrymore, was authorised to buy up estates which were threatened by the Plan and then evict the tenants, which he carried out in the case of the Charles Ponsonby estate in Youghal. This brought him into conflict with his own tenants, largely the tenants of Tipperary town, who in anger refused to pay rents. When evicted they moved with their shops to pursue their livelihoods outside the town boundaries and built 'New' Tipperary under the direction of Fr. David Humphreys and O'Brien, just released from prison. The Tipperary project, comprising two streets with houses, proved too costly for the Plan's leaders and this led to its defeat. By this time Parnell had been induced to give some support which helped in the formation of a Tenants' Defence Association in Tipperary and this, along with Dillon's raised money, enabled the Plan to continue. The organisers had £84,000 in 1890 but this had shrunk to £48,000 within a year, by which time almost 1,500 tenants were receiving grants from the Plan funds.

== Parnell's change of policy ==
The organisation looked unavailingly to Parnell for further help. In the course of a speech he delivered in May 1888 to the Liberal Eighty Club, Parnell, concerned that it would otherwise harm his alliance with the Liberals, virtually renounced his association with the Plan, this disunity with his party a precursor of the more momentous split to come. The organisers were forced to seek financial assistance elsewhere and Dillon embarked on a fund-raising drive in Australia and New Zealand (May 1889 – April 1890) which raised some £33,000, but this was insufficient for their needs. In October Dillon and O'Brien jumped bail and escaped to France, and from there to America where they were empowered by Parnell to raise more money (£61,000, which he intended for the Irish party).

Parnell also had to distance himself from the Campaign during the Parnell Commission hearings in 1888–89. While the main outcome was very favourable to him, much of the surrounding evidence suggested that the organisers of the Campaign and the former Land War had incited, or were complicit in, the attendant violence.

== Victory in principle ==
As Balfour had hoped, the organisers found it difficult to raise enough money to pay stipends to those evicted during the Campaign and now forced to live on party doles. By 1893 the Campaign was over. It had resulted in settlements on eighty-four estates; on fifteen estates the tenants had gone back on the landlords' terms and no settlement had been reached on the remaining. Although the organisers claimed they had been victorious, the price paid was high, the huge expenditure involved, the hardship suffered by those imprisoned under the Coercion Acts (also known as Crimes Acts), the tragedy of those evicted whose farms fell into dire neglect, some not restored to their farms until 1907, and the subsequent embittered relationship between the parties on estates where the landlord had given in.

The Campaign attracted many British and foreign journalists to Ireland as well as Liberal MPs some of whom were imprisoned under the Coercion Acts, which increased sympathy for Home Rule. The Conservative Party as a result of its mishandling lost sympathy among the working classes in Britain. However, a decade later Balfour passed several measures for the benefit of Ireland. He amended and introduced new land acts, encouraged various economic schemes, local industries, extension of the railways and the introduction of local government. His approach, much in keeping with his character, had been from the beginning two-pronged – I shall be as relentless as Cromwell in enforcing obedience to the law, but, at the same time, I shall be as radical as any reformer in redressing grievances and especially in removing every cause of complaint in regard to the land.

== Outcomes ==
In December 1890, following the verdict in the '’O'Shea v O'Shea and Parnell'’ divorce case the IPP split. This diverted attention from the Campaign which slowly petered out. The IPP also wanted to disassociate itself from the more violent aspects on the approach to the Second Home Rule Bill that narrowly succeeded with a majority of 30 in the House of Commons but was then defeated by the House of Lords in 1893.

The Irish land question was addressed after the 1902 Land Conference by the main reforming Land Purchase (Ireland) Act 1903, during Balfour's short tenure as prime minister in 1902–1905, allowing Irish tenant farmers to buy the freehold title to their land with low annuities and affordable government-backed loans.

== See also ==
- Cork Defence Union
