= March 1874 Galway Borough by-election =

UK parliamentary by-election

- 20 March 1874

Constituency of Galway Borough
- Registered: 1,444
- Turnout: 64.9% (▲3.5%)
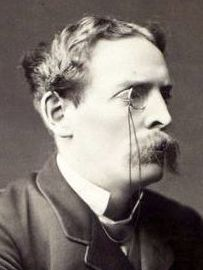
| | First party | Second party |
|---|---|---|
| | | Lib |
| Candidate | Frank Hugh O'Donnell | Pierce Joyce |
| Party | Home Rule | Liberal |
| Popular vote | 579 | 358 |
| Percentage | 61.8% | 38.2% |
MP before election
William St Lawrence
Home Rule
Elected MP
Frank Hugh O'Donnell
Home Rule

The March 1874 Galway Borough by-election was held on 20 March 1874. The by-election was held due to the succession to a peerage of the incumbent Home Rule MP, William St Lawrence. It was won by the Home Rule candidate Frank Hugh O'Donnell. An election petition alleged bribery and intimidation on the part of O'Donnell's supporters, and his election was declared void under the Parliamentary Elections Act 1868. This resulted in another by-election in June.

March 1874 Galway Borough by-election (1 seat)
| Party | Candidate | Votes | % | ±% |
|---|---|---|---|---|
| Home Rule | Frank Hugh O'Donnell | 579 | 61.8 | N/A |
| Liberal | Pierce Joyce | 358 | 38.2 | New |
| Majority | | 221 | 23.6 | +12.7 |
| Turnout | | 937 | 64.9 | +3.5 |
| Registered electors | | 1,444 | | |
| Home Rule hold | | Swing | N/A | |
