= June 1874 Galway Borough by-election =

UK parliamentary by-election

The 1874 Galway Borough by-election was held on 29 June 1874. The by-election was held due to the void election of the incumbent Home Rule MP, Frank Hugh O'Donnell, in the March by-election. It was won by the Home Rule candidate Michael Francis Ward.

June 1874 Galway Borough by-election
Party	Candidate	Votes	%	±%
Home Rule	Michael Francis Ward	726	71.6	N/A
Liberal	James Henry Monahan	288	28.4	N/A
Majority		438	43.2	+32.3
Turnout		1,014	70.2	+8.8
Registered electors		1,444		
Home Rule hold		Swing	N/A	
