= Madison, Georgia =

City in Georgia, United States

- City
- City of Madison
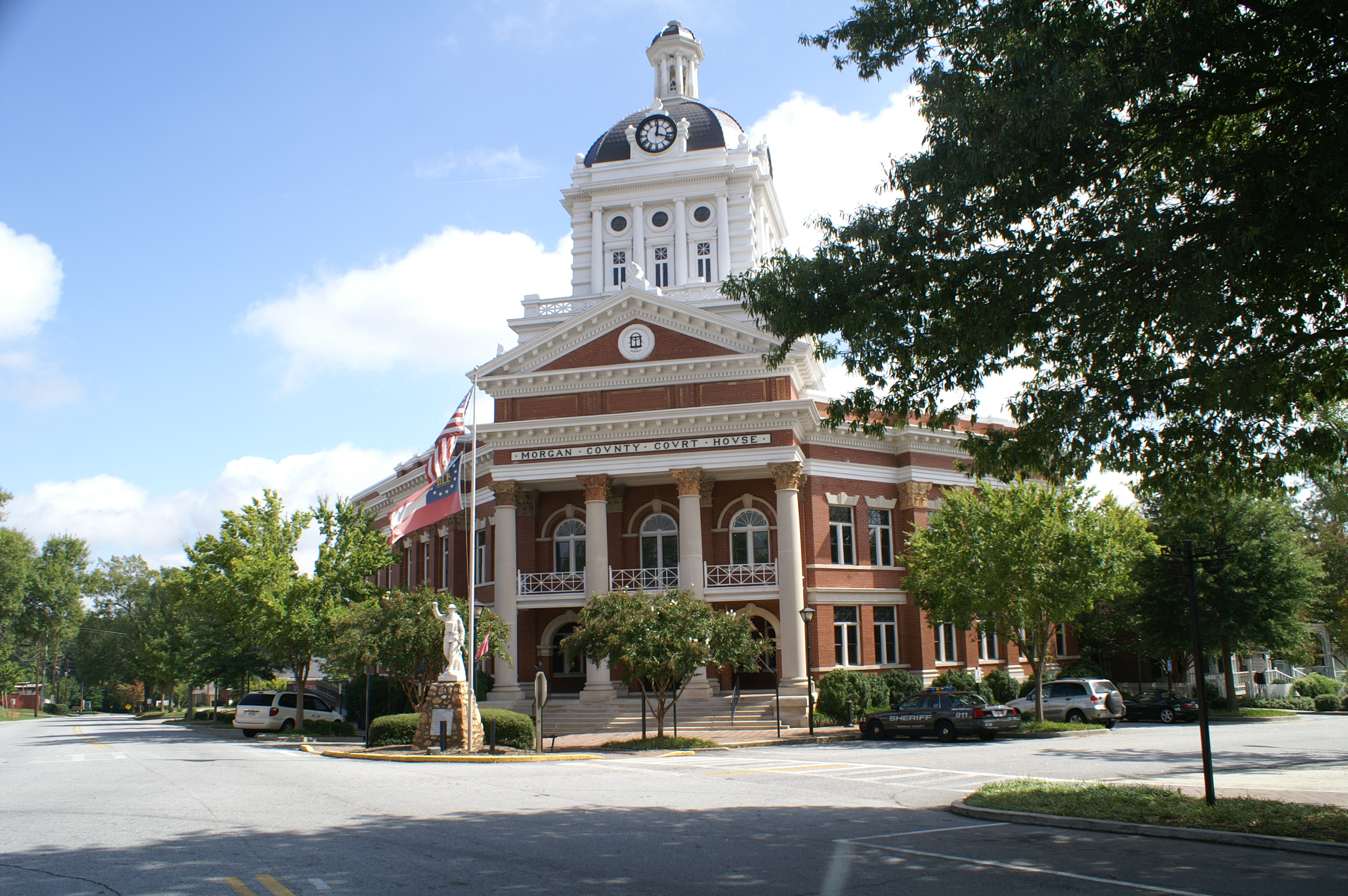
- Morgan County Courthouse in Madison, 2011

- Flag Seal Logo

- Location in Morgan County and the state of Georgia

- Location within the contiguous United States of America
- Coordinates: 33°35′17″N 83°28′21″W
- Country: United States
- State: Georgia
- County: Morgan
- Incorporated: December 12, 1809; 216 years ago
- Named for: James Madison

Government
  - Type: Mayor–Council
  - Mayor: Fred Perriman (D)
  - Council: Members: Carrie Peters-Reid; Eric Joyce; Ed Latham; Rick Blanton – Mayor Pro-Tem; Betsy Wagenhauser

Area
  - Total: 8.86 sq mi (22.94 km^{2})
  - Land: 8.78 sq mi (22.75 km^{2})
  - Water: 0.073 sq mi (0.19 km^{2})
- Elevation: 679 ft (207 m)

Population (2020)
  - Total: 4,447
  - Density: 506.3/sq mi (195.48/km^{2})
- Time zone: UTC-5 (Eastern (EST))
  - Summer (DST): UTC-4 (EDT)
- ZIP code: 30650
- Area code(s): 706
- FIPS code: 13-49196
- GNIS feature ID: 0332303
- Major airport: ATL
- Website: madisonga.com

Madison is a city in Morgan County, Georgia, United States. It is part of the Atlanta-Athens-Clarke-Sandy Springs combined statistical area. The population was 4,447 at the 2020 census, up from 3,979 in 2010. The city is the county seat of Morgan County and the site of the Morgan County Courthouse.

The Madison Historic District is one of the largest in the state. Many of the nearly 100 antebellum homes have been carefully restored. Bonar Hall is one of the first of the grand-style Federal homes built in Madison during the town's cotton-boom heyday from 1840 to 1860.

Budget Travel magazine voted Madison as one of the world's 16 most picturesque villages.

Madison is featured on Georgia's Antebellum Trail, and is designated as one of the state's Historic Heartland cities.

== History ==
=== Early 19th century ===
On December 12, 1809, the town, named for 4th United States president, James Madison, was incorporated. Madison was described in an early 19th-century issue of White's Statistics of Georgia as "the most cultured and aristocratic town on the stagecoach route from Charleston to New Orleans." An 1849 edition of White's Statistics stated, "In point of intelligence, refinement, and hospitality, this town acknowledges no superior."

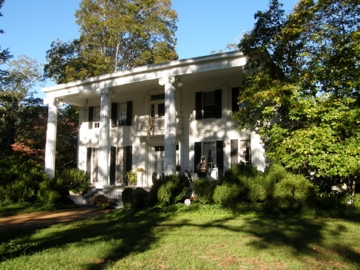
Historic District of Madison, 2010

While many believe that William Tecumseh Sherman spared the town because it was too beautiful to burn during his March to the Sea, the truth is that Madison was home to pro-Union Congressman (later Senator) Joshua Hill. Hill had ties with General Sherman's brother in the House of Representatives, so his sparing the town was more political than appreciation of its beauty.

=== Jim Crow era ===
In 1895 Madison was reported to have an oil mill with a capital of $35,000, a soap factory, a fertilizer factory, four steam ginneries, a mammoth compress, two carriage factories, a furniture factory, a grist and flouringmill, a bottling works, a distillery with a capacity of 120 gallons a day, an ice factory with a capital of $10,500, a canning factory with a capital of $10,000, a bank with a capital of $75,000, surplus $12,000, and a number of small industries operated by individual enterprise. One of the carriage factories was owned and operated by prominent African-American businessman and entrepreneur H. R. Goldwire.

Against the backdrop of this Jim Crow-era prosperity, white Madisonians participated in at least three documented lynchings of African Americans. In February 1890, after a rushed trial involving knife-wielding jurors, Brown Washington, a 15-year-old, was found guilty of the murder of a 9-year-old local white girl. After the verdict, though the sheriff with the governor's approval called up the Madison Home Guard to protect Washington, "only three militiamen and none of the officers" responded to the order. Washington was thus easily taken from jail by a posse of ten men organized by a "leading local businessman". Described as "among the best citizens", they promptly handed him over to a mob of over 300 people waiting outside the courthouse. From there, he was taken to a telegraph pole behind a local residence, allowed a prayer, then strung up and shot, his body mutilated by more than 100 bullets. Afterwards, in the patriarchal exhibition-style common of southern lynchings, a sign was posted on the telegraph pole: "Our women and children will be protected." His body was not taken down until noon the next day.

According to Brundage's account of the lynching of Brown Washington in Lynching in the New South: Georgia and Virginia, 1880-1930:

The open participation of men 'of all ages and standing in life,' the carefully organized public meeting that planned the mob's course of action, the obvious complicity of the militia, and the ritualized execution of Washington all highlight the degree to which the lynching was sanctioned by the community at large. Shared attitudes toward women, sexuality, and black criminality, combined with local bonds of community and family, focused the fears and rage of whites on Washington and guaranteed mass involvement in his execution.

In the aftermath, though local and state authorities vowed to thoroughly investigate the lynching as well as the Madison Home Guard's dereliction of duty, just a week later a grand jury was advised by a judge of the superior court of Madison that any investigation would be a waste of time. In addition, the state body charged with investigating the home guard's non-response reported that their absence had been satisfactorily explained and no tribunal would be convened to investigate the matter."

Although the local Madisonian newspaper failed to report on the 1890 extra-judicial murder of Mr. Washington, an even earlier first lynching by Madisonians of a man they similarly pulled out of the old stone county jail appears in the contemporary accounts from the Atlanta Constitution.

In 1919, ten years after the erection of a Confederate memorial one block from the newly built Morgan County courthouse, another lynching occurred in the dark of night a few days before Thanksgiving. This time, citizens skipped the show-trials altogether, opting to travel to the home of Mr. Wallace Baynes in what one paper of the day called an "arresting party", though no charges against Mr. Baynes were stipulated in the news account. Baynes shot at the party, striking Mr. Frank F. Ozburn of Madison in the head, killing him instantly. In response, the mob outside his home grew to 40-50 men. Despite the arrival of Madison Sheriff C.S. Baldwin, Mr. Baynes was pulled from his home by a rope and shot near the Little River. Afterwards, the sheriff present at the lynching said he could not identify any of the men who came for Mr. Baynes, despite the fact that they arrived in cars and lit up Mr. Baynes' home with the headlights of their vehicles. In an editorial that argued that mobs in the South were no worse than mobs in the North yet condemned future lynchings, the local Madisonian claimed: "There is not now and perhaps will never be, any friction between the races here."

The Confederate monument erected in 1909 by the Morgan County Daughters of the Confederacy one block from the courthouse where Mr. Baynes was not afforded a trial was inscribed in part: "NO NATION ROSE/SO WHITE AND FAIR, NONE FELL SO PURE OF CRIME." In the 1950s, the monument was moved to Hill Park, a Madison city property donated by Bell Hill Knight, daughter of Joshua Hill, the aforementioned pro-Union senator who before the Civil War resigned his position rather than support secession. Mrs. Knight, whose husband Captain Gazaway Knight was Commander of the Panola Guards, a Confederate brigade that was organized in Madison, was a staunch member of the Morgan County Daughters of the Confederacy.

=== Present day ===
Madison has one of the largest historic districts in the state of Georgia, with visitors coming to see the antebellum architecture of the homes. Allie Carroll Hart was instrumental in establishing Madison's historical prestige.

According to the Madison Historic Preservation Commission, "The Madison Historic District is listed in the National Register of Historic Places and is Madison's foremost tourist attraction. Preservation of the district and of each property within its boundary provides for the protection of Madison's unique historic character and quality environment. Madison's preservation efforts reflect a nationwide movement to preserve a 'sense of place' amid generic modern development." The Historic Preservation Commission, appointed by Mayor and Council, is charged with protecting the historic character of the district through review of proposed exterior changes.

== Geography ==
Madison is located in central Morgan County at 33°35′17″N 83°28′21″W (33.588038, -83.472368). According to the United States Census Bureau, the city has a total area of 8.9 square miles (23 km^{2}), of which 0.07 square miles (0.18 km^{2}), or 0.82%, are water.

Madison is situated at an elevation of 691 feet (211 m) on a ridge which traverses Morgan County from the northeast to the southwest. In Madison, the south side of the ridge drains to tributaries of Sugar Creek, which flows southeast to the Oconee River, while the north side drains via Mill Branch to Hard Labor Creek, an east-flowing tributary of the Apalachee River, which continues to the Oconee. The southwest part of the city drains to Little Indian Creek, a tributary of the Little River, which flows to the Oconee north of Milledgeville.

Interstate 20, U.S. Route 129, U.S. Route 441, and U.S. Route 278 pass through Madison. I-20 serves the city from exits 113 and 114, leading east 90 miles (140 km) to Augusta and west 57 miles (92 km) to Atlanta. U.S. 278 runs through the center of the city, leading east 19 miles (31 km) to Greensboro and west 24 miles (39 km) to Covington. U.S. 129/441 run through the city together, leading north 29 miles (47 km) to Athens and south 22 miles (35 km) to Eatonton.

== Demographics ==
Historical population
Census	Pop.	Note	%±
1880	1,974		—
1890	2,131		8.0%
1900	1,992		−6.5%
1910	2,412		21.1%
1920	2,348		−2.7%
1930	1,966		−16.3%
1940	2,045		4.0%
1950	2,489		21.7%
1960	2,680		7.7%
1970	2,890		7.8%
1980	2,954		2.2%
1990	3,483		17.9%
2000	3,636		4.4%
2010	3,979		9.4%
2020	4,447		11.8%
U.S. Decennial Census

=== 2020 census ===
As of the 2020 census, Madison had a population of 4,447, with 1,784 households and 1,121 families.

The median age was 42.6 years. 21.7% of residents were under the age of 18 and 22.1% of residents were 65 years of age or older. For every 100 females there were 84.5 males, and for every 100 females age 18 and over there were 79.7 males age 18 and over.

95.5% of residents lived in urban areas, while 4.5% lived in rural areas.

Of the 1,784 households, 31.3% had children under the age of 18 living in them. Of all households, 36.3% were married-couple households, 16.6% were households with a male householder and no spouse or partner present, and 41.9% were households with a female householder and no spouse or partner present. About 30.0% of all households were made up of individuals, and 15.2% had someone living alone who was 65 years of age or older.

There were 1,942 housing units, of which 8.1% were vacant. The homeowner vacancy rate was 2.1% and the rental vacancy rate was 5.4%.

Madison racial composition as of 2020
Race	Num.	Perc.
White	2,215	49.81%
Black or African American	1,919	43.15%
Native American	9	0.2%
Asian	33	0.74%
Other/Mixed	133	2.99%
Hispanic or Latino	138	3.1%

== Culture and parks ==
Madison is home to a handful of art galleries and museums. The Madison-Morgan Cultural Center (MMCC) provides a regional focus for performing and visual arts, plus permanent exhibits including a historical exhibit of Georgia's Piedmont region. The center occupies an elegantly restored 1895 Romanesque Revival building and is located in the heart of Madison's nationally registered historic district. Athens band R.E.M. recorded an MTV Unplugged session at the center in 1991, where they played "Losing My Religion" with the Atlanta Symphony Orchestra.

The Morgan County African American Museum is located in Madison.

Heritage Hall is maintained by the Morgan County Historical Society and has been restored for its architectural and historical significance. The original portion of Heritage Hall was built in 1811, and it received its Greek Revival façade around 1830. The house was a private residence until 1977.

The Madison Artists' Guild has more than 150 members and is a nonprofit organization dedicated to education and the encouragement of artistic endeavors in its members and its community through planned programs and regular gatherings.

There are five parks in the city limits. Wellington, Gilbert, Lambert, and Hill Park are designated for active play, whereas Town Park is designed for events and public gatherings.

Madison's safari park, Georgia Safari Conservation Park, opened to the public on June 1, 2024.

== Crime ==
According to a 2017 crime report produced by the city's planning and development director, property crime rates in Madison are double and triple of nearby Social Circle and Watkinsville, respectively. Violent crime remained steady at a rate of 10 incidents out of a population of 4,034, a rate comparable with Social Circle and Watkinsville. In addition, property crime had decreased in 2016 to a six-year low. The online analytical platform Niche rates Madison's crime a "C" based on violent and property crime rates.

== Education ==
The Morgan County School District is a charter school system that covers pre-school to grade twelve, and consists of a primary school, an elementary school, a middle school, and a high school. In 2023 the district has 230 full-time teachers and over 3,200 students. The High School graduation rate is 92%, which is greater than the Georgia average of 85%. Overall rankings for the Morgan County School District versus other school districts in Georgia include:

- Highest overall rank (Top 20%)
- Highest math proficiency (Top 10%)
- Highest reading/language arts proficiency (Top 20%)

More detailed statistics for individual schools include:

- Morgan County Elementary School Students have an average math proficiency score of 50% (versus the Georgia public elementary school average of 37%), and reading proficiency score of 46% (versus the 40% statewide average).
- Morgan County Middle School Students have an average math proficiency score of 44% (versus the Georgia public middle school average of 33%), and reading proficiency score of 49% (versus the 41% statewide average).
- Morgan County High School 39% students are proficient in math (versus the Georgia public high school average of 24%), and reading proficiency matches the 32% statewide average.

== In popular culture ==
- Major parts of Stranger Things Season 5 (2025) were filmed in Madison, particularly scenes in and around the fictional 'Hawkins Memorial Hospital' for which the site of the former Morgan Memorial Hospital was used.
- Parts of the 2017 film American Made starring Tom Cruise were shot in the Morgan County Courthouse.
- Parts of the opening credits scene from the 1992 film My Cousin Vinny were filmed in Madison.
- Significant parts of the 2015 film Goosebumps, starring Jack Black, were filmed in Madison and at the Madison-Morgan Cultural Center.
- In Harry Turtledove's final Southern Victory novel Volume 11: In at the Death, Madison was the site of an important climax to the long-running series.
- I'll Fly Away (1991–93), an NBC television series starring Sam Waterston as a southern lawyer at the dawn of the civil rights movement, was shot largely in Madison.
- The historic mansion Bonar Hall served as President Franklin D. Roosevelt's hospital in HBO's 2005 film Warm Springs.
- The 2000 film Road Trip was filmed in Madison.
- The 1978 film The Great Bank Hoax starring Ned Beatty, Richard Basehart and Charlene Dallas was filmed in Madison.
- Portions of the TV series October Road were filmed in Madison.
- Portions of the TV series The Originals, were filmed in Madison. The show was a spin-off of The Vampire Diaries.
- Hissy Fit, a novel by Mary Kay Andrews, is set in Madison.
- The main character of the webcomic Check, Please!, Eric "Bitty" Bittle, is noted as being from Madison.
- Athens band R.E.M. recorded an MTV Unplugged session at the Madison Morgan Cultural Center in 1991, where they played "Losing My Religion" with the Atlanta Symphony Orchestra.

== Notable people ==
- Benny Andrews, nationally recognized as an artist, teacher, author, activist, and advocate of the arts, grew up in rural Morgan County.
- George Andrews (1911–1996) was a self-taught artist commonly referred to as the "Dot Man". He fathered ten children, including painter Benny Andrews and novelist Raymond Andrews.
- Raymond Andrews (June 6, 1934 – November 25, 1991), African-American novelist, grew up in rural Morgan County.
- Tookie Brown (born November 22, 1995), professional basketball player
- George Gordon Crawford (August 24, 1869 – March 20, 1936), industrialist, was born in Madison.
- B. J. Elder (born September 4, 1982), former Georgia Tech and professional basketball player
- Monday Floyd, carpenter and Georgia Assemblyman who was harassed, threatened, and attacked by the Ku Klux Klan until he fled to Atlanta
- Oliver "Ollie" Hardy (born Norvell Hardy) (January 18, 1892 – August 7, 1957), comic actor famous as one half of Laurel and Hardy, lived in Madison as a child where his mother owned a hotel called the Hardy House. The Madison-Morgan Cultural Center is a preserved Romanesque Revival schoolhouse housing the room where Oliver Hardy attended first grade.
- Albert T. Harris, World War II naval hero, was born in Madison.
- Allie Carroll Hart (1913–2003), director of the Georgia Department of Archives and History, 1964 to 1982
- Bill Hartman (William Coleman "Bill" Hartman Jr., March 17, 1915 – March 16, 2006), Washington Redskins running back, started playing American football in Madison.
- Joshua Hill (January 10, 1812 – March 6, 1891), U.S. senator who lived in Madison. During the Civil War, General William Tecumseh Sherman, a friend of Hill, did not burn Madison on his "March to the Sea".
- Eugenius Aristides Nisbet began his practice of law in Madison Georgia, before later being elected as one of the three initial justices of the Supreme Court of Georgia in 1845.
- Brooks Pennington Jr., businessman, philanthropist and politician, operated his father's seed store on Main Street.
- Seaborn Reese (November 28, 1846 – March 1, 1907), politician, jurist and lawyer, was born in Madison. Reese filled the seat for Georgia in the United States House of Representatives during the 47th United States Congress. He was reelected to the 48th and 49th Congresses, serving from December 4, 1882, until March 3, 1887.
- Mark Schlabach, sports journalist, New York Times best-selling author and columnist and reporter for ESPN.com, lives in Madison.
- William Tappan Thompson, humorist and writer who co-founded the Savannah Morning News newspaper in the 1850s, lived in Madison in the 1840s and worked on the city's first newspaper, The Southern Miscellany.
- Jesse Triplett, lead guitarist with Collective Soul, was born in Madison and attended the Morgan County School System.
- Philip Lee Williams (born January 30, 1950), novelist, poet, and essayist, grew up in Madison.

== See also ==
- List of municipalities in Georgia (U.S. state)
- National Register of Historic Places listings in Morgan County, Georgia
