= Carter-Newton House =

Historic house in Georgia, United States

Coordinates: 33.59165°N 83.47501°W

- U.S. Historic district – Contributing property
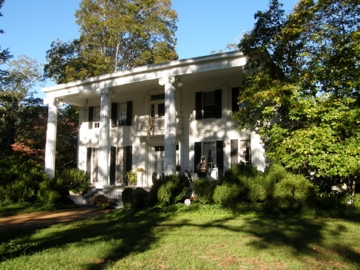

- Location within Georgia Location within the United States
- Location: 530 Academy Street; Madison, Georgia
- Built: c. 1840; 186 years ago
- Architectural style: Greek Revival
- Part of: Madison Historic District
- Designated CP: October 29, 1974

Carter-Newton House (c. 1840) at 530 Academy Street, Madison, Georgia, is one of the grand homes of Madison built during its heyday, 1840–60, leading up to the Civil War. The house was built at the peak of the cotton boom in Morgan County, on the foundation of the Madison Male Academy which operated in Madison during the first half of the 19th century.

== History ==
Not long after the academy burned down, Carter Shepherd and his wife Nancy Whitfield Shepherd, built the present wooden house, originally with eight rooms, over its foundations. The Carter Shepherds were one of the most prosperous families in Morgan County; Nancy owned 114 enslaved people, making her the fourth-largest slaver in the county at the time of the Civil War. Mary Watson Anderson of neighboring Greene County purchased the building in 1868, willing the house to Electa Carter in 1880. In 1929, the owners moved to nearby Bonar Hall, and rented the house to the Mason family, who stayed until 1941. The Newton family bought the house in 1944, and began calling the building the “Carter-Newton House”. During the years following Polly Newton's death in 2003, the house fell into disrepair. In 2018 the house was the principal location for the movie St. Agatha, a horror film set in the 1950s in small-town Georgia. The house was used again in 2019 to film the 2021 historical drama Charming the Hearts of Men. The Newton family sold the house to James Glover in 2021.
