= Senator Pennington =

Senator Pennington may refer to:

- Brooks Pennington Jr. (1925–1996), Georgia State Senate
- Dennis Pennington (1776–1854), Indiana State Senate
- John L. Pennington (1821–1900), Alabama State Senate
