= Georgian literature (disambiguation) =

Georgian literature is literature written by people from the country of Georgia.

Georgian literature may also refer to:

- Georgia literature, literature written by people from the American state of Georgia
- Literature of the Georgian era, English literature written at the beginning of the 18th century
- Georgian Poetry, a school of British poetry that established itself in the early 20th century, at the beginning of the reign of King George V
