= Plainview, Georgia =

Unincorporated community in Georgia, U.S.

Coordinates: 33°34′00″N 83°25′53″W

Plainview is an unincorporated community in Morgan County, Georgia, United States, located approximately three miles from Madison.

== History ==
Plainview has historically been a farming community. Plainview contains Plainview Baptist Church and Plainview Baptist Church Cemetery.

In 1930 and 1934 respectively, artist Benny Andrews and writer Raymond Andrews were born in Plainview.

In 1966, Sports Illustrated published an article about the introduction of football to Plainview.

In 1979, the Supreme Court of Georgia the upheld the conviction of a person convicted of the murder and armed robbery of John Garrison, who was a grocery store operator in Plainview.

== Notable people ==
- Benny Andrews (1930–2006), painter and printmaker
- Raymond Andrews (1934–1991), novelist
