= Joel Chandler Harris House =

Historic house in Georgia, United States

- Joel Chandler Harris
- U.S. National Register of Historic Places
- U.S. National Historic Landmark
- Atlanta Landmark Building
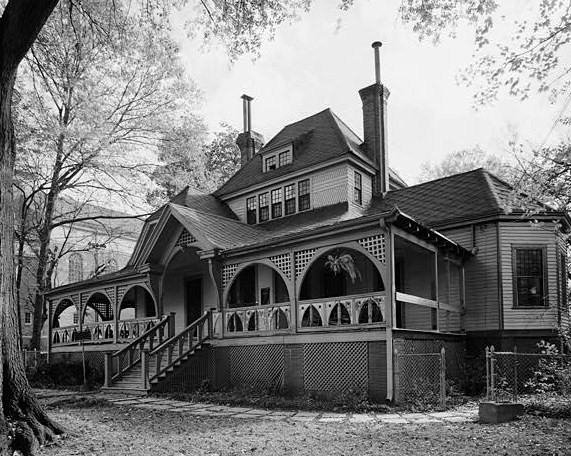
- HABS photo from 1985

- Location within Atlanta Location within Georgia Location within the United States
- Location: Ralph D. Abernathy Blvd., SW, Atlanta, Georgia
- Coordinates: 33.73764°N 84.42219°W
- Area: 3 acres (1.2 ha)
- Built: 1870
- Architectural style: Late Victorian
- NRHP reference No.: 66000281

Significant dates
- Added to NRHP: October 15, 1966
- Designated NHL: December 19, 1962
- Designated ALB: October 14, 1989

Joel Chandler Harris House, also known as The Wren's Nest or Snap Bean Farm, is a Queen Anne style house at 1050 Ralph D. Abernathy Blvd. (formerly Gordon Street.), SW. in Atlanta, Georgia. Built in 1870, it was home to Joel Chandler Harris, editor of the Atlanta Constitution and author of the Uncle Remus Tales, from 1881 until his death in 1908.

The house was designated a National Historic Landmark in 1962 for its association with Harris, and is also designated as a historic building by the City of Atlanta. It is now a historic house museum.

== Overview ==
The house was built circa 1868 in an area then known for its upper-class residents. Harris began renting the home in 1881 before buying it two years later thanks to earnings from his first book Uncle Remus: Songs and Sayings. He lived here until his death in 1908. Harris had the home extended with six additional rooms and a new Queen Anne-style facade added in 1884. A furnace, indoor plumbing, and electricity were added circa 1900.

In the late 1880s and early 1890s, Harris's goddaughter, Daisy Baker, who would become Margaret Dumont, lived at Snap Bean Farm.

Harris originally referred to the home as Snap Bean Farm, as a reference to fellow author Eugene Field's home Sabine Farm. The name "Wren's Nest" came from his discovery of a family of wrens living in the mailbox in the spring of 1895.

After several years of correspondence, Indiana poet James Whitcomb Riley visited Harris at Wren's Nest in 1900. Harris's children were especially interested in Riley and nicknamed him Uncle Jeems.

Ultimately, Harris wrote more than twenty books while living in the home as well as several editorials for the Atlanta Constitution and various articles for magazines and newspapers — including his own, The Uncle Remus Home Magazine.

== Modern history ==
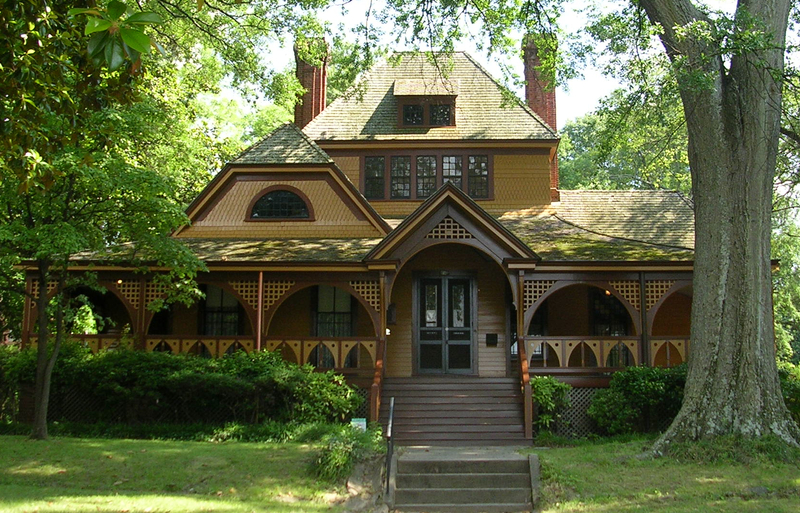
The Wren's Nest in 2009

After Harris's death, businessman Andrew Carnegie donated $5,000 toward establishing the home as a museum. He had met Harris there in 1900 during a 20-minute visit. From 1913 to 1953, the home was managed by the Uncle Remus Memorial Association, a group of volunteers who operated the house as a museum. In 1983, the organization became known as the Joel Chandler Harris Association.

The home still contains furnishings owned by Harris and utilizes the original paint colors. The house became known as Wren's Nest in 1900 after the Harris children found a wren had built a nest in the mail box; the family built a new mailbox in order to leave the nest undisturbed. The structure was designated a National Historic Landmark in 1962. The original mailbox that housed the family of wrens and led to the home's name was recreated during a renovation in 1991.

The organization that maintains the Wren's Nest offers tours and regular storytelling. The organization also has two writing programs for Atlanta area youth: KIPP Scribes, in partnership with APS charter school KIPP STRIVE Academy, and Wren's Nest Publishing Company, an entirely high school student run literary journal.

== See also ==
- List of National Historic Landmarks in Georgia (U.S. state)
- National Register of Historic Places listings in Fulton County, Georgia
