= Free Joe and the Rest of the World =

Short story

"Free Joe and the Rest of the World" is a short story by Joel Chandler Harris. It was published in The Century Magazine in 1884.

== Plot summary ==
The story is about Joe, a freed slave who finds his freedom puts him into a worse situation than when he was enslaved. Calderwood, the man who owns his wife, Lucinda, forbids the two to meet. Joe sends his dog to fetch her and has secret encounters in the woods. When word gets to Calderwood that the two have disobeyed him, he secretly sends Lucinda sixty miles away. When his dog is unable to find her, Joe fears that Lucinda is sick and seeks help from a fortune teller. Joe learns of Lucinda's departure and decides to wait for her at their meeting place. He sits at the tree near the Calderwood place until he dies.
