= Raymond Andrews =

American novelist (1934–1991)

- Born: June 6, 1934; Plainview, Georgia
- Died: November 25, 1991 (aged 57); Athens, Georgia
- Occupation: Writer
- Spouse: Adelheid "Heidi" Wenger (1966-1980)
- Relatives: George Andrews (father), Benny Andrews (brother)
- Writing career
- Period: 1966–1991
- Notable work: Appalachee Red

Raymond Andrews (June 6, 1934 – November 25, 1991) was an American novelist.

== Early life and education ==
Raymond Andrews was born June 6, 1934, in Plainview, Georgia, and grew up in north central Georgia. He was the fourth child of George Andrews and Viola Andrews, who worked as sharecroppers. In total, he had nine siblings. As a child, Andrews and his siblings assisted their parents by working in the local cotton fields and peach orchards.

At age fifteen Andrews moved to Atlanta, Georgia, where he lived at the Butler Street YMCA with his oldest brother. In Atlanta, Andrews began working as a hospital orderly and attended high school at Booker T. Washington High School. Andrews graduated from Washington High School in 1952. Following his graduation, he served four years in the United States Air Force. He spent a portion of his service stationed in Korea.

== Career ==
After he finished his tour of duty, Andrews briefly attended Michigan State University before moving to New York City where he held a variety of jobs. At various times, he worked as an airline agent for KLM Airlines, an air courier, and a proofreader. While working with KLM Airlines, Andrews traveled extensively and visited countries such as Switzerland and the Netherlands.

Andrews' first national publication was in an issue of Sports Illustrated in 1966 and was written about the first time the game of football had ever been played in the Plainview community where he grew up. On his thirty-second birthday, Andrews quit his airline job and decided to focus solely on making a career as a writer. In the early 1970s Dial Press began publishing his Muskhogean trilogy about the life of an African American in the south from the end of World War I to the beginning of the 1960s. The trilogy consists of Appalachee Red, Rosiebelle Lee Wildcat Tennessee, and Baby Sweet's.

During the 1970s and 1980s, Andrews hosted writing workshops, worked as a guest lecturer, and published several essays and reviews. He published his memoir The Last Radio Baby in 1990, and the following year he published the novel Jessie and Jesus and Cousin Claire.

== Critical reception ==
Books written by Raymond Andrews have been applauded by numerous critics and other writers. Novelist Richard Bausch described Andrew's writing as having "a smiling generosity of spirit." Appalachee Red received the James Baldwin Prize in 1979.

== Personal life ==
Andrews married Adelheid "Heidi" Wenger in 1966 in New York City. The couple divorced in 1980.

Andrews died from a self-inflicted gunshot wound in Athens, Georgia, on November 25, 1991.

== Published works ==
- Appalachee Red (Dial Press, 1978)
- Rosiebelle Lee Wildcat Tennessee (Dial Press, 1980)
- Baby Sweet's (Dial Press, 1983)
- The Last Radio Baby (Peachtree Publishers, 1990)
- Jessie and Jesus; and, Cousin Claire (Peachtree Publishers, 1991)
- Once Upon a Time in Atlanta (Chattahoochee Review, 1998)

== Awards ==
- 1979: James Baldwin Prize
- 2009: inductee, Georgia Writers Hall of Fame
- 1992: American Book Award for Jessie and Jesus; And Cousin Claire
