= George Andrews (artist) =

American self-taught artist (b. 1911, d. 1996)

George Andrews (1911–1996) was a self-taught artist commonly referred to as the "Dot Man". He fathered ten children, including painter Benny Andrews and novelist Raymond Andrews.

He was born in Plainview, Georgia, achieved a third grade education and worked as a sharecropper.

Andrews often used found objects such as rocks, shoes, purses, furniture, and occasionally canvases as surfaces for his colorful artworks. In addition to his dot pattern, he featured text, animals and figurative motifs in his paintings. He died of a heart attack in 1996. Andrews was acutely attentive to the inherent qualities of materials he used, and of how they creased, tore, or made marks.

== Exhibitions ==
1990–1992 Folk: The Art of Benny and George Andrews. Multiple sites.

1994 The Dot Man: George Andrews of Madison, Georgia. Morris Museum of Art. Augusta, Georgia.

2004 George Andrews: The Dot Man. Barbara Archer Gallery. Atlanta, Georgia.
