= Morgan County Courthouse (Georgia) =

Historic courthouse in the US

- U.S. Historic district – Contributing property
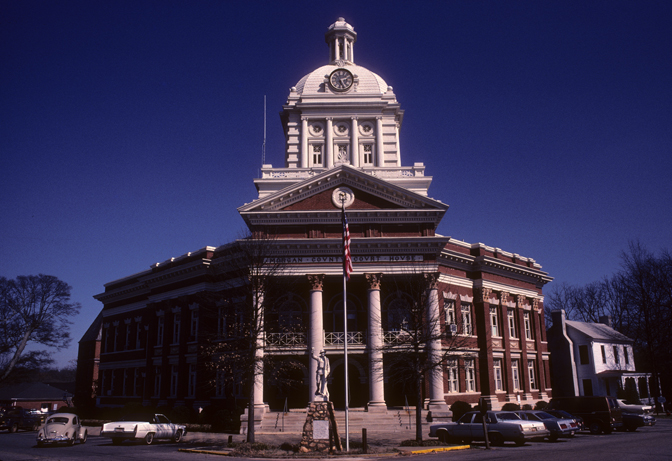
- Courthouse photo by Calvin Beale

- Location within Georgia Location within the United States
- Location: Corner of Jefferson and Hancock; Madison, Georgia
- Coordinates: 33.59574°N 83.46638°W
- Built: 1905
- Architect: J. S. Golucke and Company
- Architectural style: Beaux Arts
- Part of: Madison Historic District (ID89002159)
- Designated CP: October 29, 1974

Morgan County Courthouse in Madison, Georgia, is the third courthouse built for Morgan County. The first courthouse was built on the town square in 1809. The second courthouse was built in 1845 and was destroyed by fire in 1916. The current courthouse was constructed from 1904 to 1905. It was designed in the Beaux Arts style and features a portico entrance on the corner. It was renovated in 2005.

It was designed by J. S. Golucke and Company and built by the Winder Lumber Company. It was described as being "distinguished by a pronounced, enriched entablature, limestone lintels, sills and string courses, giant order Corinthian or Composite columns and a large, domed cupola".

== See also ==
- Madison Historic District (Madison, Georgia)
