= Allie Carroll Hart =

American historian (1913–2003)

- Born: 1913; Madison, Georgia, U.S.
- Died: 2003 (aged 89–90); Madison, Georgia, U.S.
- Education: University of Georgia, 1939 (MA, history); Brenau College, 1935 (BA, history); Columbia University (library science)

Allie Carroll Hart (1913–2003; sometimes known as Carroll Hart) was an American librarian, historian, archivist, and teacher who served as the director of the Georgia Department of Archives and History from 1964 to 1982. She was also instrumental in the founding of the Society of Georgia Archivists and the Georgia Genealogical Society, and assisted in the foundation of the Jimmy Carter Presidential Library.

== Early years and education ==
Hart was born in 1913 in Madison, Georgia. She grew up loving history and documents from a young age. Hart was an excellent student and went to Brenau College with a full scholarship, graduating with a BA in history in 1935. She then earned an MA in history at the University of Georgia in 1939.

== Career ==
In 1957, Hart was hired as assistant to the director of the Atlanta-based Georgia Department of Archives and History, working under Mary Givens Bryan. She was made director in 1964.

As director, Hart started an annual archivist training program in 1964 which continues today as the Georgia Archives Institute, attracting people from across the country and world. She also formalized the state records management process, used microfilm to preserve documents across all of Georgia's counties, and in 1966 made the Georgia Historical Society in Savannah part of the state archives.

=== Vanishing Georgia ===
Hart founded Vanishing Georgia in 1977, an organization dedicated to preserving privately held historical photographs. Using a van equipped with a darkroom traveling around Georgia, it amassed a collection of 17,000 photographs in its first five years. A book based on the project, Vanishing Georgia, was published in 1982 and led to further publications, Vanishing DeKalb and Vanishing Gwinnett.

=== Post retirement years ===
Hart retired in 1982 and moved back to her beloved hometown of Madison, where she founded the Morgan County Historical Society, the Morgan County Landmarks Society, and G.O.S.H. (Girls Over Seventy, Honey!). Even after her retirement, Georgia Secretary of State David Poythress called her "director emeritus" of the Department of Archives and History. Hart was also the historian for Madison's First United Methodist Church, and she was involved in the Daughters of the American Revolution and the Georgia Wildlife Federation.

== Death and legacy ==
Hart died in 2003 of cancer, with no immediate surviving relatives. After her death, former President Jimmy Carter said Hart would be "remembered and appreciated for generations to come for devoting her talents and professional career to preserving and chronicling Georgia's history." The Society of Georgia Archivists' Carroll Hart Scholarship is named in her honor. In 2015, Hart was recognized as a Georgia Woman of Achievement.
