= Benny Andrews =

American painter

- Born: November 13, 1930; Plainview, Georgia, U.S.
- Died: November 10, 2006 (aged 75); Brooklyn, New York, U.S.
- Education: School of the Art Institute of Chicago
- Known for: Painting and collage

Benny Andrews (November 13, 1930 – November 10, 2006) was an African-American artist, activist and educator.

Born in Plainview, Georgia, Andrews earned a BFA in painting from the School of the Art Institute of Chicago in 1958, and soon after moved to New York. He is known for his expressive, figurative paintings that often incorporated collaged fabric and other material. Andrews helped found the Black Emergency Cultural Coalition, which agitated for greater representation of African-American artists and curators in New York’s major art museums in the late 1960s and 70s. He also led the group in founding an arts education program in prisons and detention centers.

Andrews taught art at Queens College for three decades, and from 1982 to 1984, served as the director of the Visual Arts Program for the National Endowment for the Arts. He received many awards, including the John Hay Whitney Fellowship (1965–66), the New York State Council on the Arts fellowships (1971–81), and the National Endowment for the Arts Fellowship (1974–81).

== Background ==
Benny Andrews was born into a family of ten on November 13, 1930, in the small community of Plainview, Georgia. His parents, George and Viola (née Perryman), were sharecroppers. His mother and father emphasized the importance of education, religion, and freedom of expression. Andrews' father was a self-taught artist whose drawings and paintings led to renown as the "Dot Man" and a retrospective at the Morris Museum of Art.

Despite his parents' stress on education, they could not afford to let Andrews go to school when they needed his help to pick or plant cotton. He attended Plainview Elementary School, a one-and-a-half room log cabin. Education past the seventh grade was discouraged in the sharecropping community, but Andrews parents allowed him and his siblings to attend high school during the winter months. Andrews managed to graduate from Burney Street High School in Madison, Georgia, in 1948, making him his family's first high school graduate.

He received a two-year scholarship to go to Fort Valley College, a black state college in Georgia, for his work in the local 4-H organization. Unfortunately, Fort Valley College's limited art curriculum made it difficult for him to explore a range of media. He did, however, spend one summer painting murals in Atlanta during this time. Andrews' grades were poor, so when his scholarship ran out, he left college to join the U.S. Air Force. He trained in Texas before serving as a staff sergeant in Korea. While serving in the military, Andrews regularly sent his earnings home to support his mother and younger siblings. Having served from 1950 to July 1954, when he received an honorable discharge, Andrews used the G.I. Bill to attend the School of the Art Institute of Chicago, where he was trained as an abstract expressionist and received his BFA. Prior to beginning his education at the Art Institute of Chicago, Andrews had never set foot in a museum. His professor Boris Margo helped Andrews discover his own personalized art style during this time and encouraged Andrews to experiment with combining painting and collage techniques. While earning his BFA, Andrews also worked as an illustrator for record companies and created advertisements for various Chicago theater companies. He also regularly created and sold sketches of Chicago's jazz scene.

After graduating from the School of Art Institute of Chicago, Andrews moved to New York City in 1958, where he settled on the Lower East Side. He began working in the Christmas card division of the Metropolitan Museum of Art in order to generate income for his young family. His work also steadily gained critical attention and was exhibited in several cities, including New York, Philadelphia, Detroit, Provincetown, Massachusetts, where Paul Kessler gave Andrews his first solo show in 1960. In 1962 the New York Times praised his first New York City solo exhibit at the Forum Gallery. He received the John Hay Whitney Fellowship for 1965. This fellowship was renewed in 1966, and Andrews used the money to return to Georgia. While in Georgia, Andrews created his Autobiographical Series of paintings. He then received a CAPS award from the New York State Council on the Arts in 1971. In the same year, he painted one of his most notable works, No More Games, which highlighted the plight of black artists and became an icon of his emerging social justice activism in the art world.

In 1966 Andrews began teaching art classes in drawing and painting at the New School for Social Research in New York, the Jewish Community Center in Bayonne, New Jersey, and an arts initiative in the South Bronx. Then, from 1968 to 1997, he taught at Queens College, City University of New York in the SEEK program, which offered academic support for underserved students.

In 1971, Andrews began teaching at the Manhattan Detention Complex. His arts program for prisons soon became a national model. Mayor John Lindsey honors Andrews for his work in 1973, and in 1976 Andrews curated an exhibition of work made by prisoners at the Studio Museum in Harlem.

In 1976, Andrews became the art program director for the Inner City Roundtable of Youths. This organization was composed of gang members who sought to combat youth violence and strengthen New York City's urban communities.

Starting in the 1970s, Andrews regularly spent time at MacDowell. He was elected to the colony's board of directors in 1987.

== Social justice work ==
In 1969, Andrews co-founded the Black Emergency Cultural Coalition (BECC), an organization that protested the Harlem on My Mind: Cultural Capital of Black America, 1900-1968 exhibit at the Metropolitan Museum of Art. No African-Americans had been involved in organizing the show, and it contained no art—only photo reproductions and copies of newspaper articles about Harlem.

The BECC then persuaded the Whitney Museum to launch a similar exhibition of African American artists, but later felt compelled to boycott the Whitney show for similar reasons.

From 1982 to 1984, Andrews served as the director of visual arts for the National Endowment for the Arts. In this position, he had the chance to advocate for fellowships and grants to go to talented black artists who may otherwise have escaped notice.

Andrews traveled in 2006 to the Gulf Coast to work on an art project with children displaced by Hurricane Katrina.

== Art ==
Flag Day (1966) at the Art Institute of Chicago, in 2023

Benny Andrews was a figural painter in the expressionist style who painted a diverse range of themes of suffering and injustice, including the Holocaust, Native American forced migrations, and Hurricane Katrina. In the 1960s he began to find his own style of painting, which developed parallel to the flourishing collage moment. Other influences on his work include surrealism and Southern folk art. His work hangs in the Metropolitan Museum of Art in New York City; the Art Institute of Chicago; the Studio Museum in Harlem (New York City); the High Museum of Art in Atlanta, Georgia; the Hirshhorn Museum in Washington, DC; the National Gallery of Art in Washington, DC; The Phillips Collection in Washington, DC; and the Ogden Museum of Southern Art in New Orleans, Louisiana.

During the 1970s, he participated in a community art space called Communications Village operated by printmaker Benjamin Leroy Wigfall in Kingston, NY. Andrews made prints with the help of printer assistants who had been taught printmaking by Wigfall, and he exhibited there.

Reflecting his minimalist style, Andrews said he was not interested in how much he could paint, but how little. He incorporated his sparing use of geometrical forms to convey broader messages about his subjects. Gabriel Tenabe describes his drawing as "delicate, subtle, and intimate... draw(ing) from his past private life in Georgia and his social life in New York." Christian imagery is juxtaposed with sensibilities of humanism to call out false religion, false democracy, sexism, and militarism and their roles in creating a failed society.

Using various media, Andrews depicted diverse American scenes and people in a figurative style that he felt both reflected the dignity of those he portrayed and served his commitment to social change.

== Family life ==
Benny Andrews married Mary Ellen Jones Smith, a photographer, in 1957. The couple had three children, Christopher, Thomas, and Julia, before separating in 1976. The couple officially divorced in 1986.

Andrews then married artist Nene Humphrey in 1986. The couple met at MacDowell.

Andrews died of cancer on November 10, 2006, at the age of 75.

== Honors and awards ==
- John Hay Whitney Fellowship - 1965-66
- New York Council for the Arts Fellowship - 1971-1981
- MacDowell Fellowships - 1972-1973, 1975-1978
- National Endowment for the Arts Fellowship - 1974-1981
- O'Hara Museum Prize, Tokyo -1976
- Bellagio Fellowship, Rockefeller Foundation - 1990
- Member of the National Academy of Design - 1997
- President’s Award to The Benny Andrews Foundation, United Negro College Fund - 2010

== Selected Collections ==
- Minneapolis Institute of Art, Minneapolis, MN
