= Bonar Hall =

Historic house in Georgia, United States

- U.S. National Register of Historic Places
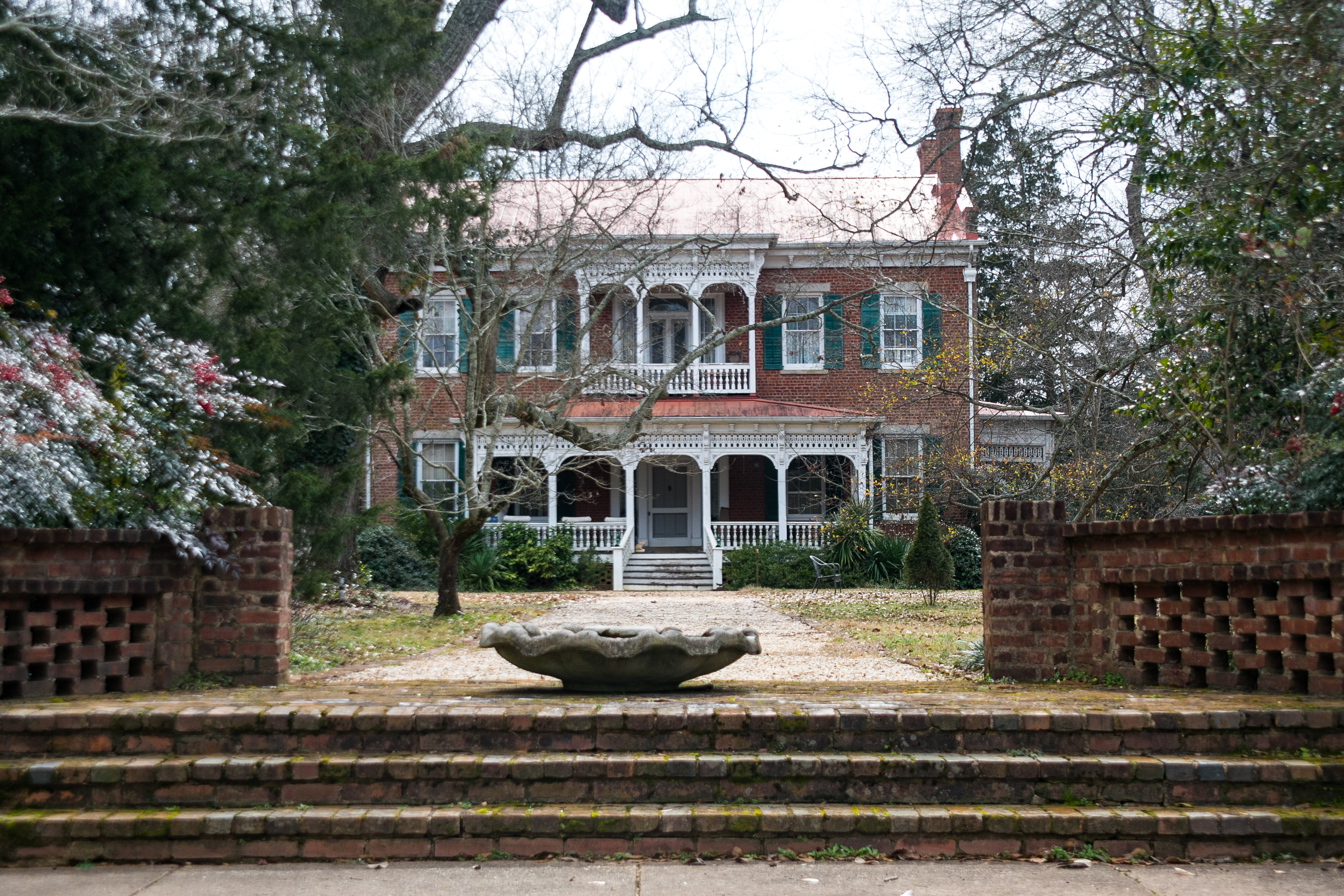

- Location within Georgia
- Location: 962 Dixie Avenue; Madison, Georgia 30650
- Coordinates: 33.5875°N 83.4817°W
- Area: 10 acres (4.0 ha)
- Built: 1839
- Architectural style: Late Georgian
- MPS: Madison Historic District
- NRHP reference No.: 72000388
- Added to NRHP: January 20, 1972

Bonar Hall is an 1839–40 Georgian-style house in Madison, Georgia, one of the first of the grand-style homes built during the town's cotton-boom heyday, 1840–60. It was placed on the National Register of Historic Places in 1972.

The two-story brick townhouse was built by John Byne Walker, an early Morgan county pioneer, and his heiress bride, Eliza Fannin, half-sister of a war hero, James W. Fannin, Jr., the famous commander at the Goliad Massacre during the Texas Revolution after whom counties in Georgia and Texas are named. Their home sat on a large tract of land that she inherited from her father, Isham Fannin, one of the founders of Madison and Morgan County, he being on the first board of county officials who were, in turn, responsible for founding the town.

The first bricks, made on John Byne's plantations, were laid on February 25, 1839, starting with the brick kitchen; all of the brickwork was finished by early July. They moved into their new home 10 months later. Designed by an unknown professional architect, the main house, known then as the John Byne Walker Townhouse, was originally a four-over-four traditional Georgian manor house with rooms 20’x 20’, eight fireplaces, 18"-thick walls, silver doorknobs and 13' ceilings. The Georgian-style house featured a small one-story portico with four white columns, with small brick "summer houses" on either side (now a tea house and an orangery) and, in back, a three-room brick kitchen flanked on either side by matching his and her brick “necessaries”. Today, the 13-acre (53,000 m^{2}) estate includes, in addition, a two-room cabin originally from downtown Madison and one of the oldest buildings in the town (c. 1810–1815), a slave cabin (c. 1830), a tenant house (c. 1900), a classic 1880s Victorian carriage house, a 1920s log smoke house, and a working well. Of particular note is the classic formal boxwood garden dating from around 1850 and described in numerous books on historic gardens of the South.

== John Byne Walker ==
A cotton-growing magnate, John Byne Walker was one of the wealthiest men in Morgan County at the time of the Civil War, owning over 200 slaves and some 4,000 acres (16 km^{2}) of land in Morgan County, Georgia and 6,000 in Wharton County, Texas, to which he traveled yearly between 1846 and 1862. One of the original backers of the Georgia Railroad, he was the city's leading benefactor of the Baptist Church, donating among other things all the brick to the construction of the Madison First Baptist Church (1858). Walker brick were also used in the construction of the train depot (1840), the Presbyterian church (1842), and the Baptist College (1849), renamed the Georgia Female College.

== The war years ==
All of the Walkers' sons joined the Panola Guards, and one was mortally wounded at the Battle of Gettysburg. Because of Mr. Walker's strong ties to Texas, throughout the war they opened up their home to wounded soldiers of the Texas Rangers. After the Battle of Chickamauga in 1863, the house became a makeshift hospital for the better part of a year, with up to 20 Rangers at a time being cared for. The chaplain and Texas war correspondent, Rev. Robert F. Bunting, who visited there a number of times, made their home the Texas Depot for mail, where all letters from Texas families were sent for forwarding to the regiment. Walker was ruined by the war and died a pauper.

In 1880, the house was purchased by the prominent Broughton family, the house being a wedding present by John Broughton for his newly married son, William A. Broughton. The Broughtons made significant changes; the major ones that remain include the elaborate Victorian veranda which replaced the front portico, the stencilled ceilings in the double parlor, and the Victorian carriage house. Mr. Broughton died in 1902 and a decade later Mrs. Broughton sold the house and left for Mobile to be with her newly married daughter and other relatives there.

== The Newton-Bacon years ==
In 1920, the house was purchased by a cotton plantation owner, Mrs. Josie Bacon, formerly the wife of Edward T. Newton who died in 1904. Her family had come down from Virginia to Greene County at the end of the 18th century, claiming the land granted to her great-great-grandfather, Douglas Watson, for his services in the American Revolutionary War. She was a relative of Eliza Fannin, Douglas Watson's great granddaughter, and had previously been living for by past 14 years at the nearby Carter-Newton House on Academy Street, where her children grew up. She brought with her from the Carter-Newton House all of the family furnishings which fill the house today, including one of the ornate floor-to-ceiling mirrors from Atlanta's historic Kimball House hotel as well as a fine 14-foot (4.3 m) table which Gen. William T. Sherman and his troops dined on while passing through Burke County where her aunt, Electa Carter, had a plantation. She named the house after one of her oldest relatives, Charles Bonar; the portrait (c. 1760) of his son, William Bonar, hangs in the sitting room along with that of her grandfather, Joseph Watson Varner. Miss Josie's husband, William T. Bacon, who grew up in nearby Lexington, Georgia, was the first editor-in-chief of the UGA student newspaper, The Red and Black, editor of The Madisonian newspaper for 50 years, and State Senator. In 1968, he was elected posthumously to the Georgia Newspaper Hall of Fame, and his portrait-like photograph hangs at the UGA's Grady College of Journalism next to Ralph McGill, his political opposite.

Miss Josie's daughter, Therese Newton, inherited the house and was one of the closest friends of the popular globe-trotting adventurer, Robert L. Ripley, visiting him frequently at his 28-room Long Island mansion until his sudden death in 1949. The two sturdy dog houses in the rear were built for the two dalmatians given by him around 1948 following a visit here. Her nephew, Alex Newton, and his wife, Betsy Wagenhauser, painstakingly restored the house and grounds over a period of almost two decades following her death in 1994, including rebuilding the front brick wall in pierced diamond design and one of the matching brick "necessaries" in the rear. The portraits of the original owners, their relatives, are hanging in the matching double parlor as is that of Mattie Walker, the Walkers' youngest daughter. In 2004, Bonar Hall became the main set for Joseph Sargent's Emmy-winning film Warm Springs, about Franklin D. Roosevelt's struggle with polio during the 1920s, with Kenneth Branagh as Roosevelt, Cynthia Nixon as Eleanor, and Kathy Bates as his therapist.
