= Joel Chandler Harris =

American writer and journalist (1848–1908)

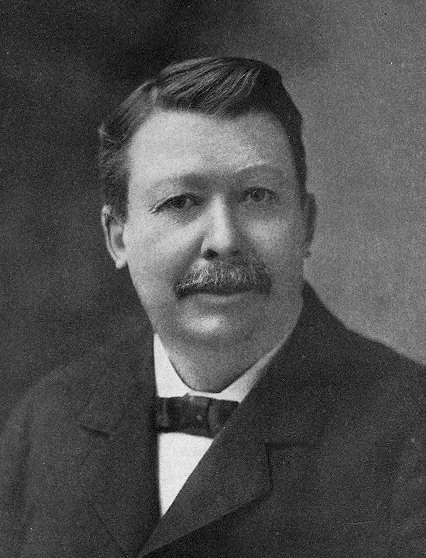
- Born: December 9, 1848; Eatonton, Georgia, U.S.
- Died: July 3, 1908 (aged 59); Atlanta, Georgia, U.S.
- Occupations: Journalist; fiction writer; folklorist
- Spouse: Mary Esther LaRose (m. 1873)
- Children: 9
- Relatives: Julia Collier Harris (daughter-in-law)
- Writing career
- Notable work: Uncle Remus stories

Joel Chandler Harris (December 9, 1848 – July 3, 1908) was an American journalist and folklorist best known for his collection of Uncle Remus stories. Born in Eatonton, Georgia, where he served as an apprentice on a plantation during his teenage years, Harris spent most of his adult life in Atlanta working as an associate editor at The Atlanta Constitution.

Harris led two professional lives: as the editor and journalist known as Joe Harris, he supported a vision of the New South with the editor Henry W. Grady (1850–1889), which stressed regional and racial reconciliation after the Reconstruction era; as Joel Chandler Harris, fiction writer and folklorist, he wrote many 'Brer Rabbit' stories from the African-American oral tradition.

== Life ==
=== Education: 1848–1862 ===
Joel Chandler Harris was born in Eatonton, Georgia, in 1848 to Mary Ann Harris, an Irish immigrant. His father, whose identity remains unknown, abandoned Mary Ann shortly after Harris' birth. The parents had never married; the boy was named Joel after his mother's attending physician, Dr. Joel Branham. Chandler was the name of his mother's uncle. Harris remained self-conscious of his illegitimate birth throughout his life.

A prominent physician, Dr. Andrew Reid, gave the Harris family a small cottage to use behind his mansion. Mary Harris worked as a seamstress and helped neighbors with their gardening to support herself and her son. She was an avid reader and instilled in her son a love of language: "My desire to write—to give expression to my thoughts—grew out of hearing my mother read The Vicar of Wakefield."

Dr. Reid also paid for Harris' school tuition for several years. In 1856, Joe Harris briefly attended Kate Davidson's School for Boys and Girls, but transferred to Eatonton School for Boys later that year. He had an undistinguished academic record and a habit of truancy. Harris excelled in reading and writing, but was mostly known for his pranks, mischief, and sense of humor. Practical jokes helped Harris cloak his shyness and insecurities about his red hair, Irish ancestry, and illegitimacy, leading to both trouble and a reputation as a leader among the older boys.

=== Turnwold Plantation: 1862–1866 ===
At the age of 14, Harris quit school to work. In March 1862, Joseph Addison Turner, owner of Turnwold Plantation nine miles east of Eatonton, hired Harris to work as a printer's devil for his newspaper The Countryman. Harris worked for clothing, room, and board. The newspaper reached subscribers throughout the Confederacy during the Civil War; it was considered one of the larger newspapers in the South, with a circulation of about 2,000. Harris learned to set type for the paper, and Turner allowed him to publish his own poems, book reviews, and humorous paragraphs.

Turner's instruction and technical expertise exerted a profound influence on Harris. During his four-year tenure at Turnwold Plantation, Joel Harris consumed the literature in Turner's library. He had access to Chaucer, Dickens, Sir Thomas Browne, Arabian Nights, Shakespeare, Milton, Swift, Thackeray, and Edgar Allan Poe. Turner, a fiercely independent Southern loyalist and eccentric intellectual, emphasized the work of southern writers, yet stressed that Harris read widely. In The Countryman Turner insisted that Harris not shy away from including humor in his journalism.

While at Turnwold Plantation, Harris spent hundreds of hours in the slave quarters during time off. He was less self-conscious there and felt his humble background as an illegitimate, red-headed son of an Irish immigrant helped foster an intimate connection with the slaves. He absorbed the stories, language, and inflections of people like Uncle George Terrell, Old Harbert, and Aunt Crissy. The African-American animal tales they shared later became the foundation and inspiration for Harris's Uncle Remus tales. George Terrell and Old Harbert in particular became models for Uncle Remus, as well as role models for Harris.

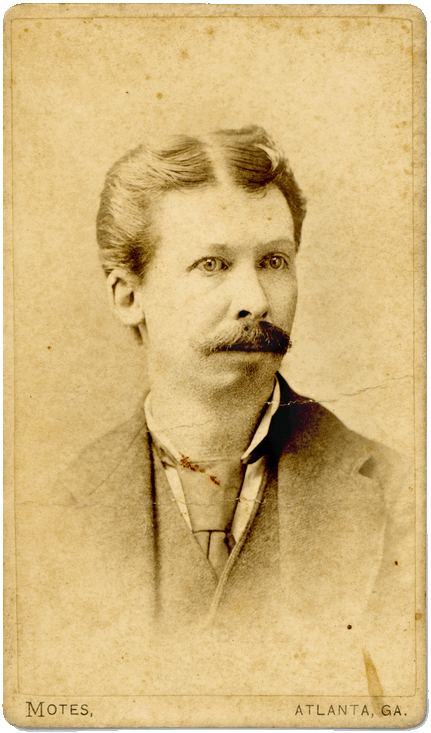
Harris in 1873

=== Savannah and the South: 1866–1876 ===
Joseph Addison Turner shut down The Countryman in May 1866. Joel Harris left the plantation with worthless Confederate money and very few possessions. He lived for a period at The Marshall House.

The Macon Telegraph hired Harris as a typesetter later that year. Harris found the work unsatisfactory and himself the butt of jokes around the office, in no small part due to his red hair. Within five months, he accepted a job working for the New Orleans Crescent Monthly, a literary journal. Just six months after that, homesick, he returned to Georgia, but with another opportunity at the Monroe Advertiser, a weekly paper published in Forsyth, Georgia.

At the Advertiser Harris found a regional audience with his column "Affairs of Georgia." Newspapers across the state reprinted his humorous paragraphs and political barbs. Harris' reputation earned him the position of associate editor at the Savannah Morning News, the largest circulation newspaper in Georgia. Though he relished his position in Forsyth, Joe Harris accepted the $40-a-week job, a significant pay increase, and quickly established himself as Georgia's leading humor columnist while at the Morning News.

In 1872 Harris met Mary Esther LaRose (Essie), a seventeen-year-old French-Canadian from Quebec. After a year of courtship, Harris and LaRose married in April 1873. LaRose was 18, and Harris 27 (though publicly admitting to 24). Over the next three years, the couple had two children. Their life in Savannah came to an abrupt halt, however, when they fled to Atlanta to avoid a yellow fever epidemic.

=== Atlanta: 1876–1908 ===
In 1876 Harris was hired by Henry W. Grady at The Atlanta Constitution, where he would remain for the next 24 years. He worked with other journalists including Frank Lebby Stanton, who was in turn an associate of James Whitcomb Riley. Harris supported the racial reconciliation envisioned by Grady. He often took the mule-drawn trolley to work, picked up his assignments, and brought them home to complete. He wrote for the Constitution until 1900.

In addition, he published local-color stories in magazines such as Scribner's, Harper's, and The Century.

==== Uncle Remus stories and later years ====
Not long after taking the newspaper appointment, Harris began writing the Uncle Remus stories as a serial to "preserve in permanent shape those curious mementoes of a period that will no doubt be sadly misrepresented by historians of the future." The tales were reprinted across the United States, and Harris was approached by publisher D. Appleton and Company to compile them for a book.

Uncle Remus: His Songs and His Sayings was published near the end of 1880. Hundreds of newspapers reviewed the best-seller, and Harris received national attention. Of the press and attention Walter Hines Page noted, "Joe Harris does not appreciate Joel Chandler Harris."

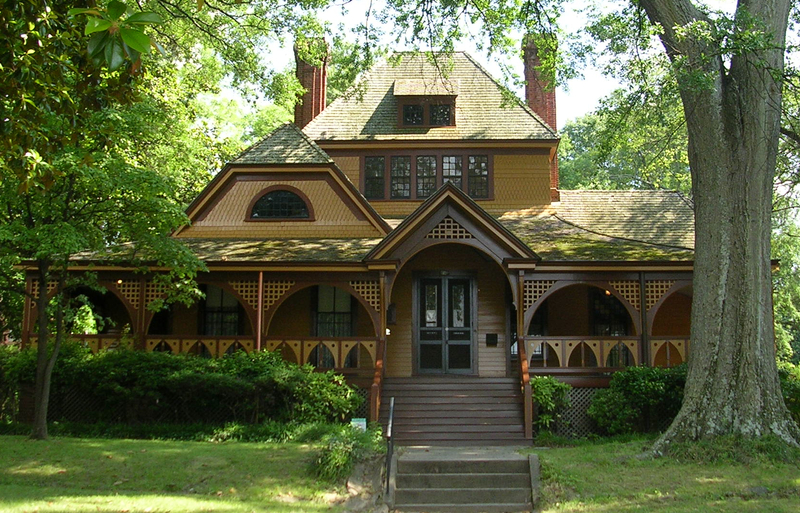
The Wren's Nest

Royalties from the book were modest, but allowed Harris to rent a six-room house in West End, an unincorporated village on the outskirts of Atlanta, to accommodate his growing family. Two years later Harris bought the house and hired the architect George Humphries to transform the farmhouse into a Queen Anne Victorian in the Eastlake style. The home, soon thereafter called The Wren's Nest, was where Harris spent most of his time.

Harris preferred to write at the Wren's Nest. He published prodigiously throughout the 1880s and 1890s, trying his hand at novels, children's literature, and a translation of French folklore. Yet he rarely strayed from home and work during this time. He chose to stay close to his family and his gardening. Harris and his wife Essie had seven more children in Atlanta, with a total of six (out of nine) surviving past childhood.

By the late 1890s, Harris was tired of the newspaper grind and suffered from health problems, likely stemming from alcoholism. At the same time, he grew more comfortable with his creative persona.

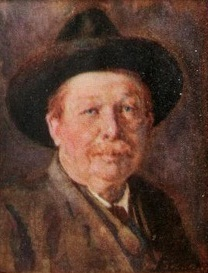
Joel Chandler Harris, c. 1905

Harris retired from the Constitution in 1900. He continued experimenting with novels and wrote articles for outlets such as The Saturday Evening Post. Still, he remained close to home, refusing to travel to accept honorary degrees from the University of Pennsylvania and Emory College (now Emory University). In 1905 Harris was elected to the American Academy of Arts and Letters.

But in the summer or fall of 1902, Harris traveled to Washington D.C. to accept an invitation to the White House by President Theodore Roosevelt. Five years later the invitation was renewed in November 1907. Roosevelt's admiration for Harris was expressed in these words from a speech: "Presidents may come and presidents may go, but Uncle Remus stays put. Georgia has done a great many things for the Union, but she has never done more than when she gave Mr. Joel Chandler Harris to American literature."

Essie Harris was a Catholic, and Harris had long been privately convinced of the truth of that Church's doctrines. On June 20, 1908, shortly before his death, he was baptized into the Catholic Faith. He died on July 3, of acute nephritis and complications from cirrhosis of the liver. In his obituary, the New York Times Book Review echoed Roosevelt's sentiment, stating: "Uncle Remus cannot die. Joel Chandler Harris has departed this life at the age of 60 ... but his best creation, [Uncle Remus] with his fund of folk-lore, will live in literature."

== Writing ==
=== Folklore ===
Harris created the first version of the Uncle Remus character for The Atlanta Constitution in 1876 after inheriting a column formerly written by Samuel W. Small, who had taken leave from the paper. In these character sketches, Remus would visit the newspaper office to discuss the social and racial issues of the day. By 1877, Small had returned to the Constitution and resumed his column.

Harris did not intend to continue the Remus character. But when Small left the paper again, Harris reprised Remus. He realized the literary value of the stories he had heard from the slaves of Turnwold Plantation. Harris set out to record the stories and insisted that they be verified by two independent sources before he would publish them. He found the research more difficult given his professional duties, urban location, race and, eventually, fame.

On July 20, 1879, Harris published "The Story of Mr. Rabbit and Mr. Fox as Told by Uncle Remus" in The Atlanta Constitution. It was the first of 34 plantation fables that would be compiled in Uncle Remus: His Songs and His Sayings (1880). The stories, mostly collected directly from the African-American oral storytelling tradition, were revolutionary in their use of dialect, animal personages, and serialized landscapes.

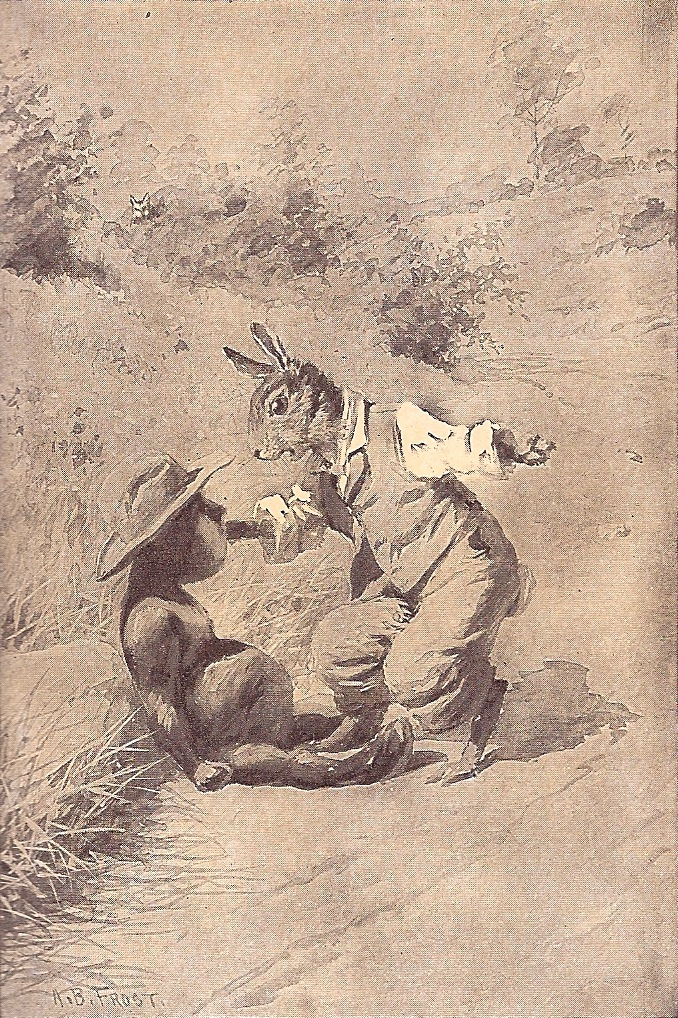
Brer Rabbit and the Tar-Baby

Remus' stories featured a trickster hero called Br'er Rabbit (Brother Rabbit), who used his wits against adversity, though his efforts did not always succeed. Br'er Rabbit is a direct interpretation of Yoruba tales of Hare, though some others posit Native American influences as well. The scholar Stella Brewer Brookes asserts, "Never has the trickster been better exemplified than in the Br'er Rabbit of Harris." Br'er Rabbit was accompanied by friends and enemies, such as Br'er Fox, Br'er Bear, Br'er Terrapin, and Br'er Wolf. The stories represented a significant break from the fairy tales of the Western tradition: instead of a singular event in a singular story, the critters on the plantation existed in an ongoing community saga, time immemorial.

The Uncle Remus stories garnered critical acclaim and achieved popular success well into the 20th century. Harris published at least twenty-nine books, of which nine books were compiled of his published Uncle Remus stories, including Uncle Remus: His Songs and His Sayings (1880), Nights with Uncle Remus (1883), Uncle Remus and His Friends (1892), The Tar Baby and Other Rhymes of Uncle Remus (1904), Told by Uncle Remus: New Stories of the Old Plantation (1905), Uncle Remus and Brer Rabbit (1907). The last three books written by Joel Chandler Harris were published after his death which included Uncle Remus and the Little Boy (1910), Uncle Remus Returns (1918), and Seven Tales of Uncle Remus (1948). The tales, 185 in sum, became immensely popular among both black and white readers in the North and South. Few people outside of the South had heard accents like those spoken in the tales, and the dialect had never been legitimately and faithfully recorded in print. To Northern and international readers, the stories were a "revelation of the unknown." Mark Twain noted in 1883, "in the matter of writing [the African-American dialect], he is the only master the country has produced."

The stories introduced international readers to the American South. Rudyard Kipling wrote in a letter to Harris that the tales "ran like wild fire through an English Public school. ... [We] found ourselves quoting whole pages of Uncle Remus that had got mixed in with the fabric of the old school life." The Uncle Remus tales have since been translated into more than forty languages.

James Weldon Johnson called the collection "the greatest body of folklore America has produced".

=== Journalism ===
Early in his career at the Atlanta Constitution, Joe Harris laid out his editorial ideology and set the tone for an agenda that aimed to help reconcile issues of race, class, and region: "An editor must have a purpose. ... What a legacy for one's conscience to know that one has been instrumental in mowing down the old prejudices that rattle in the wind like weeds."

Harris served as assistant editor and lead editorial writer at The Atlanta Constitution primarily between 1876 and 1900. He published articles intermittently until his death in 1908. While at the Constitution, Harris, "in thousands of signed and unsigned editorials over a twenty-four-year period, ... set a national tone for reconciliation between North and South after the Civil War".

Throughout his career, Harris actively promoted racial reconciliation as well as African-American education, suffrage, and equality. He regularly denounced racism among southern whites, condemned lynching, and highlighted the importance of higher education for African Americans, frequently citing the work of W.E.B. Du Bois in his editorials. In 1883, for example, the New York Sun had an editorial: "educating the negro will merely increase his capacity for evil." The Atlanta Constitution editorial countered with: if "education of the negro is not the chief solution of the problem that confronts the white people of the South then there is no other conceivable solution and there is nothing ahead but political chaos and demoralization."

Harris's editorials were often progressive in content and paternalistic in tone. He was committed to the "dissipation of sectional jealousy and misunderstanding, as well as religious and racial intolerance", yet "never entirely freed himself of the idea that the [southern whites] would have to patronize the [southern blacks]."

Harris also oversaw some of The Atlanta Constitution's most sensationalized coverage of racial issues, including the 1899 torture and lynching of Sam Hose, an African-American farm worker. Harris resigned from the paper the following year, having lost patience for publishing both "his iconoclastic views on race" and "what was expected of him" at a major southern newspaper during a particularly vitriolic period.

In 1904 Harris wrote four important articles for The Saturday Evening Post discussing the problem of race relations in the South; these highlighted his progressive yet paternalistic views. Of these, Booker T. Washington wrote to him:

It has been a long time since I have read anything from the pen of any man which has given me such encouragement as your article has. ... In a speech on Lincoln's Birthday which I am to deliver in New York, I am going to take the liberty to quote liberally from what you have said.

Two years later, Harris and his son Julian founded what would become Uncle Remus's Home Magazine. Harris wrote to Andrew Carnegie that its purpose would be to further "the obliteration of prejudice against the blacks, the demand for a square deal, and the uplifting of both races so that they can look justice in the face without blushing." Circulation reached 240,000 within one year, making it one of the largest magazines in the country.

=== Other works ===
Harris wrote novels, narrative histories, translations of French folklore, children's literature, and collections of stories depicting rural life in Georgia. The short stories "Free Joe and the Rest of the World", "Mingo", and "At Teague Poteets" are the most influential of his non-Uncle Remus creative work. Many of his short stories delved into the changing social and economic values in the South during Reconstruction. Harris's turn as a local colorist gave voice to poor white characters and demonstrated his fluency with different African-American dialects and characters.

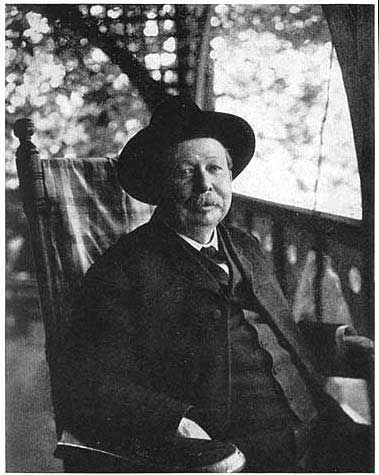
Harris at his West End home

== Legacy ==
Harris' books exerted a profound influence on storytellers at home and abroad, yet the Uncle Remus tales effectively have no critical standing. His legacy is, at the same time, not without controversy: Harris' critical reputation in the 20th and 21st Centuries has been mixed, as some accused him of appropriating African-American culture.

=== Criticism ===
Critic H. L. Mencken held a less than favorable view of Harris:

Once upon a time a Georgian printed a couple of books that attracted notice, but immediately it turned out that he was little more than an amanuensis for the local blacks—that his works were really the products, not of white Georgia, but of black Georgia. Writing afterward as a white man, he swiftly subsided into the fifth rank.

Keith Cartwright, however, asserts, "Harris might arguably be called the greatest single authorial force behind the literary development of African American folk matter and manner."

In 1981 the writer Alice Walker accused Harris of "stealing a good part of my heritage" in a searing essay called "Uncle Remus, No Friend of Mine". Toni Morrison wrote a novel called Tar Baby. Such a character appears in a folktale recorded by Harris. In interviews, Morrison said she learned the story from her family and owed no debt to him.

Scholars have questioned the authenticity of his main works, citing the difficulty that many white folklorists had in persuading African Americans to divulge their folklore. However, others note the similarity of African folk stories in several sources that are similar to the Brer Rabbit tales as published, which represent a folk genre. Examples include the Ila language Sulwe mbwakatizha Muzovu ("Hare makes the elephant afraid") in Smith & Dale The Ila-Speaking Peoples of Northern Rhodesia volume 2, page 309. In the totally unrelated Kanuri or Bornuese culture in Northern Nigeria, such tales as a Fable of Jackal and a Hyena display similar themes quite in the Brer Rabbit manner. The difficulties in obtaining printed sources on the African languages may have inhibited these aspects of critical treatment. Some critical scholars cite Uncle Remus as a problematic and contradictory figure: sometimes a mouthpiece for white paternalism, sometimes a stereotype of the black entertainer, and sometimes poetically subversive.

Julius Lester, a black folklorist and university professor, saw the Uncle Remus stories as important records of black folklore. He rewrote many of the Harris stories in an effort to elevate the subversive elements over the purportedly racist ones. Regarding the nature of the Uncle Remus character, Lester said,

There are no inaccuracies in Harris's characterization of Uncle Remus. Even the most cursory reading of the slave narratives collected by the Federal Writers' Project of the 1930s reveals that there were many slaves who fit the Uncle Remus mold.

The author Ralph Ellison was positive about Harris' work:

Aesop and Uncle Remus had taught us that comedy is a disguised form of philosophical instruction; and especially when it allows us to glimpse the animal instincts lying beneath the surface of our civilized affectations.

Some 21st-century scholars have argued that the Uncle Remus tales satirized the very "plantation school" that some readers believed his work supported. Critic Robert Cochran noted: "Harris went to the world as the trickster Brer Rabbit, and in the trickster Uncle Remus he projected both his sharpest critique of things as they were and the deepest image of his heart's desire." Harris omitted the Southern plantation house, disparaged the white Southern gentleman, and presented miscegenation in positive terms. He violated social codes and presented an ethos that would have otherwise shocked his reading audience. These recent acknowledgements echo early observations from Walter Hines Page, who wrote in 1884 that Harris "hardly conceals his scorn for the old aristocracy" and makes "a sly thrust at the pompous life of the Old South."

More recently, the scholars Henry Louis Gates Jr. and Maria Tatar debated whether to include Uncle Remus stories in their 2017 volume, The Annotated African American Folktales. Ultimately they decided on inclusion, along with a detailed preface on the critical issues surrounding Harris, race, and cultural appropriation.

=== Influence ===
Children's literature analyst John Goldthwaite argues that the Uncle Remus tales are "irrefutably the central event in the making of modern children's story." Harris's influence on British children's writers such as Kipling, Milne, Potter, Burgess and Blyton is substantial. His influence on modernism is less overt, but also evident in the works of Pound, Eliot, Joyce, and Faulkner.

Beatrix Potter illustrated eight scenes from the Uncle Remus stories between 1893 and 1896, coinciding with her first drawings of Peter Rabbit. Potter's family had favored the Uncle Remus stories during her youth, and she was particularly impressed by the way Harris turned "the ordinary into the extraordinary." Potter borrowed some of the language from the Uncle Remus stories, adopting the words: "cottontail", "puddle-duck", and "lippity-(c)lippity" into her own work.

Mark Twain incorporated several of the Uncle Remus stories into readings during his book tour. He wrote to William Dean Howells in the early 1880s, reporting that the "Tar Baby" had been received "best of all" at a reading in Hartford. Twain admired Harris' use of dialect. He appropriated exchanges and turns of phrase in many of his works, most notably in Adventures of Huckleberry Finn and The Mysterious Stranger.

A. A. Milne borrowed diction, plot, and narrative structure from several Brer Rabbit stories. "Pooh Goes Visiting" and "Heyo, House!" are particularly similar. As a boy, Milne recalled listening to his father read one Uncle Remus story per night, and referred to it as "the sacred book."

Charles Chesnutt's most famous work, The Conjure Woman, is strongly influenced by the Uncle Remus tales; he features Uncle Julius as the main character and storyteller. Chesnutt read the Uncle Remus stories to his own children.

Many scholars cite Harris' influence on William Faulkner, most importantly in terms of dialect usage, depictions of African Americans, lower-class whites, and fictionalized landscape.

Poets Ezra Pound and T. S. Eliot corresponded in Uncle Remus-inspired dialect, referring to themselves as "Brer Rabbit" and "Old Possum", respectively. Eventually the dialect and the personae became a sign of their collaboration against the London literary establishment. Eliot titled one of his books Old Possum's Book of Practical Cats.

Ralph Bakshi wrote and directed a 1975 American live action/animated crime film titled Coonskin based on Harris' Brothers rabbit, fox, and bear who rise to the top of the organized crime racket in Harlem, encountering corrupt law enforcement, con artists, and the Mafia.

=== Song of the South ===
In 1946, The Walt Disney Company produced a film based on the Uncle Remus tales called Song of the South. While commercially successful during its original release and re-releases, the film has never been released for home consumption in the United States as, since its release, the film was criticized for the way it portrays its characters and the Southern U. S. in regard to slavery, even though the film's events take place in the postbellum South, when slavery had ended. Song of the South has been released on video in a number of overseas markets, and on LaserDisc in Japan.

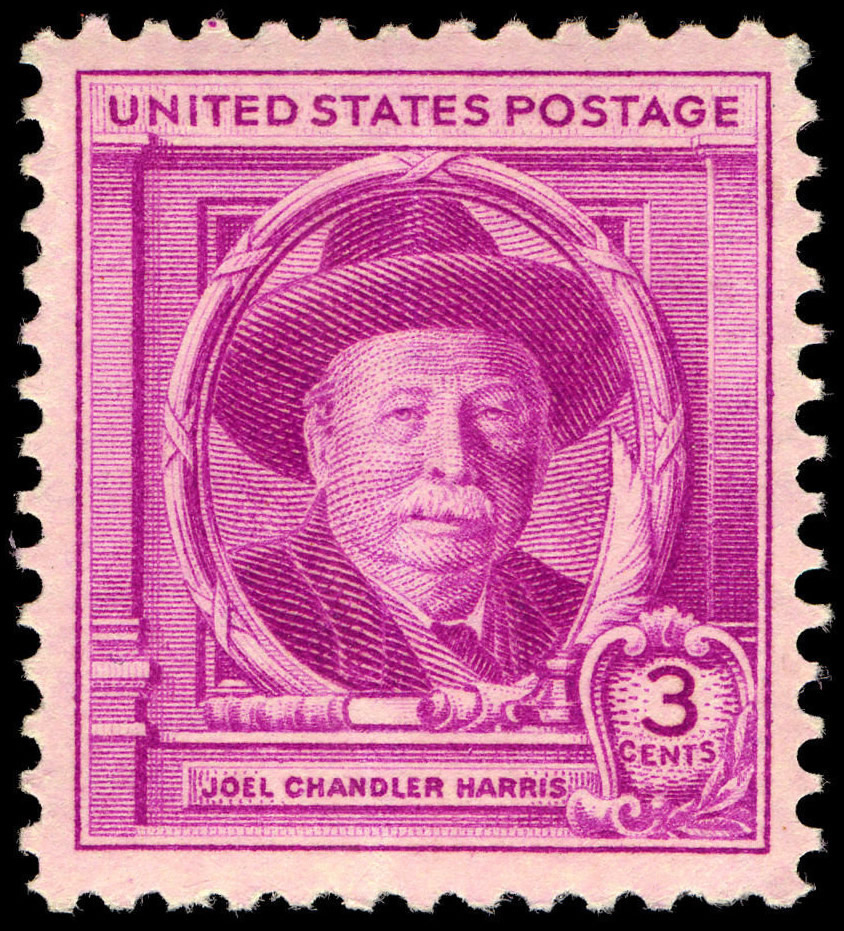
Joel Chandler Harris commemorative stamp, issued in 1948

The film earned mixed critical reviews and two Academy Awards. James Baskett won an honorary Academy Award for his portrayal of Uncle Remus, and "Zip-A-Dee-Doo-Dah" was presented with the award for Best Original Song. Walter White of the NAACP acknowledged "the remarkable artistic merit" of the film in his telegraphed press release on November 27, 1946, but decried the "impression it gives of an idyllic master-slave relationship."

Since its debut, the public perception of Harris and the Uncle Remus stories has largely been tied to the reception of Song of the South.

=== Legacy and honors ===
- The Wren's Nest, Harris's home in the historic West End neighborhood of Atlanta, Georgia, has been designated a National Historic Landmark. It has been operated as a museum home since 1913.
- Uncle Remus Museum in Eatonton, Georgia, commemorates the life of Harris.
- Joel C. Harris Middle School in San Antonio, Texas, is named after Harris.
- A state historic landmark plaque was erected in Savannah, Georgia, on Bay Street across from the now demolished Savannah Morning News building where Harris worked in that city.
- The U.S. Post Office issued a 3-cent stamp commemorating Joel Chandler Harris on the 1948 100th anniversary of his birth.
- A state historic landmark plaque was erected in Forsyth, GA on Main Street at N 33° 2.057', W 83° 56.354'. The plaque reads: One block east stood the old office of The Monroe Advertiser, where Joel Chandler Harris, creator of "Uncle Remus", came in 1867, as a boy of nineteen, to work until 1870. Here he advanced from printer's devil to accomplished journalist. Of his duties, Harris said: "I set all the type, pulled the press, kept the books, swept the floor and wrapped the papers for mailing." His typestand is still in use at the present office of The Monroe Advertiser.

== Selected list of works ==
- The Romance of Rockville (1878)
- Uncle Remus: His Songs and His Sayings (1880)
- Nights with Uncle Remus (1883)
- Mingo and Other Sketches in Black and White (1884)
- Free Joe and Other Georgian Sketches (1887)
- Daddy Jake, The Runaway: And Short Stories Told After Dark (1889)
- Joel Chandler Harris' Life of Henry W. Grady (1890)
- Balaam and His Master and Other Sketches and Stories (1891)
- On the Plantation: A Story of a Georgia Boy's Adventures During the War (1892)
- Uncle Remus and His Friends (1892)
- Evening Tales (1893), translation into English from the French of a selection of tales from Frédéric Ortoli's Les contes de la veillée (1887) book.
- Little Mr. Thimblefinger and his Queer Country: What the Children Saw and Heard There (1894), illustrated by Oliver Herford, OCLC 1147163
- Mr. Rabbit at Home (1895), illus. Herford – sequel to Mr. Thimblefinger, LCCN 04-16287
- Stories of Georgia (1896)
- Georgia. From the Invasion of De Soto to Recent Times (1896)
- Sister Jane: Her Friends and Acquaintances (1896)
- The Story of Aaron (so named): The Son of Ben Ali (1896), illus. Herford, LCCN 04-23573
- Aaron in the Wildwoods (1897), illus. Herford – sequel, LCCN 04-23574
- Tales of the Home Folks in Peace and War (1898)
- Plantation Pageants (1899)
- The Chronicles of Aunt Minervy Ann (1899)
- On the Wing of Occasions (1900)
- Gabriel Tolliver (1902)
- The Making of a Statesman and Other Stories (1902)
- Wally Wanderoon and His Story-Telling Machine (1903)
- A Little Union Scout (1904)
- The Tar-Baby and Other Rhymes of Uncle Remus (1904)
- Told By Uncle Remus: New Stories of the Old Plantation (1905)
- Uncle Remus and Brer Rabbit (1907)
- The Bishop and the Boogerman (1909)
- Shadow Between His Shoulder Blades (1909)
- Uncle Remus and the Little Boy (1910)
- Uncle Remus Returns (1918)
- Seven Tales of Uncle Remus (1948)
- The Yankee Hater (stage play, date unknown)

== See also ==
- Literature of Georgia (U.S. state)

== Bibliography ==
- Bickley, Bruce (1987). Joel Chandler Harris: a Biography and Critical Study. University of Georgia Press. ISBN 0-8203-3185-6.
- Brasch, Walter (2000). The Cornfield Journalist. Mercer University Press. ISBN 0-86554-696-7.
- Cartwright, Keith (2001). Reading Africa into American Literature: Epics, Fables, and Gothic Tales. University of Kentucky Press. ISBN 0-8131-9089-4.
- Goldthwaite, John (1996). The Natural History of Make-Believe: A Guide to the Principal Works of Britain, Europe, and America. Oxford University Press. ISBN 0-19-503806-1.
