= Madison Historic District (Madison, Georgia) =

Historic district in Georgia, United States

- U.S. National Register of Historic Places
- U.S. Historic district
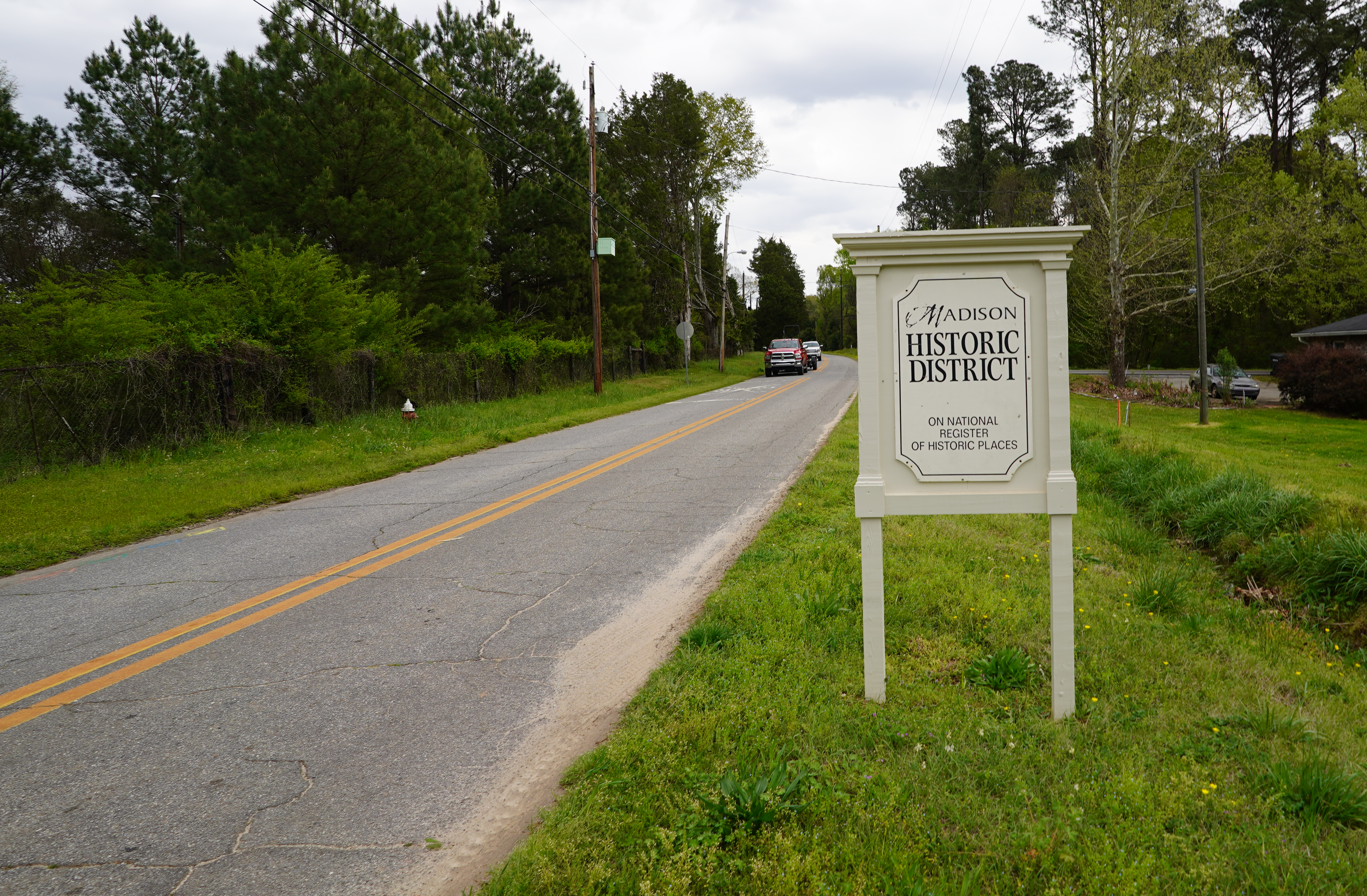
- Madison County Historic District

- Location within Georgia Location within the United States
- Location: Roughly bounded on both sides by U.S. 441 (original); Roughly Main St., Old Post Rd., Academy St., Dixie St., and Washington St. (increase); Madison, Georgia
- Coordinates: 33°35′37″N 83°28′16″W
- Built: 1820 (original); 1807 (increase)
- Architect: Multiple
- Architectural style: Greek Revival, Late Victorian (original); Late 19th And Early 20th Century American Movements, Greek Revival, Late Victorian (increase)
- NRHP reference No.: 74000696 (original); 89002159 (increase)

Significant dates
- Added to NRHP: October 29, 1974 (original)
- Boundary increase: January 08, 1990 (increase)

Madison Historic District in Madison, Georgia is a historic district that was listed in the National Register of Historic Places in 1974. Its boundaries were increased in 1990 and it then encompassed 356 contributing buildings, three other contributing structures, four contributing objects, and three contributing sites.

It includes:

- The elaborate Beaux Arts style 1905 Morgan County Courthouse. Made with brick and limestone it was designed by J. S. Golucke and Company and built by the Winder Lumber Company. It was described as being "distinguished by a pronounced, enriched entablature, limestone lintels, sills and string courses, giant order Corinthian or Composite columns and a large, domed cupola".
- Bonar Hall, a brick Georgian home built in 1839 by cotton-magnate John Byne Walker and Eliza Fannin, one of the first "grand homes" in Madison, flanked on either side by brick summer houses and in the back by the original brick kitchen and two matching "necessaires". The house has a Victorian front porch and side porch both added in the early 1880s by the second owners, the William Broughton's, and was carefully restored by the present owners, Newton's, cousins of Eliza Fannin. separately NRHP-listed
- Carter-Newton House, a Greek Revival "grand home", built circa 1849 by Carter Sheppard, a major cotton grower with 2,440 acres in the county and a saw mill. It was purchased in 1868 by Electa Carter and was modified somewhat in 1906 by her cousins, the Edward Newton's, who joined the Carter's there, the house remaining with that family ever since. Greek Revival style
- Boxwood, built in 1851-2 by Wilds Kolb, Madison's richest man before the war. It is a town house based on "a Suburban Cottage in the Italian Style" from Andrew Jackson Downing's pattern book called The Architecture of Country Houses. It has, unusually, three stories and two facades, one facing Old Post Road, which has a classical one-story Doric portico and another facing Academy Street which is Italianate in style with a veranda. The original formal English boxwood gardens grace both entrances. It is now owned by the Floyd Newton's, whose family has owned it since 1906.
- Heritage Hall, another Greek Revival home, built in 1811 and purchased in 1830 by Dr. Elijah Evans Jones, a prominent physician in Madison who extensively modified and expanded it, adding the front porch and columns. Dr. Jones was also the Chairman of the Board of Trustees of the Georgia Female College in Madison and a major shareholder in the Georgia Railroad. Formerly known as the Jones-Turnell-Manley House, it was constructed 200 feet from its current location and moved in 1909 when the owner at the time, Mr. Stephen Turnell, sold a portion of the home's acreage for the construction of a new Methodist church. The entire home was lifted, placed on logs, and pulled by horses and mules to its current site. In 1923, Mr. Turnell transformed the home into Traveler's Inn. Heritage Hall was a private residence until 1977 when it was donated to the Morgan County Historical, Inc., and it has been operated ever since as a house museum, open daily.
- Joshua Hill House, a Greek Revival home built around 1840 by Joshua Hill, noted Georgian of the Civil War and Reconstruction eras. He was born in 1812 and drawn into the American or Know-Nothing party when the Whig party in Ga. collapsed and was elected to Congress in 1856, defeating Linton Stephens. An outspoken opponent of secession, Hill resigned his seat in 1861 rather than withdraw with the other members of the Ga. delegation. In 1863 he made an unsuccessful bid for the governorship. After the war, Hill participated actively in the work of Reconstruction as a member of the constitutional convention of 1865 and as a U.S. As a friend of General William Sherman while in Congress, he may be responsible for having saved Madison from destruction by pleading with Gen. Sherman, before his famous "March to the Sea", not to burn his town.
- First Baptist Church, designed by William C. Wilson, built in 1858 with brick donated by John Byne Walker
- St. Paul AME Church, with E. P. Neal as builder
- Madison Graded School, a fine old two-story Romanesque Revival red brick building designed by Tinsley and Wilson and built in 1895, the first graded schoolhouse in the southeast. Last used as a school in 1957, it has operated since 1976 as the Madison-Morgan Cultural Center and has the original auditorium and school bell which still rings for the many visitors who enjoy the full schedule of exhibitions, performances and other programs throughout the year.

== Gallery ==
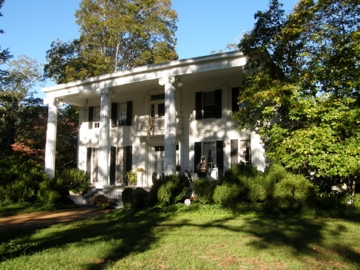
Carter-Newton House

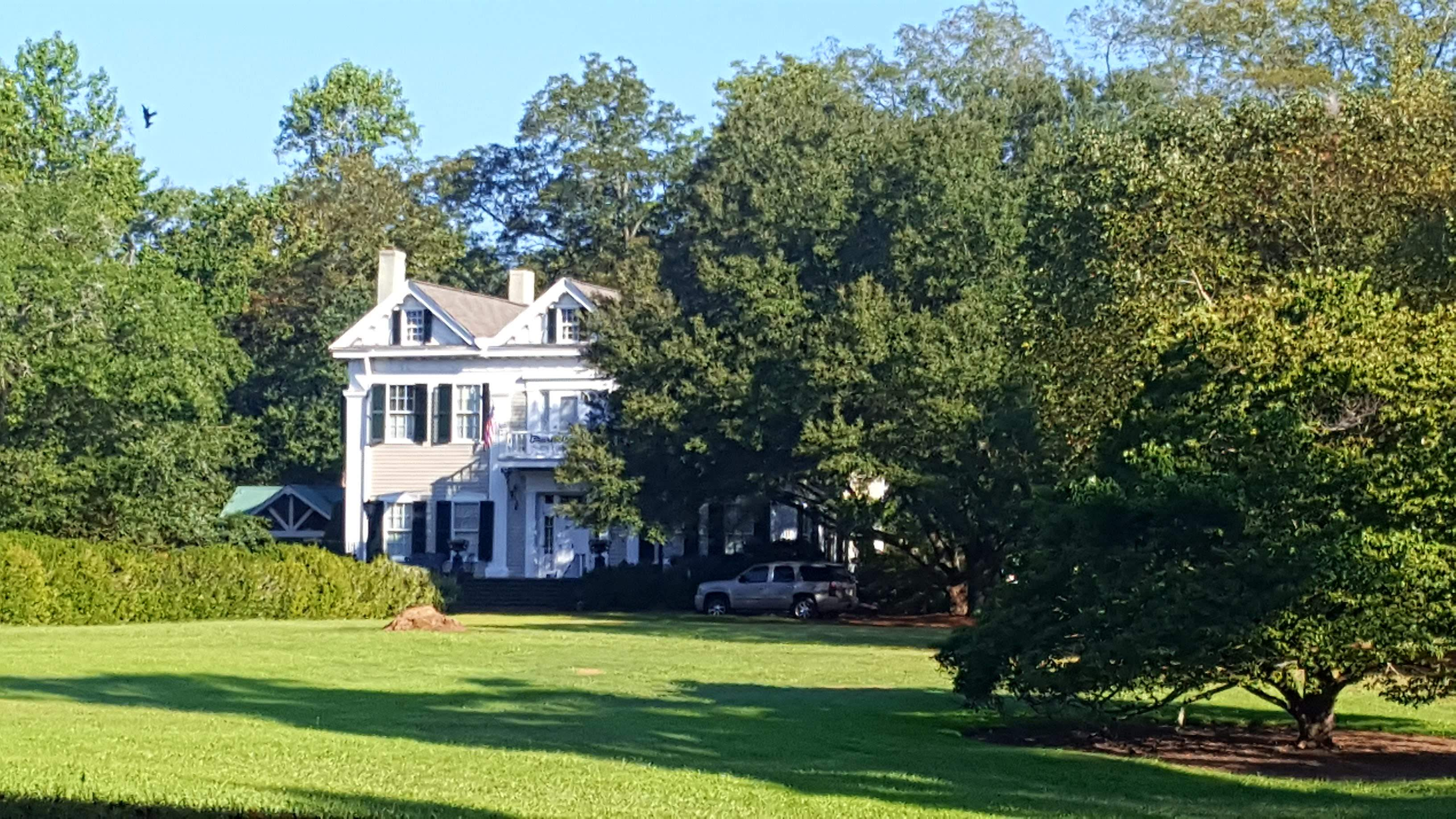
Thurleston - 2018

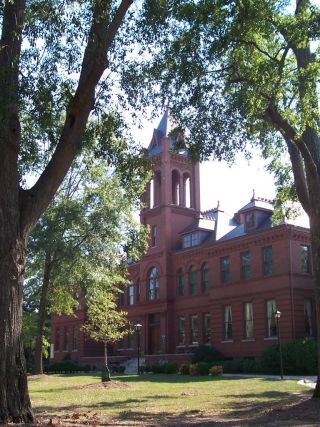
Madison Morgan Cultural Center - 2012

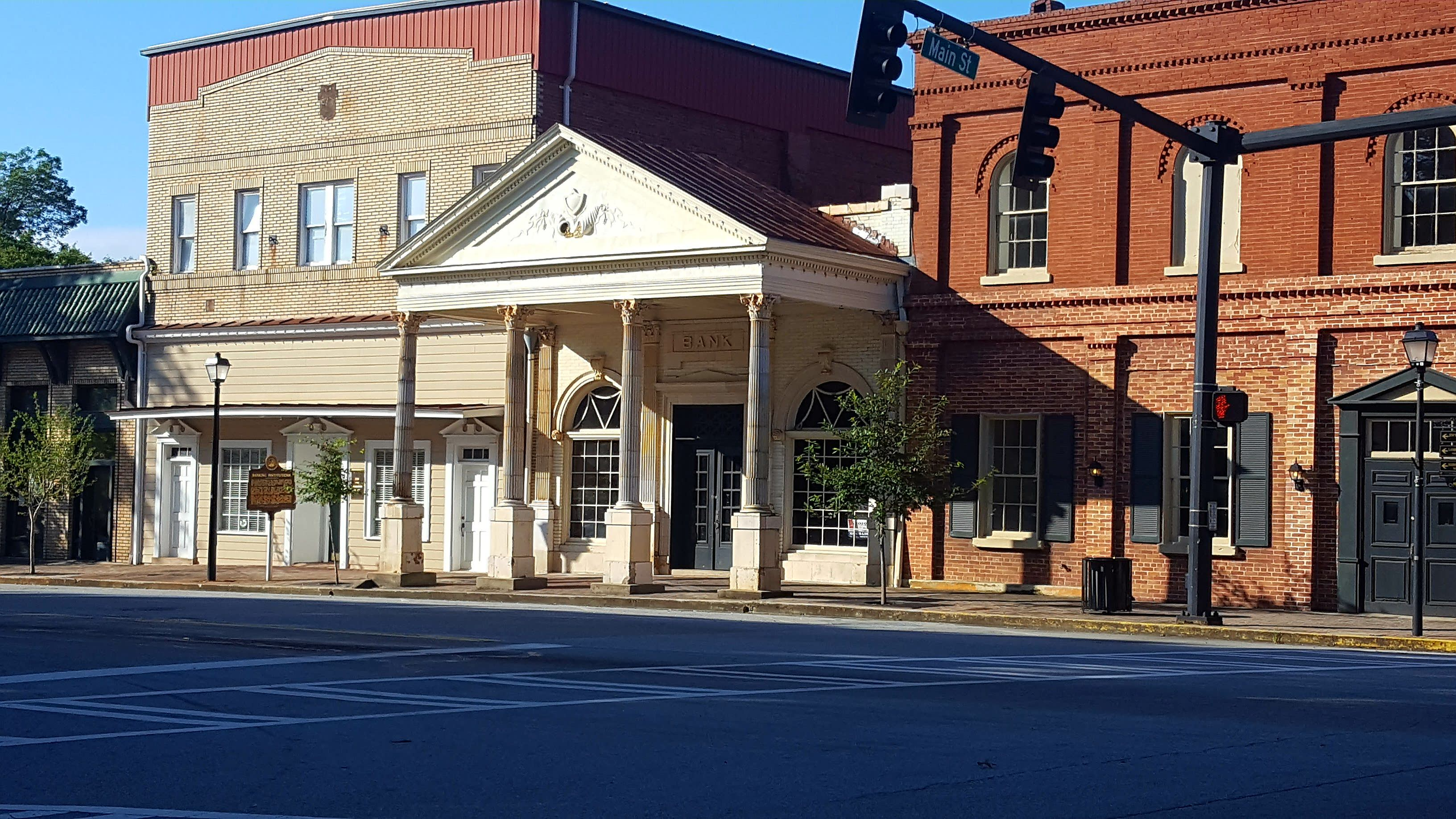
N. Main Street Buildings - 2018
