= Georgia literature =

The literature of Georgia, United States, includes fiction, poetry, and nonfiction. Representative writers include Erskine Caldwell, Carson McCullers, Margaret Mitchell, Flannery O’Connor, Charles Henry Smith, and Alice Walker.

== History ==
A printing press began operating in Savannah in 1762.

Writers of the antebellum period included Thomas Holley Chivers (1809-1858), Richard Henry Wilde (1789-1847). In 1838 in Augusta, William Tappan Thompson founded the "first literary journal in Georgia," the Mirror.

Joel Chandler Harris (1848-1908) wrote the bestselling Uncle Remus stories, first published in 1880, a "retelling [of] African American folktales."

Jean Toomer (1894-1967) wrote the novel Cane after "a three-month sojourn in Sparta."

== Organizations ==
The Georgia Writers Association formed in 1994.

== See also ==
- Category:Writers from Georgia (U.S. state)
- List of newspapers in Georgia (U.S. state)
- Category:Georgia (U.S. state) in fiction
- Category:Libraries in Georgia (U.S. state)
- Southern United States literature
- American literary regionalism

== Bibliography ==
- Lucian Lamar Knight, ed. (1913). "Fifty Reading Courses: Georgia". Library of Southern Literature. Vol. 16. Atlanta: Martin and Hoyt Company. p. 186+. hdl:2027/uc1.31175034925258 – via HathiTrust.
- Elsie Dershem (1921). "Georgia". Outline of American State Literature. Lawrence, Kansas: World Company – via Internet Archive.
- Federal Writers' Project (1940), "Literature", Georgia: a Guide to Its Towns and Countryside, American Guide Series, Athens: University of Georgia Press, pp. 117–125, ISBN 9781603540100 – via Google Books
- Bertram Holland Flanders (2010) [1944]. Early Georgia Magazines: Literary Periodicals To 1865. University of Georgia Press. ISBN 978-0-8203-3536-0.
- G. Thomas Tanselle (1971). Guide to the Study of United States Imprints. Harvard University Press. ISBN 978-0-674-36761-6. (Includes information about Georgia literature)
- Hugh Ruppersburg, ed., Georgia Voices: Fiction (Athens: University of Georgia Press, 1992).
- Hugh Ruppersburg, ed., Georgia Voices: Nonfiction (Athens: University of Georgia Press, 1994).
- Michael E. Price, Stories with a Moral: Literature and Society in Nineteenth-Century Georgia (Athens: University of Georgia Press, 2000).
- Hugh Ruppersburg, ed., Georgia Voices: Poetry (Athens: University of Georgia Press, 2000).
- Rayburn S. Moore (2001). "Literature of Georgia". In Joseph M. Flora; Lucinda Hardwick MacKethan (eds.). Companion to Southern Literature: Themes, Genres, Places, People, Movements, and Motifs. Louisiana State University Press. pp. 294–302. ISBN 978-0-8071-2692-9.
- Hugh Ruppersburg, ed., After O'Connor: Stories from Contemporary Georgia (Athens: University of Georgia Press, 2003).
