= Nene Humphrey =

American sculptor and installation artist

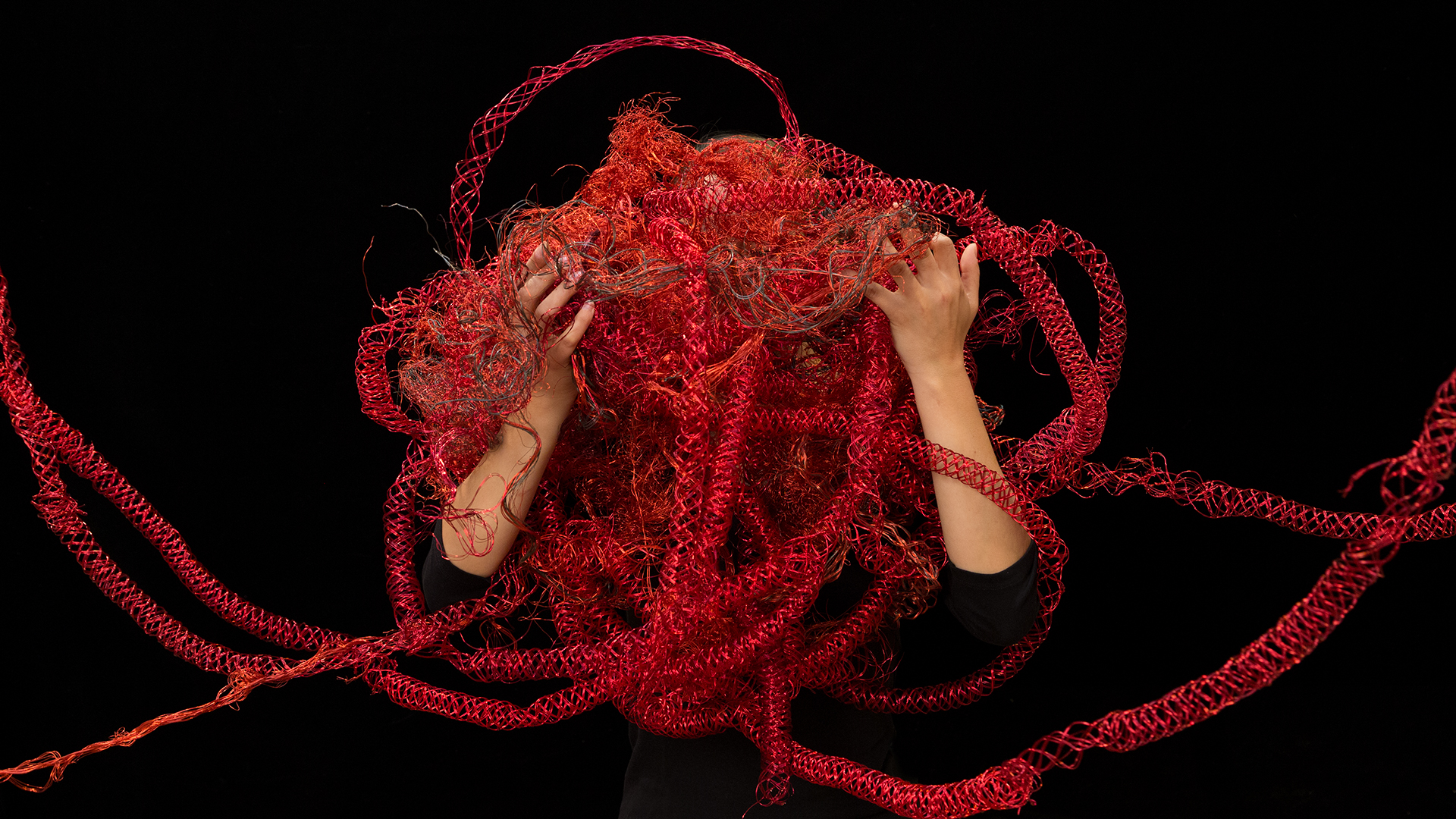
- Circling the Center, 2018
- Born: March 18, 1947; Portage, Wisconsin, United States
- Known for: Sculpture; Installation art Multidisciplinary Art
- Movement: Contemporary art Feminist art
- Awards: Anonymous Was A Woman Award

Nene Humphrey (born March 18, 1947) is a New York-based multidisciplinary artist. Her work has been compared to that of Kiki Smith, Janine Antoni, Petah Coyne, and Louise Bourgeois. She has lived and worked in New York since 1978. Humphrey's work explores the body, loss, the neuroscience of emotion, and the beauty inherent in both. The integration of art and science is fundamental to Humphrey's art practice, which often takes the form of iterative research-based projects.

== 1980s ==
In the 1980s, Humphrey became known for sculptures made with wax, plaster, wood, and wire armatures that referenced the body without re-making it. After a back injury in 1980 left her incapacitated, Humphrey began making drawings and a series of sculptural structures with spine-like columns. These works explore the tensions between interior and exterior, physical and psychological.

Their immediacy and tactility often results in skin-like textures made through intensely repetitive processes that show the artist's hand. Humphrey's sculptures reference minimalism’s formal severity while also examining it critically, drawing comparisons to post-minimal sculptors like Eva Hesse.

The works in her Breathing Wall for Vesalius (1985–86) series portray an abstract and tactile take on feminist portrayals of the body. These wall-based sculptures contrast stiff wires and softer vessel-like structures, exposing the “...dichotomy between the opposite components of her own body: the stiff and hard support structure of her back (spine) one the one hand, and the relatively soft and flexible muscles [on the other].” These abstract sculptures alluded to and were directly informed by bodily processes and the human form. Close observation of these works reveal textures by turns soft and ragged, an effect of eroding the surface and “literally scarring or wounding the form.”

This period established the artist's early interest in the neuro-biological and emotional processes of memory that would inform her later works.

== 1990s ==
In the 1990s Humphrey's feminist and tactile inclinations developed into an interest in domestic handcraft. Specifically, the connection between imprints left by the body and its reciprocal marks in acts such as sewing, scouring, sweeping and braiding. As Nancy Princenthal noted in a 1996 catalog essay, “…everything in Humphrey’s work is centered around tactility, beginning in handwork and resulting in a poeticized breed of manual objects.”

=== Spoons (1994-1998) ===
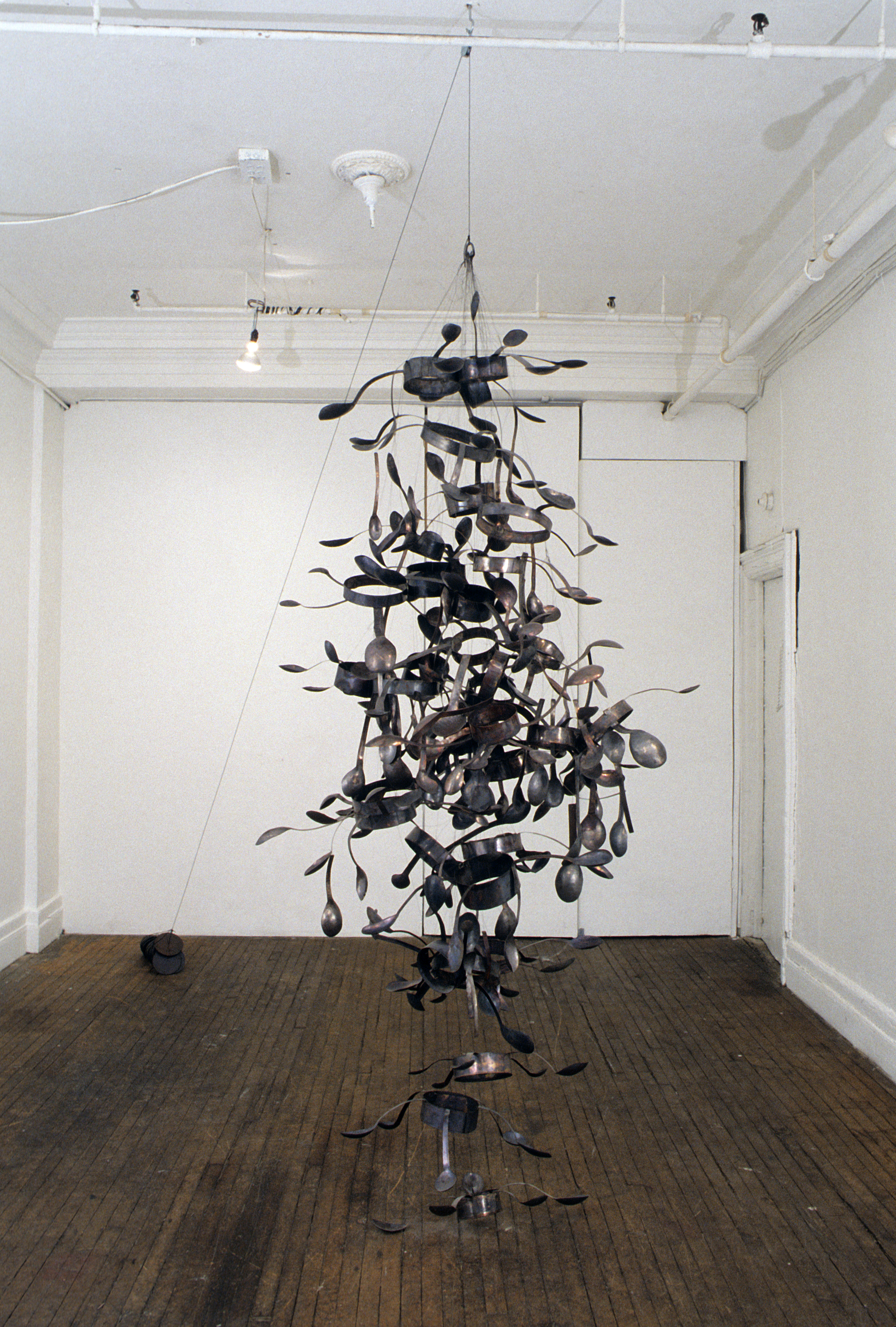
Receiving, 1995

Beginning in 1994, Humphrey made a series of works in collaboration with her mother, a homemaker from whose “unheroic” house-bound labor Humphrey previously “had felt disconnected.” Accepting an offer of help in her studio during one of her mother's visits, Humphrey was made aware of the relationship between her practice and her training under her mother during childhood.

They include spoons made by hand from cut and hammered copper that are strung up in elaborate hanging sculptures resembling mobiles or chains. Collaborating with the artist's mother to make Mother’s Spoons, Humphrey would shape spoons in celluclay then pass them along to her mother to alter with wire. The resulting lines mimic the movements of hands doing domestic tasks like stirring, folding, or nursing.

For Humphrey the form of the spoon symbolizes an extension of the hand through a simple tool. Representing the act of feeding these spoons reference sustenance, care, and survival.

=== A Wild Patience (1996-1997) ===
Continuing to work with her mother and family Humphrey's A Wild Patience series included works made from an amalgamation of hands cast in celluclay. In Genealogy, the artist made casts of the hands of her immediate family: her mother, father, sister, brother and herself. These objects are not perfect replicas of the body but rather ambiguous representations. After being cast, they are then sanded and burned, resulting in an almost fossilized state.

The hands in A Wild Patience are made the same way but are “composed of five activations on Humphrey’s mother’s hands, each of which refers to a specific domestic activity.” The title of the work is taken from Adrienne Rich’s poem “Integrity,” and references the tenacity and humility that caregiving and homemaking require.

=== Common Touch (1999) ===
In 1999 Humphrey was commissioned by the Katonah Museum of Art to create a site-specific work that continued her interest in hands as a representation of labor. In the museum's garden, the artist created five copper boxes resembling garden beds. She then filled them with abstracted terracotta hands molded from museum staff, supporters, and volunteers.

== 2000s-2010s ==
=== Loculus (1999-2001) ===
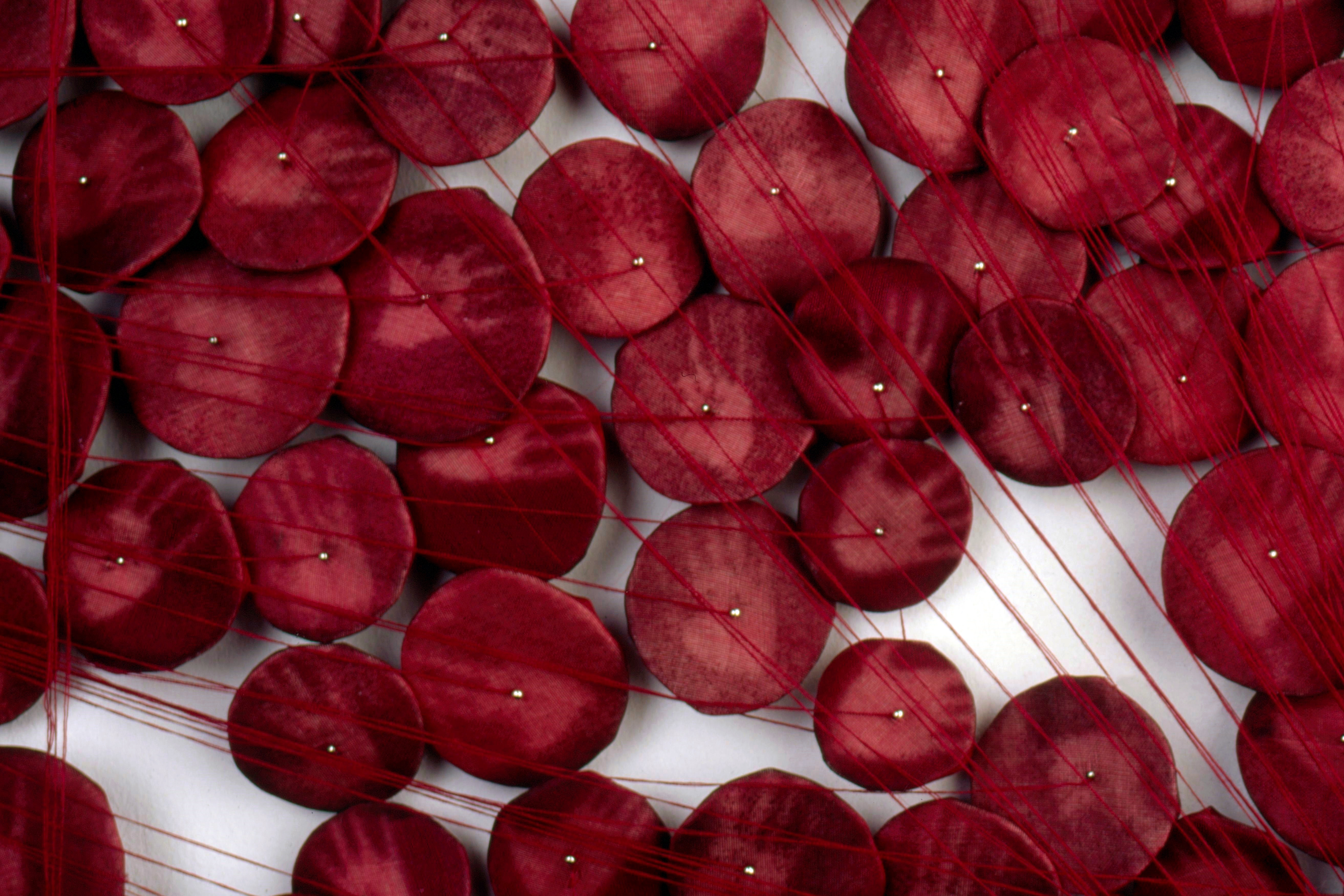
Loculus, Detail, 2000

Humphrey's Loculus series continued the artist's interest in the body and scientific research through meditative repetition. The Loculus works involve masses of hand-stitched red discs affixed to the wall or standing structures by trails of thread. As Ken Johnson noted in The New York Times in 2001, the works have a biological appearance: their “…hand sewn red discs clustered like rose petals or blood corpuscles…” Works from Humphrey's Loculus series were included in Site and Insight, curated by Agnes Gund at MoMA PS1 in 2003.

=== Residency At New York University's LeDoux Lab (2005-2023) ===
Since 2005, Humphrey has been an artist in residence at the LeDoux Neuroscience Laboratory at New York University, where she collaborates with Dr. Joseph LeDoux and his team. Humphrey “wanted to find ways of not only asking questions about our emotions and how the brain processes those emotions but to visualize and conceptually explore that information in the work.” With a focus on the neuroscience of emotions and the amygdala, Humphrey's research at the lab has resulted in drawings, videos, and audio recordings that often culminate in installations and performances. These works include drawings creating using a microscope equipped with a camera lucida, sound recordings of neural activity, and the artist's own MRIs.

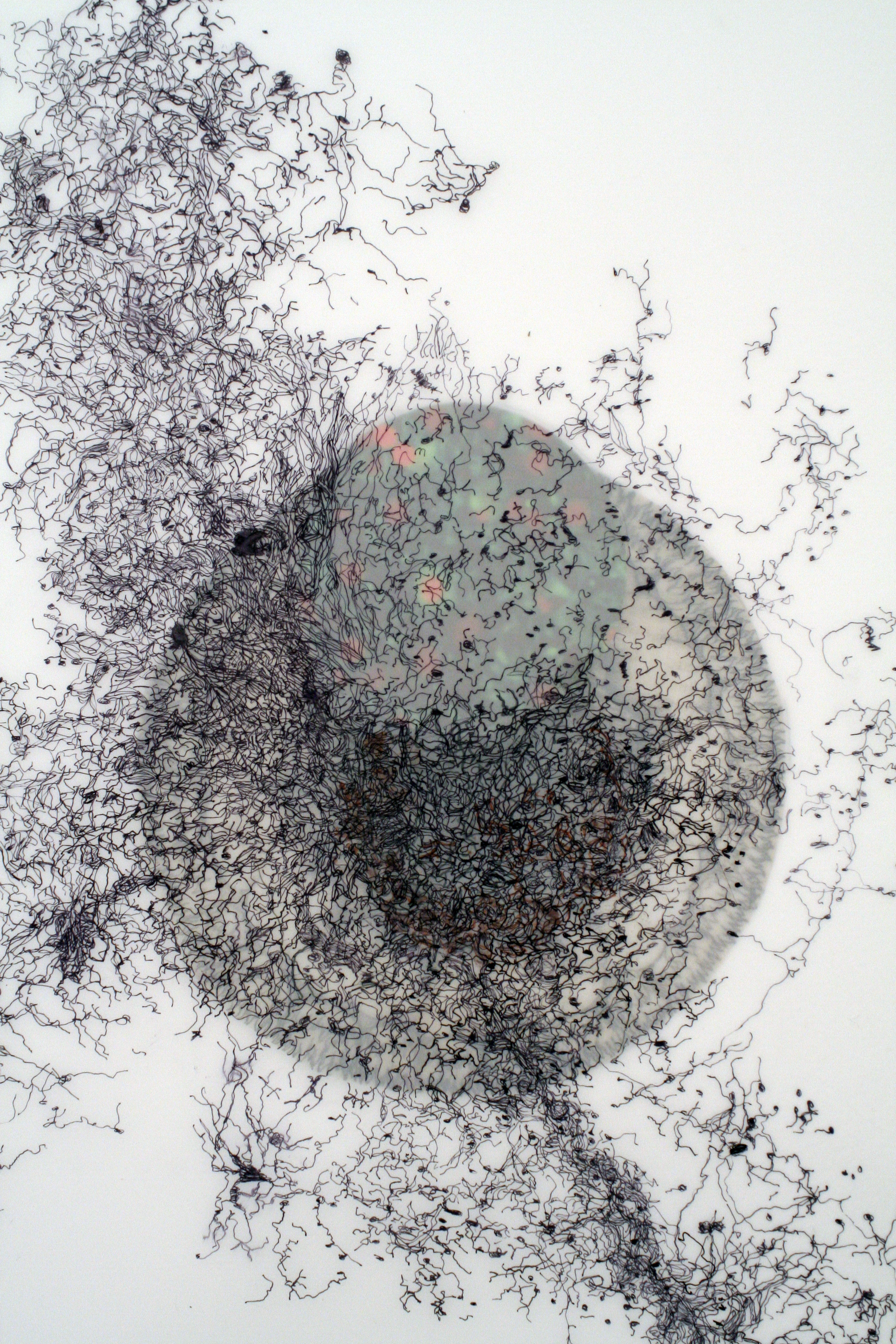
Menerbes, drawing, 2009

Collaboration across disciplines has become increasingly important to Humphrey's practice. Collaborators include director Mallory Catlett, musicians Roberto Carlos Lange, Matana Roberts, Zibuokle Martinaityte, Anaïs Maviel, cellist Clare Monfredo and video and sound designer Simon Harding.

=== Circling the Center (2008-2019) ===
Following the death of her husband in 2006, Humphrey embarked upon a multidisciplinary project reflecting on the psychological process of mourning and its physiological index in the mourner's brain titled Circling the Center. Inspired by the practice of Victorian mourning braiding, this body of work draws formal parallels between the patterns that the braiding ritual creates and Humphrey's amygdala drawings. To combat the isolation of grief, and return the practice to its communal roots, Humphrey developed a series of multi-media installations and performances that incorporate all her research interests.

Its first iteration debuted at Lesley Heller Gallery in 2009 under the title, The Plain Sense of Things, an installation that included wall-based sculptures of braided wire. Of the multiple levels of emotion the exhibition confronted, New York Times critic Holland Cotter wrote, “Order and chaos do battle here; the territory charted is both global… and microscopic.”

From 2009 to 2017, Humphrey staged several iterations of Circling the Center as a performance, inviting the audience to participate in a communal act of remembrance. These performances included a circle of braiders, forming wire according to traditional instructions that were chanted aloud. Their ritual was amplified by film images, animated MRIs, live video, and recorded sounds like the songs of lab rats and metronomes. These performances rely on collaboration between Humphrey and Roberto C. Lange, Zoe FitzGerald, Capucine Gros, and Noah Hoffeld. Such multimedia collaborations characterize Humphrey's recent work and place the artist in what Cristina Albu referred to as "...the role of [a] hidden orchestrator of a drama that transcends individual tragedy."

=== Transmission (2018) ===
Shown at Lesley Heller Gallery in 2018, Transmission depicted “a moment where the braiding ritual has ended but the process of mourning remains, both in the physical objects of the ritual and in the nebulous space of the brain.”

The exhibition included an installation that ritualized the braiding set-up that Humphrey had used in Circling the Center, including video footage of performances, and an empty braiding table. There are side tables that display the materials used in the weaving process including spools and the various gauges of wire employed in Humphrey's version of the practice.

A second iteration of Transmission that incorporated a sound recording of the poem “If You Were to Peer into the Mourner’s Skull” by Tom Sleigh was shown at the Elizabeth Foundation for the Arts in 2019, as part of In the Presence of Absence, curated by Jillian Steinhauer.

== 2020s ==
=== This Like a Dream Keeps Other Time (2020-) ===
Since 2020, Humphrey has begun working with the complex and emotional landscape of dreams. Inspired by a dream the artist had of learning to sing in her late husband's family church in rural Georgia, these works explore the role of dreams in psychological health and well-being. As in Circling the Center, Humphrey became interested in the emotional and biological effects of communal practice, in this case, singing.

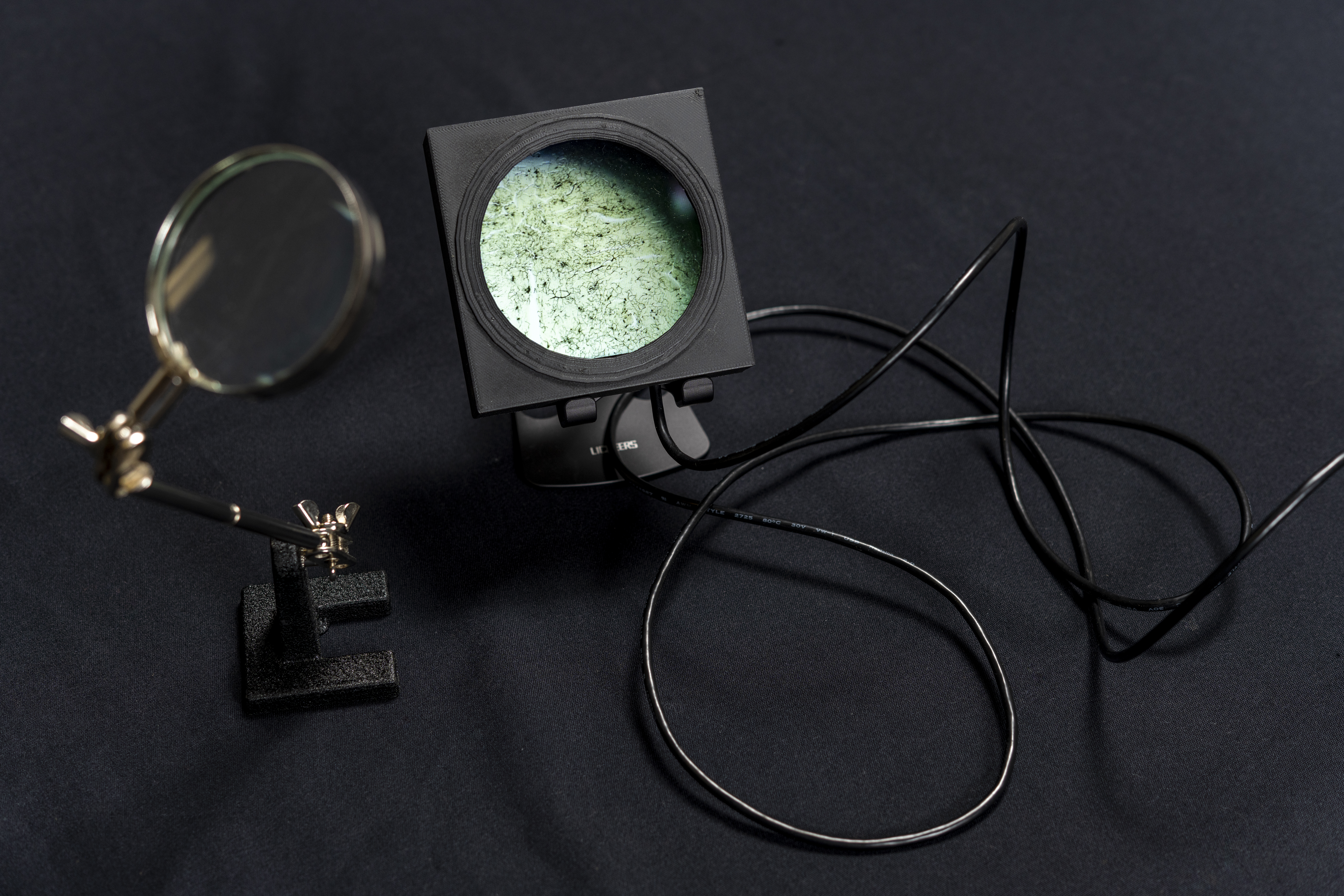
Installation view, This Like A Dream Keeps Other Time, 2023

The 2023 iteration shown at Catskill Art Space in Livingston Manor, NY, incorporated installations of Humphrey's scroll drawings with photographs and video images of the microscopic amygdala that the artist has been working with at the LeDoux lab. In Searching (2021–2022) Humphrey displays these videos in scientific-looking boxes alongside magnifying glasses, recreating for the viewer the optical process from which she has been drawing for fifteen years.

Throughout the installation, a layered and repetitive soundtrack written and recorded by Matana Roberts evokes call and response, tapping into the emotional and biological feedback loops on display. According to Christina Albu, This Like A Dream Keeps Other Time “stirs a consciousness of the interrelated rhythms of sounds, brain waves, and affective fluctuations. An awareness of these consonances which usually remain under the radar can offer us a pathway to healing through self-transformation and communion.”

== Career ==
Humphrey is the recipient of the Watermill Foundation Award (2021), The Brown Foundation Fellowship at the Dora Maar House (2019, 2009), The Agnes Gund Foundation Grant (2016, 2010), The MacDowell Colony Fellowship (2011, 2008, 1978), the Smithsonian Institution Artist Research Fellowship (2007), the Anonymous Was a Woman Award (1999), the Rockefeller Foundation Fellowship (1986), and the National Endowment for the Arts Artist Grant (1983).

== Selected Public Collections ==
Museum of Fine Arts Houston

Smithsonian Institution

High Museum of Art

Herb and Dorothy Vogel Drawing Collection

Philadelphia Museum of Art

Robert Hull Fleming Museum

Wilfredo Lam Contemporary Art Center
