= William Tappan Thompson =

American journalist

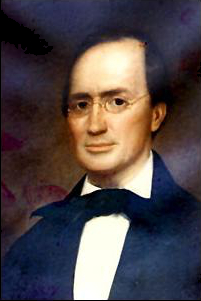
- Born: August 31, 1812; Ravenna, Ohio, U.S.
- Died: March 24, 1882 (aged 69); Savannah, Georgia, U.S.
- Resting place: Laurel Grove Cemetery
- Occupations: Writer, editor
- Organization: Savannah Daily Morning News
- Political party: Democratic

William Tappan Thompson (August 31, 1812 – March 24, 1882) was an American journalist. He co-founded the Savannah Morning News in the 1850s, known then as the Daily Morning News. One of his most notable works was Major Jones's Courtship, an epistolary novel. Thompson's best-known fictional character was Major Joseph Jones.

Originally from Ohio, Thompson moved to Savannah, Georgia, where he co-founded the Daily Morning News and became an editor, supporting the Confederacy during the U.S. Civil War.

== Life and career ==
Thompson was born on August 31, 1812, in Ravenna, Ohio. Upon moving to Savannah, in the 1850s, he cofounded the Savannah Morning News. Thompson left the paper in 1867 to travel in Europe. In 1868, he returned, and the paper was renamed Savannah Daily Morning News for one edition and was changed to the current name the following day.

The second national flag of the Confederacy, a design that Thompson promoted in his newspaper.

== Support for the Confederacy ==
Thompson supported the Confederacy during the American Civil War. In 1863, as the editor of the Morning News, he discussed a variant of a design that would ultimately become the Confederacy's second national flag, which would become known as the "Stainless Banner" or the "Jackson Flag" (for its first use as the flag that draped the coffin of Confederate Lt. Gen. Thomas "Stonewall" Jackson.)

In a series of editorials, Thompson wrote why he felt the design should be chosen to represent the Confederacy as "The White Man's Flag."

As a people, we are fighting to maintain the heaven ordained supremacy of the white man over the inferior or colored race: a white flag would thus be emblematical of our cause.

After the editorial was published, the editor of the Savannah Morning News received a dispatch announcing the senate had adopted the flag Thompson suggested, with certain revisions. Thompson states his objections to the additions on the April 28.

While we consider the flag which has been adopted by the senate as a very decided improvement of the old United States flag, we still think the battle flag on a pure white field would be more appropriate and handsome.

Such a flag would be a suitable emblem of our young confederacy, and sustained by the brave hearts and strong arms of the south, it would soon take rank among the proudest ensigns of the nations, and be hailed by the civilized world as THE WHITE MAN'S FLAG...

As a people, we are fighting to maintain the Heaven-ordained supremacy of the white man over the inferior or colored race; a white flag would thus be emblematical of our cause....[sic].

On May 4, 1863, Thompson pens his approval of the changes to the flag design that the Confederate Congress utilized which were akin to those he and his supporters suggested:

We are pleased to learn by dispatch from Richmond that congress has had the good taste to adopt for the flag of the confederacy, the battle flag on a plain white field in lieu of the blue and white bars proposed by the senate. The flag as adopted is precisely the same as that suggested by us a short time since, and is, in our opinion, much more beautiful and appropriate than either the red and white bars or the white field and blue bar as first adopted by the senate.

Thompson further explains the significance:

As a national emblem, it is significant of our higher cause, the cause of a superior race, and a higher civilization contending against ignorance, infidelity, and barbarism. Another merit in the new flag is, that it bears no resemblance to the now infamous banner of the Yankee vandals.

The May 2, 1863 Richmond Whig newspaper printed quotes from Confederate Representatives as to what the colors and design of the newly adopted flag represented.

As to the color, that should also have meaning. If we adopted blue, it would be said that our affairs looked blue. The white in the flag signified purity and truth - Confederate Congressman Alexander Boteler

Then we would have the Battle Flag of glorious memories, and a white field signifying purity, truth, and freedom. - Confederate Congressman Peter W. Gray

Both Boteler and Gray were members of the House of Representatives Flag and Seal Committee. It was Gray who proposed the amendment that gave the flag its white field.

== Late life and death ==
After the Civil War ended, Thompson, who was a fervent supporter of the Democrats, opposed the Republican Party's efforts in the South. He died on March 24, 1882, in Savannah, Georgia. He was buried in Laurel Grove Cemetery.

== See also ==
- Georgia in the American Civil War
- Literature of Georgia (U.S. state)
- Flags of the Confederate States of America
- Politics of the Southern United States
- Democratic Party (United States)
