= Brooks Pennington Jr. =

American politician (1925–1996)

Brooks M. Pennington Junior (October 21, 1925 – May 23, 1996) was an American businessman, author, politician and philanthropist from Georgia.

== Early years ==
He attended North Georgia College in 1943–1944, before serving as a USAF captain in the Korean War, and later graduated from University of Georgia with degrees in engineering and agronomy.

== Pennington Seed ==
Whilst still at college, Pennington began working in the family retail feed and seed store founded in Madison, Georgia in 1945 on Main Street by his father, Brooks Pennington Sr. Over the course of 50 years, he built a warehouse and developed the wholesale side of the business and also developed new agricultural crop varieties, seed coatings and seed treatments. He retired as president and Chairman of Pennington Seed Inc. due to ill health in the mid-1990s., the annual turn-over had grown to over $200 million. Pennington was also served as president of the Georgia Seedsmen's Association, the Southern Seedsmen's Association, and the Southern Field Seed Council. His book Seeds and Planting in the South is regarded as a standard text-book for many agricultural colleges. In September 2003, Pennington was entered posthumously into the Georgia Agricultural Hall of Fame.

== Politics ==
Pennington served as a member of the Georgia House of Representatives and was elected to the Georgia State Senate, serving for eight years as Chairman of the Georgia Senate Agriculture and Natural Resources Committee, as well as holding positions on a number of other committees. He was also State Campaign Chairman for President Jimmy Carter's first campaign for governor of Georgia in 1966 (unsuccessful), and later an agricultural campaign advisor during Carter's 1976 presidential campaign.

== Philanthropy ==
Pennington donated his political pay to the Brooks Pennington Sr. Scholarship Fund (named after his father), which by September 2003, had enabled over 30 students to attend college. He served as the chairman of the Morgan County Hospital Authority, vice chairman of Morgan County Foundation, president of the Morgan County Touchdown Club, and was the Commander of the Morgan County, Georgia VFW, among other positions. After his death, his estate endowed the Brooks Pennington Jr. Military Leadership Center at North Georgia College & State University (NGCSU) in November 2004.

== Accolades ==
He was recognised by the NGCSU Alumni Association in the Hall of Fame (1973) and as Distinguished Alumnus (1974).

== Personal life ==
He married Jacquelyn Christian Pennington, with whom he had four children. In October 2006, his son, Brooks "Sonny" Pennington III, resigned after 10 years as president and CEO of Pennington Seed (now part of Walnut Creek based conglomerate Central Garden & Pet) to take on the role of Director of Special Projects. Another son, Dan Pennington, is in charge of the manufacturing strategic business unit.
