= Savannah Morning News =

Daily newspaper published in Savannah, Georgia

Savannah Morning News & savannahnow.com

- Front page of the June 22, 2024, issue
- Type: Daily newspaper
- Format: Broadsheet
- Owner: USA Today Co.
- Editor: Jill Nevels
- Founded: 1850 (176 years ago) (as the Daily Morning News)
- Headquarters: 1375 Chatham Parkway; Savannah, GA 31405; United States
- Circulation: 16,959 Daily; 19,284 Sunday (as of 2018)
- ISSN: 1047-028X
- OCLC number: 51656980
- Website: savannahnow.com

The Savannah Morning News is a daily newspaper in Savannah, Georgia. It is published by Gannett. The motto of the paper is "Light of the Coastal Empire and Lowcountry". The paper serves Savannah, its metropolitan area, and parts of South Carolina.

== History ==
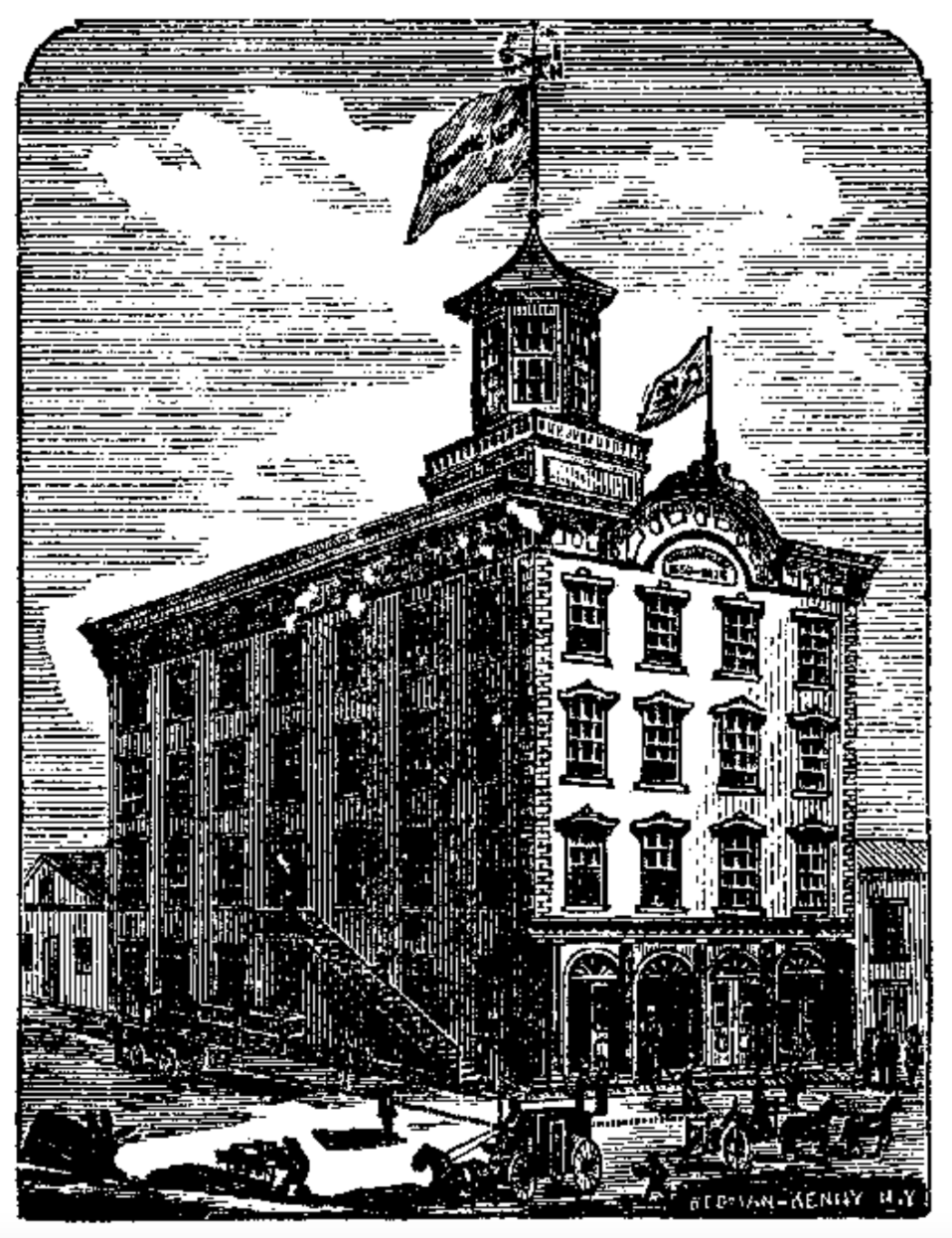
Morning News building, 1876

William Tappan Thompson, author of the Major Jones series of humorous stories, along with John McKinney Cooper as publisher and owner, founded the paper on January 15, 1850 as the Daily Morning News. At the end of the Civil War in 1865, John Cooper was pardoned by President Andrew Johnson allowing him to retain ownership of the paper. Its name was changed to the Daily News and Herald, though Thompson remained as editor. Thompson left the paper in 1867 to travel in Europe. In 1868, Thompson returned and the paper was renamed again to The Savannah Daily Morning News for one edition, then changed to the current name the following day. In 1870, Joel Chandler Harris, who later went on to write the Uncle Remus tales, became an assistant editor. As assistant editor, Harris launched a successful campaign to outlaw dueling, which was still popular in Savannah in the mid-19th century.

Banker Mills B. Lane, Jr. and publisher Alvah H. Chapman bought the Morning News and the Savannah Evening Press in 1957 and combined some operations as the Savannah News-Press Inc. The papers were again sold in 1960 to William Shivers Morris Jr., owner of the Augusta Chronicle. In 1969, the staffs of the Savannah Evening Press and the Savannah Morning News merged and in 1972 a combined Sunday edition called the Savannah News-Press was published. As evening newspapers were becoming less profitable due to competition by evening news programs on television, the Evening Press was cancelled, running its last issue on October 31, 1996. This left the Morning News as the only major daily newspaper of Savannah.

In 2017, Morris Communications sold its newspapers to GateHouse Media.

In March 2022, The Savannah Morning News moved to a six day printing schedule, eliminating its printed Saturday edition.

== Circulation ==
The reported numbers for the Savannah Morning News' Daily Total Circulation was 5,627 printed copies as of March 31, 2024 – an average over 18 months prior, plus 1,317 “Digital Only” subscribers. Sunday Circulation was 7,024 print copies and 1,302 “Digital Only” subscribers. Saturday “Digital Only” circulation was 1,481. The audit report does not show how much of any figure is paid vs. Free; employee copies, etc. Circulation numbers as of the six months ended September 30, 2009, were 39,656 daily and 52,493 on Sundays. In June 2005, the daily circulation was reported at 53,825, a 26.3% drop. As of July 2013, the newspaper's primary website, savannahnow.com, remained the most-viewed local news source in the Savannah metropolitan area, with an estimated 75,000 unique visitors monthly and roughly 7 million page views monthly, according to Quantcast.

== Subsidiaries ==
In March 2013, the Savannah Morning News expanded its arts and entertainment section "Do" into a free standalone alt-weekly distributed at roughly 200 newsstands across Chatham County and through a new website and mobile app. In April 2013, the newspaper launched a new company called Main Street Digital.

Subsidiaries include Bryan County Now and Effingham Now.

== See also ==
- List of newspapers in Georgia (U.S. state)

== Sources ==
- Shippey, Herbert: William Tappon Thompson from the New Georgia Encyclopedia Online (2002-07-18). Retrieved on 2009-04-08.
- Morris subsidiary profile of the Savannah Morning News
