= Flaherty =

Flaherty is a surname of Irish origin derived from the clan Ó Flaithbheartaigh/O'Flaherty. It may refer to:

== People ==
- Charles Flaherty (alpine skier) (born 2000), American skier
- Charles Flaherty (politician) (born 1938), American politician
- Daniel Flaherty (born 1993), American actor
- Danny Flaherty (1873–1901), Australian rules footballer
- David Flaherty (1928–2020), American businessman and politician
- Dick Flaherty (1900–1984), American National Football League player
- Fionnuala Flaherty, 21st century Irish actress
- Frances H. Flaherty (1883–1972), American film director and screenwriter
- Francis C. Flaherty (1919–1941), American Medal of Honor recipient
- Francis Flaherty (judge) (born 1947), justice on the Rhode Island Supreme Court
- Gilly Flaherty (born 1991), English former footballer
- Jack Flaherty (born 1995), American Major League Baseball pitcher
- Jack Flaherty (gymnast) (1908–1980), British Olympic gymnast
- Jack Flaherty (politician) (1933–2025), Canadian politician
- James A. Flaherty (1853–1937), American lawyer and Supreme Knight of the Knights of Columbus
- James Louis Flaherty (1910–1975), American Catholic bishop
- Jim Flaherty (1949–2014), Canadian politician, Federal Minister of Finances
- Joe Flaherty (1941–2024), American actor
- Joe Flaherty (politician) (born 1969/1970), Irish politician
- John Flaherty (disambiguation)
- Joseph A. Flaherty Jr. (1930–2018), American engineering executive
- Karen Flaherty, United States Navy rear admiral, former director of the United States Navy Nurse Corps
- Katelynn Flaherty (born 1996), American former college basketball player
- Larry Flaherty (1882–1979), Irish hurler
- Maggie Flaherty (ice hockey) (born 2000), American ice hockey player
- Mary Flaherty (disambiguation)
- Meredith Flaherty, American soccer coach and former player
- Michael Flaherty (disambiguation)
- Micheal Flaherty, American educator and entrepreneur
- Pat Flaherty (disambiguation)
- Paul Flaherty (computer scientist) (1964–2006), American computer scientist
- Paul Flaherty (musician) (born 1948), American jazz saxophonist
- Peter F. Flaherty (1924–2005), American politician and attorney
- Ray Flaherty (1903–1994), American National Football League and American Football League player and college and National Football League coach
- Richard J. Flaherty (1945–2015), United States Army officer and CIA agent
- Robert J. Flaherty (1884–1951), American filmmaker, director and producer of the first commercially successful feature-length documentary
- Ryan Flaherty (born 1986), American Major League Baseball coach and former player
- Sean Flaherty (politician) (born 1985), American politician
- Shawn Flaherty (fl. 2006), American politician
- Stephen Flaherty (born 1960), American composer of musical theater and film
- Thomas Flaherty (disambiguation)
- Vincent Flaherty (fl. 1964–present), American producer, recording artist, writer, and political activist

== Fictional characters ==
- Michelle Flaherty, in the American Pie film series, played by Alyson Hannigan
- Deputy Mayor Mike Flaherty, main character of the television series Spin City, played by Michael J. Fox
- On the soap opera EastEnders:
  - Conor Flaherty
  - Eamonn Flaherty
  - Maggie Flaherty (EastEnders)
  - Mary Flaherty (EastEnders)
  - Sean Flaherty (EastEnders)

== See also ==
- Justice Flaherty (disambiguation)
- O'Flaherty, another surname
