= National Register of Historic Places listings in Morgan County, Georgia =

This is a list of properties and districts in Morgan County, Georgia that are listed on the National Register of Historic Places (NRHP).

This National Park Service list is complete through NPS recent listings posted March 21, 2025.

== Current listings ==
	Name on the Register	Image	Date listed	Location	City or town	Description
1	Apalachee School	Apalachee School	May 26, 2000 (#00000527)	5060 Lower Apalachee Rd. 33°41′22″N 83°26′10″W	Apalachee	
2	Nathan Bennett House	Nathan Bennett House	November 13, 1974 (#74000695)	Dixie Ave. 33°35′12″N 83°29′17″W	Madison	
3	Bonar Hall	Bonar Hall	January 20, 1972 (#72000388)	Dixie Ave. 33°35′15″N 83°28′54″W	Madison	
4	Bostwick Historic District		October 22, 2002 (#02001221)	Jct. of Bostwick Rd. and Fairplay Rd. 33°44′12″N 83°30′55″W	Bostwick	
5	Buckhead Historic District	Buckhead Historic District	March 1, 2002 (#02000097)	Roughly bounded by Main St. and Parks Mill, Seven Islands and Baldwin Dairy Rds. 33°34′01″N 83°21′41″W	Buckhead	
6	Cedar Lane Farm		February 24, 1971 (#71000281)	N of Madison off GA 83; 33°39′30″N 83°30′54″W	Madison	
7	Hard Labor Creek State Park	Hard Labor Creek State Park	March 27, 2013 (#13000107)	Fairplay & Knox Chapel Rds. 33°39′35″N 83°36′08″W	Rutledge vicinity	
8	Madison Historic District	Madison Historic District	October 29, 1974 (#74000696)	Roughly bounded on both sides by U.S. 441 (original); Roughly Main St., Old Post Rd., Academy St., Dixie St., and Washington St. (increase); 33°35′37″N 83°28′16″W	Madison	Boundary increase approved on January 8, 1990.
9	James A. Nolan House	James A. Nolan House	June 28, 2019 (#100004106)	4690 A Bostwick Hwy. 33°42′29″N 83°29′59″W	Madison	
10	John O'Flaherty House	John O'Flaherty House	August 29, 1991 (#91001155)	1000 Oconee Rd. 33°34′07″N 83°21′35″W	Buckhead	
11	Rutledge Historic District		May 22, 2003 (#03000429)	Centered along Main St., The Georgia Railroad (CSX), E. Dixis Hwy, and Fairplay Rd. 33°37′35″N 83°36′44″W	Rutledge	
12	Susie Agnes Hotel	Susie Agnes Hotel	July 1, 1994 (#94000664)	Main St. 33°44′14″N 83°30′52″W	Bostwick	
13	Wilson-Finney-Land House	Wilson-Finney-Land House	February 11, 2004 (#04000021)	1750 Bethany Rd. 33°34′38″N 83°27′13″W	Madison	
14	Zachry-Kingston House	Zachry-Kingston House	May 18, 1987 (#87000796)	6030 Bethany Rd. 33°30′41″N 83°19′51″W	Buckhead	
