= Finney House =

Finney House may refer to:

- Dr. Frank Finney House, La Junta, Colorado, listed on the National Register of Historic Places (NRHP)
- Wilson-Finney-Land House, Madison, Georgia, listed on the NRHP in Morgan County, Georgia
- Joseph Finney House, Bloomingdale, Indiana, listed on the NRHP in Parke County, Indiana
- Hite-Finney House, Martinsville, Indiana, NRHP-listed
- Warren Wesley Finney House, Emporia, Kansas, listed on the NRHP in Lyon County, Kansas
- Finney Houses Historic District, Churchville, Maryland, NRHP-listed
- Finney House (Nevada City, Montana), listed on the NRHP in Madison County, Montana
- Finney-Darrah House, Martin's Ferry, Ohio, listed on the NRHP in Ohio
- Prewitt-Amis-Finney House, Culleoka, Tennessee, listed on the NRHP in Tennessee
- Wofford-Finney House, Cuero, Texas, listed on the NRHP in Texas
- Finney-Lee House, Snow Creek, Virginia, NRHP-listed

== See also ==
- Finney Hotel, in Woodbury, Kentucky; NRHP-listed
