= O'Flaherty =

O'Flaherty is a surname of Irish origin derived from Ó Flaithbheartaigh. It may refer to:

- Anthony O'Flaherty (1800–1866), Irish politician
- Bill O'Flaherty, Canadian ice hockey player, coach and executive, son of "Peanuts" O'Flaherty
- Bridie O'Flaherty (1917–2006), Irish politician, mayor of Galway
- Colm O'Flaherty (born 1950), Irish retired Gaelic footballer
- Colman O'Flaherty (1878–1918), Irish-born American military chaplain posthumously awarded the Distinguished Service Cross
- Edmond O'Flaherty (died 1749), Irish Jacobite
- Edmund O'Flaherty (1821–1886), Irish Member of Parliament and businessman in the United States
- Eliza O'Flaherty (1818–1882), Australian writer and stage actress
- Eric O'Flaherty (born 1985), American former Major League Baseball pitcher
- Eugene O'Flaherty (born 1968), American lawyer and politician
- Eva O'Flaherty (1874–1963), Irish nationalist, model, patron of the arts and London milliner
- Gerry O'Flaherty (born 1950), Canadian-American former National Hockey League player
- Hugh O'Flaherty (1898–1963), Irish Catholic priest who saved thousands of Allied soldiers and Jews from the Nazis in World War II
- Hugh O'Flaherty (judge) (born 1937), Irish former judge of the Supreme Court of Ireland and barrister
- Joe Flaherty (1941–2024) né O'Flaherty, American actor, writer and comedian
- John O'Flaherty (politician) (1821–1886), Irish-born American politician
- Kate Chopin (1850–1904), née O'Flaherty, American author of short stories and novels
- Kathleen O'Flaherty (1916–1994), Irish scholar, academic and writer on French literature
- Liam O'Flaherty (1896–1984), Irish novelist and short story writer
- Liam O'Flaherty (footballer), Irish footballer in the 1980s and '90s
- May O'Flaherty (1904–1991), Irish bookshop operator and literary patron
- Michael O'Flaherty, Commissioner for Human Rights of the Council of Europe
- Michael O'Flaherty (politician) (1891–1952), mayor of Galway, Ireland
- Paddy O'Flaherty (1942/3–2016), broadcaster and journalist from Northern Ireland
- Paddy O'Flaherty (Gaelic footballer) (born 1933), Irish retired Gaelic footballer
- Patrick O'Flaherty (politician) (1928–1989), mayor of Galway
- Patrick O'Flaherty (writer) (1939–2017), Canadian writer, historian and academic
- Peanuts O'Flaherty (1918–2008), Canadian National Hockey League player
- Roderick O'Flaherty (1629–1718 or 1716), Irish historian
- Samuel O'Flaherty (1895–1930), Irish politician
- Sid O'Flaherty (1886–1967), Australian politician
- Terry O'Flaherty, Mayor of Galway (2003–2004)
- Tom Maidhc O'Flaherty (1890–1936), Irish communist politician
- Tom O'Flaherty (rugby union) (born 1994), English rugby union footballer

== See also ==
- Flaherty, a surname
