= Morgan County School District =

School district in Georgia (U.S. state)

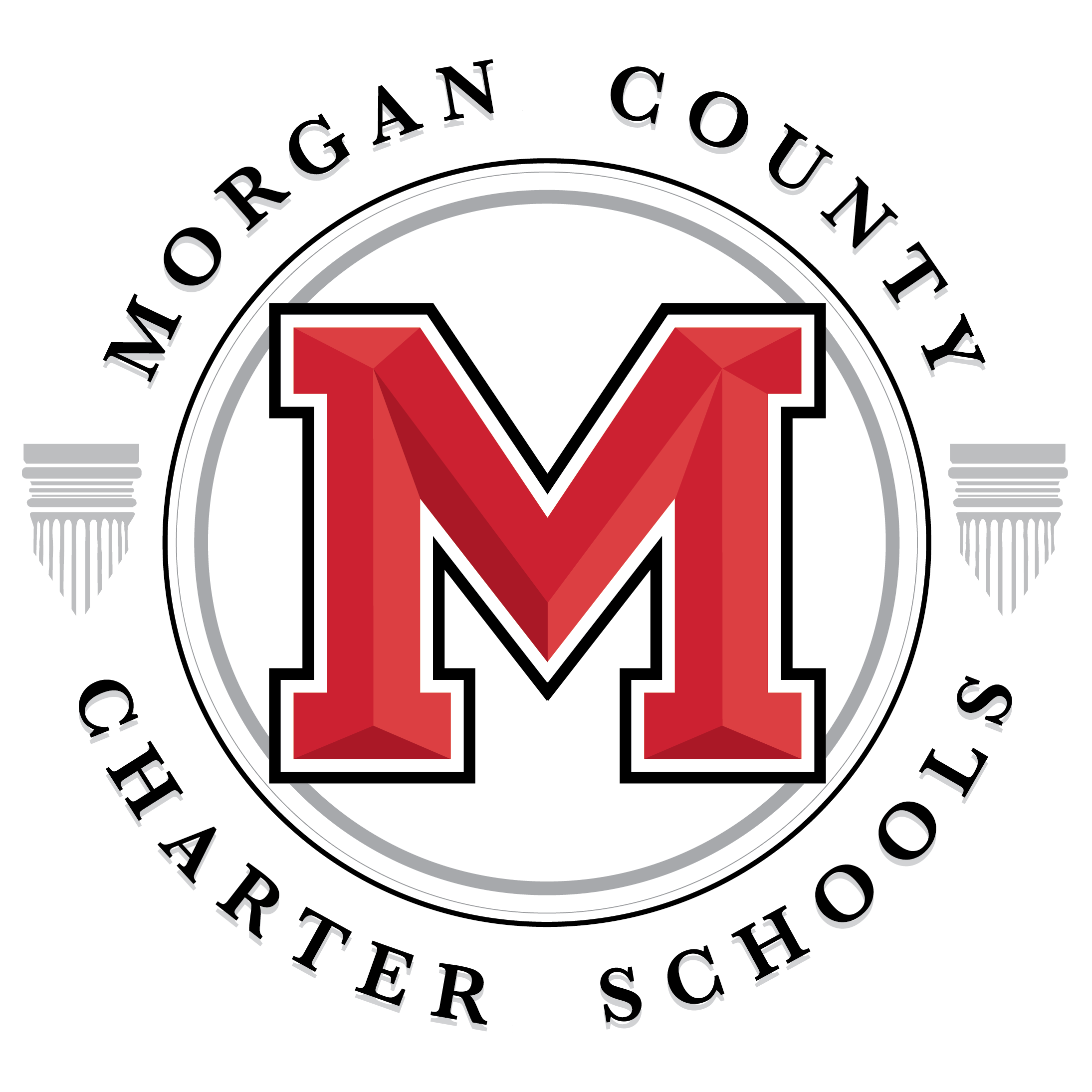

Address
- 1065 East Avenue Madison, Georgia, 30650-1468; United States
- Coordinates: 33.595208°N 83.45504°W

District information
- Grades: Pre-school - 12
- Superintendent: Susan Stancil
- Accreditations: Southern Association of Colleges and Schools; Georgia Accrediting Commission

Students and staff
- Enrollment: 3,496
- Faculty: 520

Other information
- Telephone: (706) 752-4600
- Fax: (706) 752-4601
- Website: morgan.k12.ga.us

The Morgan County School District is a public school district in Morgan County, Georgia, United States, based in Madison. It serves the communities of Bostwick, Buckhead, Madison, and Rutledge.

== Schools ==
The Morgan County School District has two elementary schools, one middle school, and one high school, and one alternative school.

=== Elementary schools ===
- Morgan County Elementary School
- Morgan County Primary School

=== Middle school ===
- Morgan County Middle School

=== High school ===
- Morgan County High School

=== Alternative school ===
- Morgan County Crossroads School
