= Flaherty (disambiguation) =

Flaherty is a surname. It may also refer to:

- Flaherty, Kentucky, an unincorporated community
- Flaherty Island, Nunavut, Canada
- USS Flaherty, a destroyer escort which served in World War II
