= John O'Flaherty =

John O'Flaherty may refer to:

- John Peanuts O'Flaherty (1918–2008), Canadian National Hockey League player
- John O'Flaherty (politician) (1821–1886), Irish-born American politician
- John O'Flaherty, former owner of John O'Flaherty House

== See also ==
- John Flaherty (disambiguation)
