= Joe Costello =

Joe or Joseph Costello may refer to:

- Joe Costello (politician) (born 1945), Irish Labour Party politician
- Joseph Costello (software executive) (born 1953), American computer software executive
- Joseph Arthur Costello (1915–1978), American bishop of the Catholic Church
- Joseph J. Costello (1892–1960), mayor of Galway
- Joe Costello (American football) (born 1960), American football defensive end
