= Zachry-Kingston House =

- U.S. National Register of Historic Places
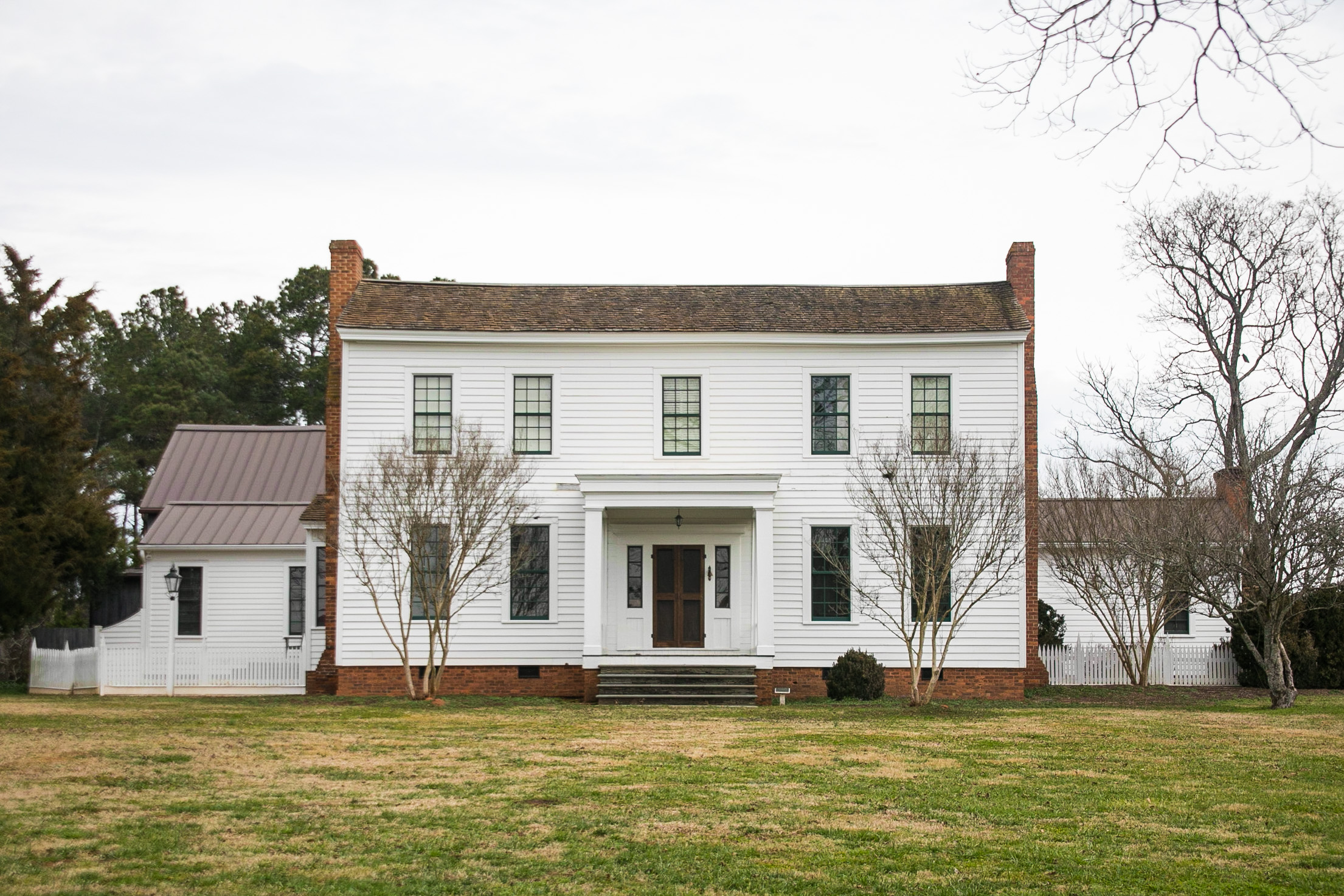

- Location within Georgia
- Nearest city: Buckhead, Morgan County, Georgia
- Coordinates: 33°30′41″N 83°19′51″W
- Area: 7.8 acres (3.2 ha)
- Built: 1830
- Architectural style: Plantation plain
- NRHP reference No.: 87000796
- Added to NRHP: May 18, 1987

The Zachry-Kingston House, in Morgan County, Georgia, near Buckhead, was built in 1830. It was listed on the National Register of Historic Places in 1987.

It is a two-story wood frame Plantation plain-style house with Federal detailing. It was restored in 1985.

It is located at 6030 Bethany Road, near the Oconee River in southeast Morgan County.

It is located directly on County Dirt Road No. 143.
