= Buckhead Historic District =

Historic district in Georgia, United States

- U.S. National Register of Historic Places
- U.S. Historic district
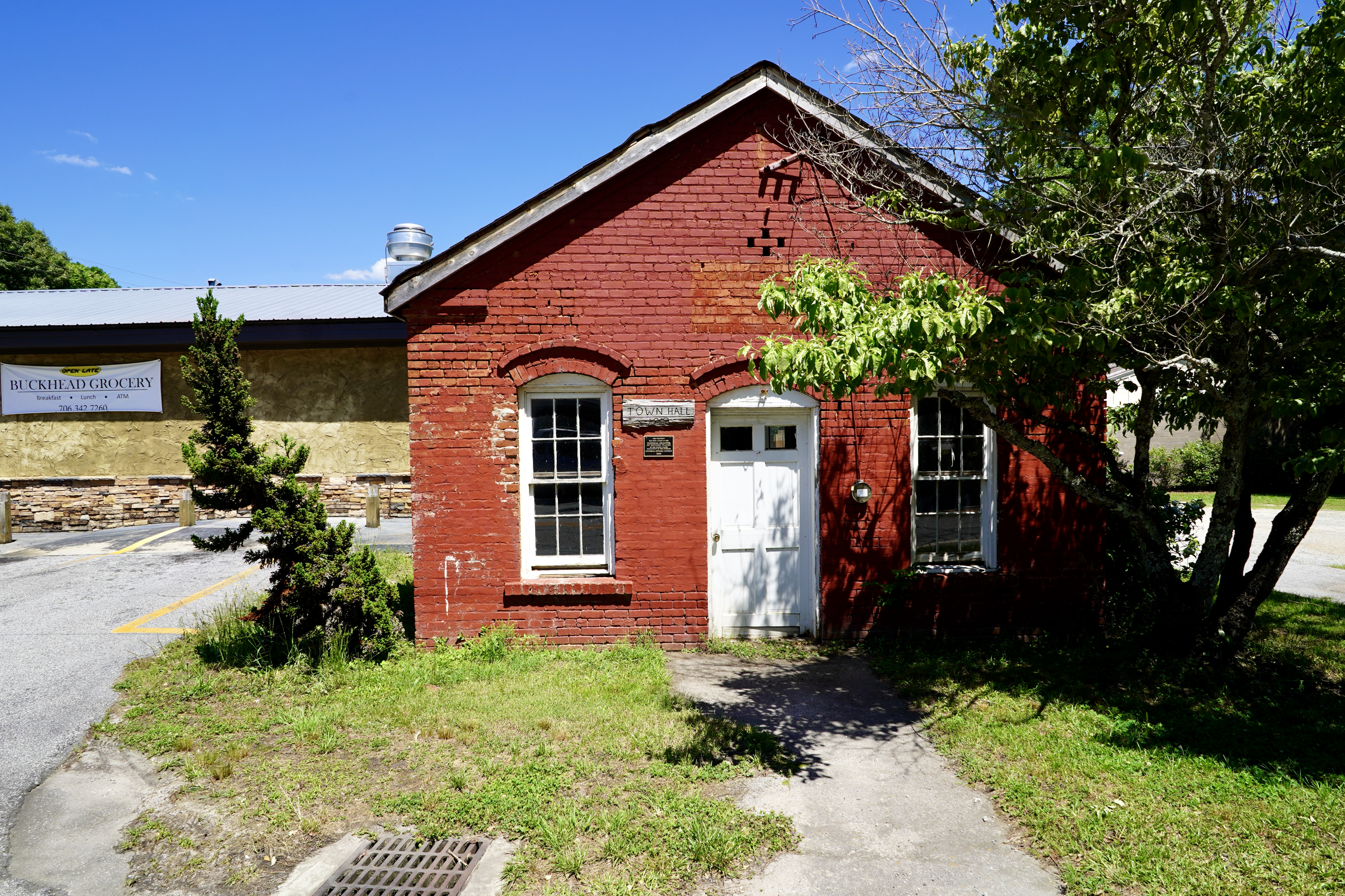

- Location within Georgia
- Location: Roughly bounded by Main St. and Parks Mill, Seven Islands and Baldwin Dairy Rds., Buckhead, Morgan County, Georgia
- Coordinates: 33°34′01″N 83°21′41″W
- Area: 94 acres (38 ha)
- Built: 1890
- Architectural style: Bungalow/craftsman, Folk Victorian
- NRHP reference No.: 02000097
- Added to NRHP: March 1, 2002

The Buckhead Historic District in Buckhead, Morgan County, Georgia, is a 94 acres (38 ha) historic district which was listed on the National Register of Historic Places in 2002.

It is roughly bounded by Main St., Parks Mill Rd., Seven Islands Rd. and Baldwin Dairy Rd. and included 44 contributing buildings, a contributing structure and a contributing site, as well as 22 non-contributing buildings.

It includes the John O'Flaherty House (c.1897), separately listed in the National Register in 1991.
