= Michael O'Flaherty (disambiguation) =

Michael O'Flaherty is the name of:

- Michael O'Flaherty (politician) (1891-1959), former mayor of Galway
- Michael O'Flaherty, Irish human rights lawyer, academic and United Nations official

== See also ==
- Michael Flaherty (disambiguation)
