= Institute of Professional Auctioneers and Valuers =

Irish association of real estate professionals

The Institute of Professional Auctioneers and Valuers (IPAV) is a professional association of auctioneers, valuers and estate agents in the island of Ireland.

IPAV was established in 1971, and has been a member of TEGOVA (The European Group of Valuers’ Associations) since 2013.

== Governance ==
IPAV's headquarters are in Baggot Street in Dublin. As at 2024, its president is John Kennedy. In 2023, some senior members of IPAV resigned citing a lack of transparency.

== Membership ==
As at 2022, there were over 1,400 members of IPAV. Members of IPAV use the post-nominal initials MIPAV.
