= Francis Flaherty =

Francis Flaherty may refer to:

- Francis C. Flaherty (1919–1941), United States Naval Reserve officer and Medal of Honor recipient
- Francis Flaherty (judge) (born 1947), justice on the Rhode Island Supreme Court

== See also ==
- Frances H. Flaherty (1883–1972), American film director and screenwriter
