= Bostwick Historic District =

Historic district in Georgia, United States

- U.S. National Register of Historic Places
- Location within Georgia
- Location: Jct. of Bostwick Rd. and Fairplay Rd., Bostwick, Georgia
- Coordinates: 33°44′12″N 83°30′55″W
- Area: 145 acres (59 ha)
- Built: c. 1859
- Architect: W.D. Calvin (Susie Agnes Hotel)
- Architectural style: Late 19th and 20th Century Revivals, Modern Movement
- NRHP reference No.: 02001221
- Added to NRHP: October 22, 2002

The Bostwick Historic District, in Bostwick, Georgia, is a historic district which was listed on the National Register of Historic Places in 2002. The listing included 64 contributing buildings, a contributing structure, and four contributing sites on 145 acres (59 ha).

It is centered on the intersection of Bostwick Rd. (Georgia State Route 83) and Fairplay Rd. in Bostwick.

The oldest historic resource is the Bostwick Cemetery, established around 1859.

It was deemed significant partly as it is a "good example of a rural town in Georgia which developed from the cultivation and processing of cotton. The district is significant in the areas of agriculture and industry for its excellent collection of industrial buildings associated with the processing of cotton as well as for the remaining cotton fields located within the district. John Bostwick, Sr. (1859-1929), considered the founder of the town, started Bostwick Supply Company in 1892. In 1901, he started the Bostwick Manufacturing Company that consisted of a cottonseed oil mill and other buildings (cotton gin, granary, grist mill, warehouse, guano/fertilizer building) associated with the manufacturing of goods from cotton. (All these buildings still remain.) Historically, the region surrounding the small town of Bostwick was primarily planted in cotton. Currently, much of this land has been planted with other crops, such as pine trees and peanuts, or left open to be used as pasture land for grazing by cattle. The fields planted in cotton within the district still convey the historic significant pattern in Georgia of agricultural fields abutting the town development."

It was deemed significant also for its architecture, specifically "for its excellent examples of historic residences, commercial, and community landmark buildings representing architectural types and styles popular in Georgia from the late 19th century into the early 20th century. The significant architectural types include Georgian cottage, gabled ell cottage, Queen Anne cottage, hall-parlor cottage, and bungalow. The significant architectural styles include Colonial Revival, Neoclassical Revival, Craftsman, and Folk Victorian. The John Bostwick, Sr. House, built in 1902, is an excellent representative example of a Georgian House, a two-story house with a central hallway on each floor with two rooms on either side, representing the Neoclassical Revival style. The character-defining features of the house include a full-height entry porch with lower full-width porch, truncated hipped roof, and wide cornice band. The historic stores are good examples of attached and freestanding buildings representing the Folk Victorian style. The character-defining features include a stepped parapet roof, recessed brick panels, and decorative arches over the windows and doors. The historic community landmark resources include two churches, the Susie Agnes Hotel, and the Bostwick Cemetery."
