= Colman O'Flaherty =

Colman E. O'Flaherty
- Born: 24 April 1874; Carraroe, Ireland
- Died: 3 October 1918 (aged 44); France
- Military career
- Allegiance: United States
- Branch: United States Army
- Unit: Chaplain Corps
- Awards: Distinguished Service Cross

Colman Edmond O'Flaherty (1878-1918) circa 1915

The Reverend Colman E. O'Flaherty (24 April 1878 – 3 October 1918), was an Irish-born American Catholic military chaplain and a recipient of the Distinguished Service Cross during World War I.

== Early life ==
O'Flaherty was born in Carraroe, Ireland. He received his early education in Ireland and continued his studies at Lyon, France where he became fluent in French and at Montreal, Canada. He was ordained a Roman Catholic priest at Sioux Falls on 15 September 1901 and spent the next nine years at Chamberlain and Kimball during which time he was responsible for the construction of seven church buildings including Columbus College at Chamberlain. In 1910 he was appointed to take charge of the Holy Family Church at Mitchell where he was instrumental in the development of Notre Dame Academy in Mitchell, South Dakota.

== Military career ==
He joined the American Expeditionary Force and was sent to France during World War I and served as an Army chaplain with the 28th Infantry, 1st Infantry Division. He was killed in action by shellfire on 3 October 1918. He was posthumously awarded the Distinguished Service Cross, the citation of which read: For extraordinary heroism near Véry, France, Chaplin O'Flaherty displayed conspicuous gallantry in administering to the wounded under terrific fire, exposing himself at all times to reach their sides, and give them aid. In the performance of this work, he was killed.

== Notable family ==
He was the older brother of Mayor of Galway Michael O'Flaherty (elected 1950) and uncle of Mayor of Galway Patrick O'Flaherty (born 1928, elected 1964).
