= Edmond O'Flaherty =

Edmond O'Flaherty (Irish: Eamonn Laidir Ó Flaithbertaigh, died 1749) was an Irish Jacobite.

== Biography ==
Ned Flahert was the grandson of Edmond mac Morogha na Maor and Morogh na Mart Ó Flaithbertaigh, sons of Morogh na Maor Ó Flaithbertaigh, (died 1627, who was the last substantial chief of the O'Flaherty clan. Both brothers fought in the Irish Confederate Wars.

O'Flaherty's epithet of Laidir (strong Ned) left a strong impression in Connemara folk memory, with several anecdotes relating to his strength. In particular, he was remembered for his frequent combats with his neighbour, Captain Richard Martin. Martin had fought with the Jacobites in the war, but had managed to obtain a pardon from William III, enabling him to keep title to several estates in Connemara. The pair frequently fought each other on horseback, sword on hand, though because Eamonn Laidir had fewer retainers he was usually obliged to leave the field. He married three times - one of his wives was Julia Martyn, a cousin of Richard Martin - and had four sons.

O'Flaherty died in deeply distressed circumstances at his home in Cloonederowen, Ballinakill, in or about 1749. His body was buried in a small chapel attached to Ballinakill church from where, many years later, they were taken up and placed in a niche in the chapel wall for people to see, due to the large size of Eamonn's bones.

== See also ==
- O'Flaherty
