= Mary Flaherty =

Mary Flaherty may refer to:

- Mary Flaherty (baseball) (1926–2000), All-American Girls Professional Baseball League player
- Mary Flaherty (politician) (born 1953), former Irish Fine Gael Party politician, TD 1981–1997
- May O'Flaherty (1904–1991), born Mary Flaherty, Irish bookshop operator and literary patron
- Mary Pat Flaherty (born 1955), American journalist

== Fictional characters ==
- Mary Flaherty, in the 2003 US sex comedy film American Wedding
- Mary Flaherty (EastEnders), in the UK TV soap opera EastEnders
