= Ballinakill, County Galway =

Bay in Ireland

Ballinakill
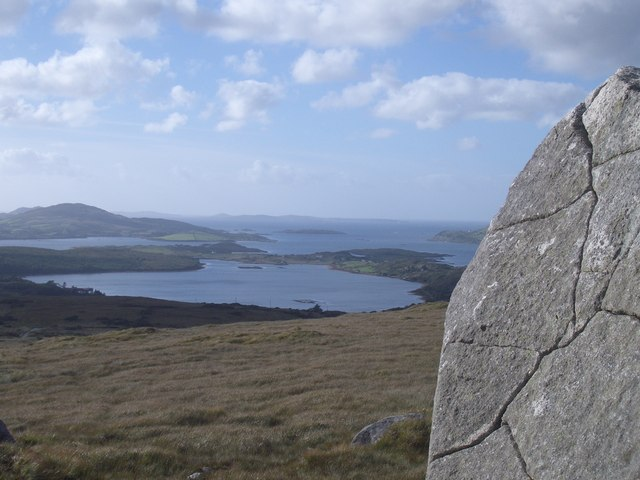
- Ballinakill harbour

- Location within Ireland
- Location: County Galway.
- Coordinates: 53°33′22″N 9°57′25″W
- Ocean/sea sources: Atlantic Ocean.
- Basin countries: Ireland
- Islands: Roeillaun

Ballinakill (Irish: Baile na Cille, meaning 'settlement of the church') is a natural harbour near the town of Letterfrack in County Galway in Ireland.

The harbour includes a number of islands such as Roeillaun (Red Island). Fish in this harbour include salmon, pollock and mackerel. A trip on a glass bottomed boat allows visitors to view the wildlife and scenery. A small museum (Oceans Alive) helps visitors to find out more about the area and its history. The harbour can be reached by turning towards Tully Cross at Letterfrack from the N59. Ballinakill is the final home and resting place of the Jacobite "Strong Ned" O'Flaherty.

== See also ==
- Tully Mountain
