= Apalachee, Georgia =

Unincorporated settlement in Georgia, US

Coordinates: 33°41′11″N 83°25′52″W

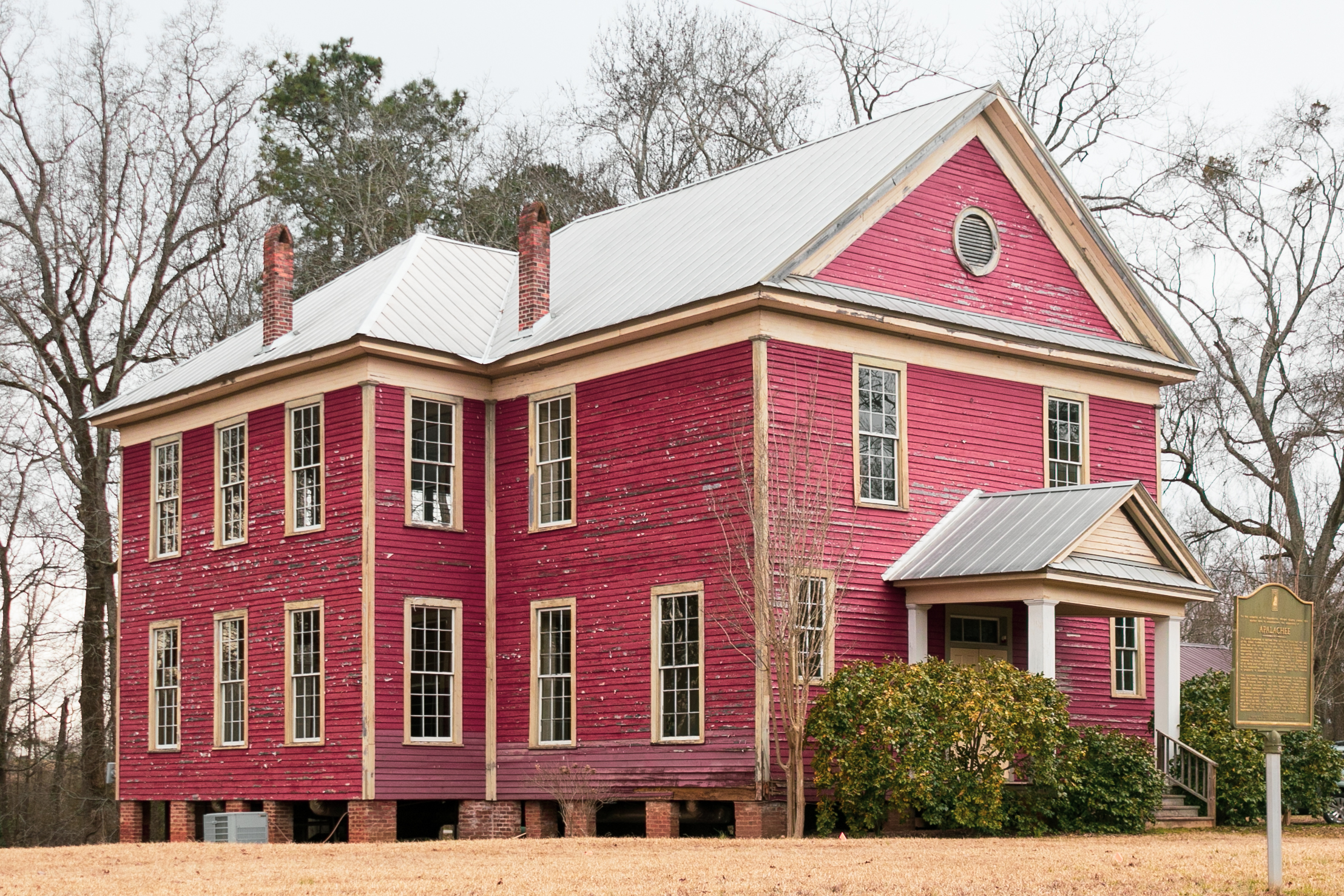
The school at Apalachee still stands and is listed on the National Register of Historic Places

Apalachee is an unincorporated settlement in Morgan County, in the U.S. state of Georgia. Apalachee was one of the earliest settlements in Morgan County. It stretches along Lower Apalachee and Parsonage Roads seven miles (10 km) north of the county seat of Madison.

== History ==
The first settlers arrived in the Apalachee area around 1820, making it one of the oldest communities in Morgan County. Apalachee was first known as Dogsboro (or Dogsborough), a name of unknown origin, in the years before a railroad line was built through the settlement.

In 1888, the Central of Georgia Railway opened a station in the settlement, which was followed by a post office the following year. The station was named Florence, for Florence Few, a daughter of Joe C. Few, one of the first settlers in the area and builder of the town's first store.

Due to the existence of another Florence in Georgia, the town adopted the name of Apalachee around 1896 from the name of the nearby Apalachee River, which in turn was named for Apalachee Indians.

By 1900, the community had 47 inhabitants. The Georgia General Assembly incorporated Apalachee as a town in August 1907.

Apalachee was considered a "prosperous town" in the early 20th century, with prosperity dependent on the transport of cotton. At its peak, the town had cotton gins, cotton seed presses, warehouses, two churches, a pharmacy, a physician, a general store, a Masonic lodge and a broom and handkerchief factory.

However, the town was hit so hard by losses from the boll weevil and Great Depression that it gradually declined in the latter part of the century. The post office closed in 1957 and the town was officially dissolved in 1995 along with many other inactive Georgia municipalities. The railroad has been removed. Few buildings still exist today, and most remaining structures are residences on the north side of Parsonage Road. The historic Apalachee School, the white elementary and middle school from 1911 to 1951, remains standing. (The school is being converted into a private home at this time.)
