= Mercy International Centre =

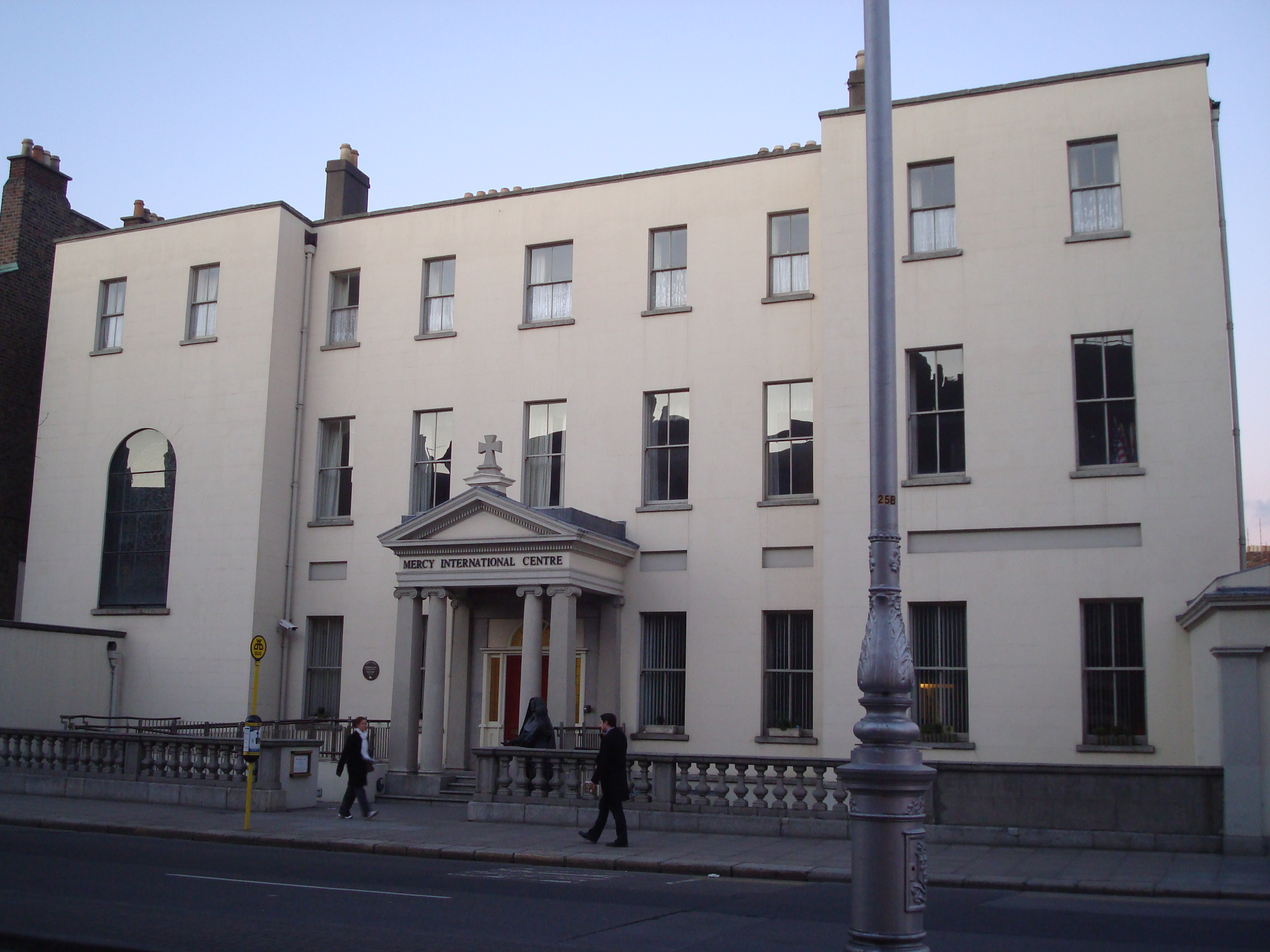

Mercy International Centre is the original house of the Sisters of Mercy. The building began in 1824 and the house was opened on 24 September 1827. As this was the feast day of Our Lady of Mercy, the house was called the House of Mercy. The instigator and owner of the house was Catherine McAuley, it is located on Lower Baggot Street, Dublin, Ireland. In 1994, Mercy International Association undertook its first major project by restoring the property. It was opened to the public by the then-President of Ireland, Mary Robinson and became known as Mercy International Centre.

Today Mercy International Association is a heritage place. You can book a tour of the Centre which runs at 10 am Mondays-Fridays and find out more about Catherine McAuley and her story, the legacy she left, and the work of the Sisters of Mercy and their associates throughout the world. There are also a variety of programmes offered at the centre which can be booked through the organisation's website. www.mercyworld.org
