= Finney–Lee House =

Historic house in Virginia, United States

- U.S. National Register of Historic Places
- Virginia Landmarks Register
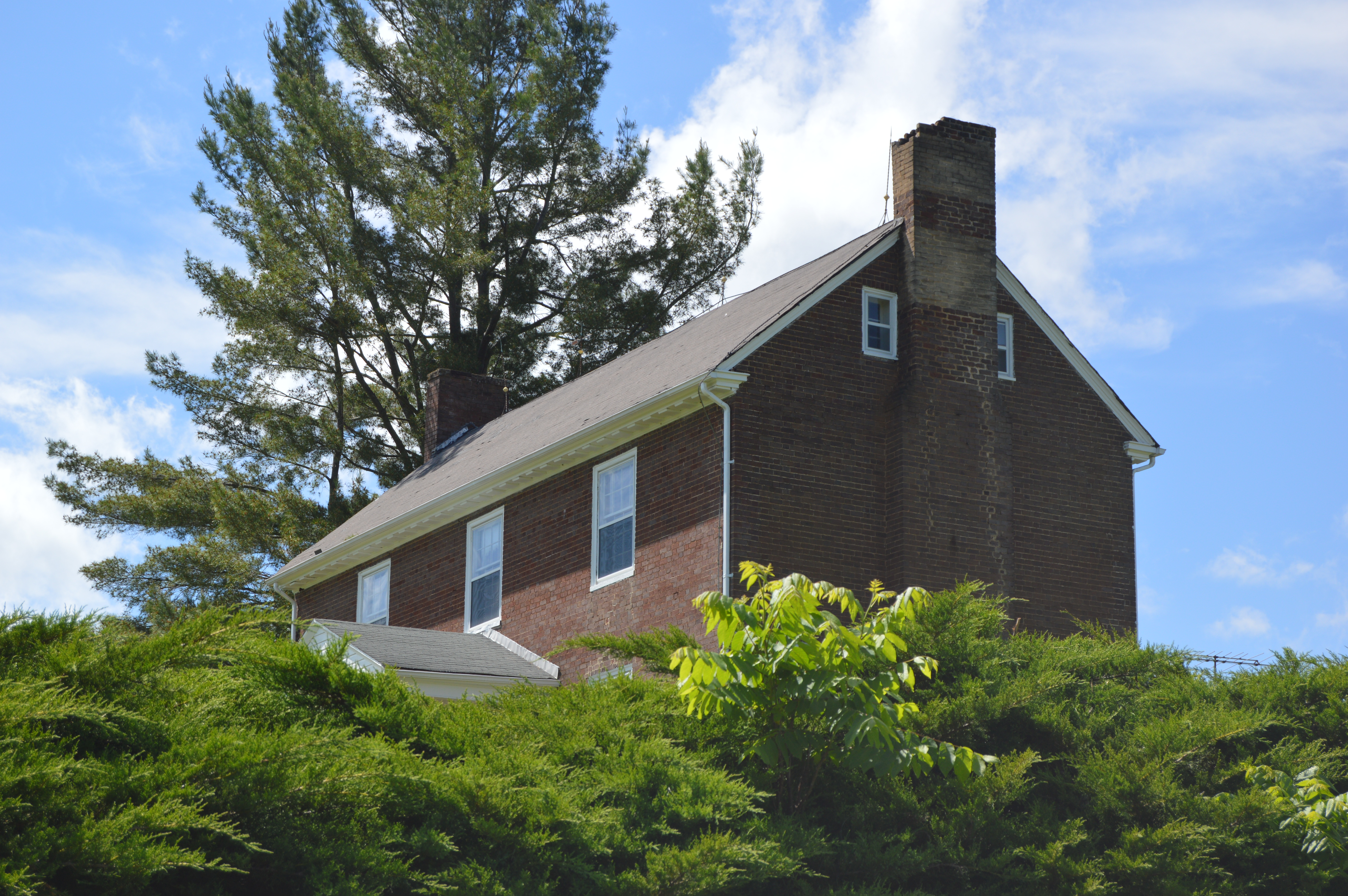
- Rear and eastern side

- Location within Virginia Location within the United States
- Location: 0.75 mi. N of jct. of VA 717 and VA 890, near Snow Creek, Virginia
- Coordinates: 36°50′05″N 79°47′54″W
- Area: 114 acres (46 ha)
- Built: 1838-1839
- Built by: Mountjoy & Ligon
- Architectural style: Federal, Greek Revival
- NRHP reference No.: 97000484
- VLR No.: 033-0179

Significant dates
- Added to NRHP: May 23, 1997
- Designated VLR: March 19, 1997

Finney–Lee House is a historic home near Snow Creek, Franklin County, Virginia. It was built in 1838–1839 and is a two-story, three-bay brick dwelling. It has a gable roof and exterior end chimneys. The interior features Federal and Greek Revival design details. Also on the property are the contributing front walkway, pack house (c. 1930), two tobacco barns (c. 1900), a cemetery, and a road trace.

It was listed on the National Register of Historic Places in 1997.
