= Michael Flaherty =

Michael Flaherty may refer to:

- Michael F. Flaherty (born 1969), American politician
- Michael F. Flaherty Sr. (born 1936), American former judge and politician
- Michael J. Flaherty (1862–1921), American politician
- Michael John Flaherty (1917–1992), Irish hurler
- Michael Patrick Flaherty, a character on the sitcom Spin City, played by Michael J. Fox

== See also ==
- Micheal Flaherty (educator), maker of educational films
- Michael O'Flaherty (disambiguation)
