= Joseph J. Costello =

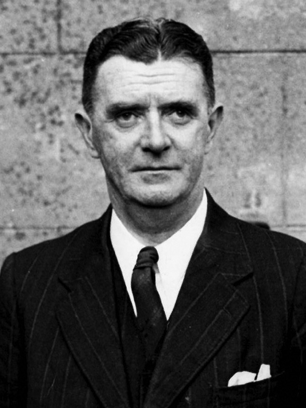
- Costello in 1944

Mayor of Galway
- In office 1937–1950
- Preceded by: Office re-established
- Succeeded by: Michael O'Flaherty

Personal details
- Born: Galway, Ireland

Joseph J. Costello (1892–1960) was the longest serving Mayor of Galway.

== Politics ==
Costello first entered public life when elected to the Galway Urban Council in 1924.

Costello was elected as mayor in December 1937, becoming the first mayor of Galway in nearly 100 years. The last mayor, prior to Costello's tenure, was Edmond Blake, who held office until 1841 when the position was dissolved. The mayoralty was reintroduced in 1937, following the abolition of Galway Urban Council.

Costello was the town's longest serving mayor, and his term of office lasted from December 1937 until September 1950. During this time, he granted the Freedom of Galway to Douglas Hyde and Éamon de Valera, set up the 'Mayor's Fuel Fund' to help address fuel poverty, and oversaw the return of the body of William Butler Yeats in 1949.

== Personal life ==
A native of Galway, Costello was a chemist by profession. He was married and had three children. He is buried in New Cemetery, Bohermore.

== Sources ==
- Henry, William (2002). Role of Honour: The Mayors of Galway City 1485-2001. Galway: Galway City Council. OCLC 51023721 ASIN B003NECRYW

Civic offices
New office re-created Previous mayor: Edmond Blake, 1836–1840	Mayor of Galway; 1937–1950	Succeeded by Michael O'Flaherty
