= Joseph A. Flaherty Jr. =

American media executive (1930–2018)

- Born: December 25, 1930
- Died: August 7, 2018 (aged 87)
- Occupations: Senior Vice President, Inventor and Co-inventor of television technologies

Joseph Antony Flaherty, Jr. (December 25, 1930 – August 7, 2018) was the Senior Vice President for Technology at CBS. He is the inventor and co-inventor of many television technologies including the miniature color camera, and off-line videotape editing, and co-inventor to Raymond D. Schneider of Electronic news-gathering. Flaherty was Chairman of the Planning Subcommittee of the U.S. Federal Communications Commission's (FCC) Advisory Committee on Advanced Television Service that developed the ATSC HDTV standard.

== Biography ==
Joseph A. Flaherty, Jr. is the son of a television engineer. He earned a degree in physics from Rockhurst College. From 1953 to 1955, Flaherty served at the United States Army Signal Corps Photographic Center. As Technical Director and Design Engineer of the U.S. Army's first television station, Flaherty designed the studio wherein training films were made through kinescope. Flaherty's career at CBS began in 1957 when he joined as a Design Engineer. Flaherty moved up in the ranks due to his innovations, and in 1977 he became Vice President for Technology.

At CBS, he played an integral role in the development of such technologies as Electronic news-gathering, the miniature color camera, one inch videotape, off-line videotape editing, and high definition television. High definition television was one of Flaherty's chief areas of interest; he presented many papers on the subject. Flaherty served as Chairman of the Planning Subcommittee of the FCC's Advisory Committee on Advanced Television Service that developed the ATSC HDTV standard.

Flaherty has also served as a Director of the Arthur C. Clarke Foundation. He was a fan of Clarke's work and has referenced the science fiction author in speeches.

Joe Flaherty died on August 7, 2018, at the age of 87.

== Honors and awards received ==
- Society of Motion Picture and Television Engineers David Sarnoff Gold Medal (1974)
- Emmy for development of Electronic News Gathering (1975)
- National Association of Broadcasters Engineering Award (1983)
- Chevalier de l'Ordre National de la Légion d'honneur (1985)
- Emmy for electronic editing systems for programs produced on film (1986)
- Chevalier de l'Ordre des Arts et des Lettres (1989)
- Emmy for the first Digital Computer Automation System for television (1989)
- Member of the Broadcasting and Cable Magazine Hall of Fame (1991)
- Personal Achievement Emmy for Lifetime Achievement in Contributions to the Development and Improvement of the Science and Technology of Television (1994)
- Charles F. Jenkins Lifetime Achievement Award (1996)
