= Curly pine =

Type of wood

Curly pine is the wood of a pine tree with a wavy pattern. It is highly sought after for woodworking and furniture-making. The erratic whorled pattern, which is proximately caused by abnormal growth, generally only occurs in old-growth trees.
