= USS Flaherty =

1943 Edsall-class destroyer escort

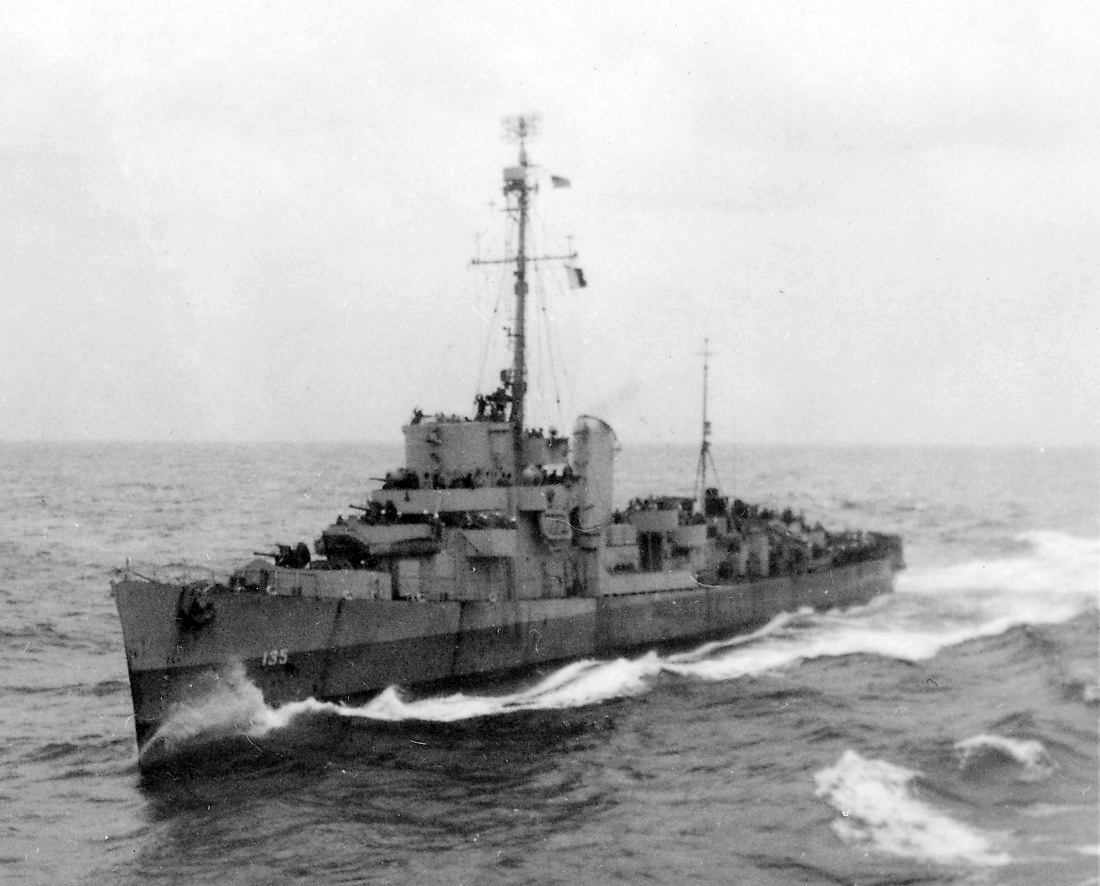

History

United States
- Namesake: Francis C. Flaherty
- Builder: Consolidated Steel Corporation, Orange, Texas
- Laid down: 7 November 1942
- Launched: 17 January 1943
- Commissioned: 26 June 1943
- Decommissioned: 17 June 1946
- Stricken: 1 April 1965
- Honours and awards: 4 battle stars plus a Presidential Unit Citation
- Fate: Sold 4 November 1966, scrapped

General characteristics
- Class & type: Edsall-class destroyer escort
- Displacement: 1,253 tons standard; 1,590 tons full load
- Length: 306 feet (93.27 m)
- Beam: 36.58 feet (11.15 m)
- Draft: 10.42 full load feet (3.18 m)
- Propulsion: 4 FM diesel engines, 4 diesel-generators, 6,000 shp (4.5 MW), 2 screws
- Speed: 21 knots (39 km/h)
- Range: 9,100 nmi. at 12 knots; (17,000 km at 22 km/h)
- Complement: 8 officers, 201 enlisted
- Armament: 3 × single 3 in (76 mm)/50 guns; 1 × twin 40 mm AA guns; 8 × single 20 mm AA guns; 1 × triple 21 in (533 mm) torpedo tubes; 8 × depth charge projectors; 1 × depth charge projector (hedgehog); 2 × depth charge tracks

USS Flaherty (DE-135) was an Edsall-class destroyer escort in service with the United States Navy from 1943 to 1946. She was sold for scrap in 1966.

== History ==
The ship was named in honor of Francis Charles Flaherty, who was awarded the Medal of Honor when he sacrificed his life in the Japanese attack on Pearl Harbor 7 December 1941. When his ship was being abandoned, he remained in a turret holding a flashlight so that all of his men could see their way in order to escape; however, Flaherty did not make it out.

Flaherty was launched 17 January 1943 by Consolidated Steel Corp., Orange, Texas; sponsored by Mrs. J. J. Flaherty, sister-in-law of Ensign Flaherty; and commissioned 26 June 1943.

=== Battle of the Atlantic ===
Between 4 September 1943 and 15 February 1944, Flaherty made three voyages from the east coast to Casablanca on convoy escort duty. At Norfolk on 7 March 1944, she joined the hunter-killer group formed around USS Guadalcanal, sailing for a patrol which took her group across to Casablanca. On the return passage, off Madeira on 9 April, Flaherty fired in the action which sank U-515, for which she shared in the credit with three other escorts and carrier aircraft.

==== Capture of U-505 ====
Returning to New York 27 April 1944, Flaherty rejoined the Guadalcanal group at Norfolk, Virginia, 10 May, and 5 days later sailed on a patrol which was to win the task group a Presidential Unit Citation. On 4 June, in a well-planned and executed operation, her group captured intact German submarine U-505. The only capture by American forces of a German submarine on the high seas during the war, this dramatic operation provided essential intelligence for future antisubmarine warfare. Flaherty's role during the action was close screening for Guadalcanal, from which the attack and seizure were directed. She returned to New York from this patrol 22 June.

==== Sinking of U-546 ====
Between 15 July 1944 and 7 November, Flaherty completed two more hunter-killer patrols with the Guadalcanal group, then served as school ship for the Naval Training Center at Miami, Florida. Training in the Caribbean with carriers followed, until she sailed from Naval Station Mayport, 9 April for Argentia, Newfoundland. This was her base for duty on the barrier line established in the last months of the European phase of the war to prevent desperate U-boats from penetrating the western Atlantic. On 24 April, USS Frederick C. Davis was torpedoed while investigating a submarine contact, and Flaherty dashed to rescue her survivors. After three men had been taken on board, Flaherty picked the submarine up by sonar, and moved in to attack. Seven other escorts joined her in the 10-hour hunt, which resulted in forcing German submarine U-546 to the surface, where she was sunk by gunfire. She recovered five of the U-boat's survivors, including the commanding officer.

Flaherty returned to New York 11 May 1945, and 2 weeks later sailed on convoy escort duty to Le Havre, France, and Southampton, England. She returned to duty guarding carriers training off Norfolk and Charleston, South Carolina, until arriving at Green Cove Springs, Florida, 12 January 1946.

=== Decommissioning and fate ===
There she was decommissioned and placed in reserve 17 June 1946. She was struck from the Navy list on 1 April 1965 and sold for scrap on 4 November 1966.

== Awards ==
In addition to the Presidential Unit Citation, Flaherty received four battle stars for World War II service.
