= John Flaherty (disambiguation) =

John Flaherty (born 1967) is an American baseball commentator.

John Flaherty may also refer to:

- John Flaherty (cricketer) (1942–2026), New Zealand cricketer
- John P. Flaherty Jr., Supreme Court of Pennsylvania judge
- Johnny Flaherty (1947–2023), Irish hurler
- Jack Flaherty (gymnast) (1908–1980), British Olympic gymnast
- Jack Flaherty (politician) (1933–2025), Canadian politician

== See also ==
- Jack Flaherty (born 1995), American baseball pitcher
- John O'Flaherty (disambiguation)
