= Pat Flaherty =

Pat Flaherty may refer to:

- Pat Flaherty (racing driver) (1926–2002), American racecar driver
- Pat Flaherty (actor) (1897–1970), American actor
- Pat Flaherty (American football) (born 1956), American football coach
- Pat Flaherty (baseball) (1866–1946), Major League Baseball third baseman
- Pat Flaherty (politician) (1923–2013), Australian politician

== See also ==
- Patsy Flaherty (Patrick Flaherty, 1876–1968), American Major League Baseball pitcher
- Michael Patrick Flaherty, main character in the sitcom Spin City
