= Michael O'Flaherty (politician) =

Michael O'Flaherty (1891 – 19 September 1952) was Mayor of Galway, Ireland from September 1950 to 19 September 1952.

Born in Galway City in 1891 to a family from Carraroe, Connemara, his parents were Patrick Flaherty and Catherine Clancy. O'Flaherty was one of six children, among whom was Fr. Colman O'Flaherty, who was killed in action by enemy shellfire near Véry, France, while serving as a military chaplain in the 1st Infantry Division, American Expeditionary Force during World War I and posthumously awarded the Distinguished Service Cross. Another brother, Patrick O'Flaherty, died during the Irish War of Independence.

Upon graduating from St. Joseph's College he joined the editorial staff at the Connacht Tribune. He married Agnes Staunton of Kilcolgan in 1922 and had six children: Patrick (later a Mayor), Michael, Colm, Kathleen, Eva and Tina. He was a pioneer of the bus transport system in the west of Ireland, obtained contracts for mail routes prior to 1923, ran a cinema and O'Flaherty's Motors Limited.

O'Flaherty was one of the longest-serving public representatives i the town, beginning in 1924 till his death on 19 September 1959. He was the last chairman of the old Urban District Council and was a prime mover in the restoration of the Mayoralty in 1937. During his first term as Mayor, he awarded the Freedom of the city to Irish president Seán T. O'Kelly.

Civic offices
Preceded by Joseph J. Costello	Mayor of Galway; 1950–1952	Succeeded by Michael Lydon
