= John O'Flaherty House =

- U.S. National Register of Historic Places
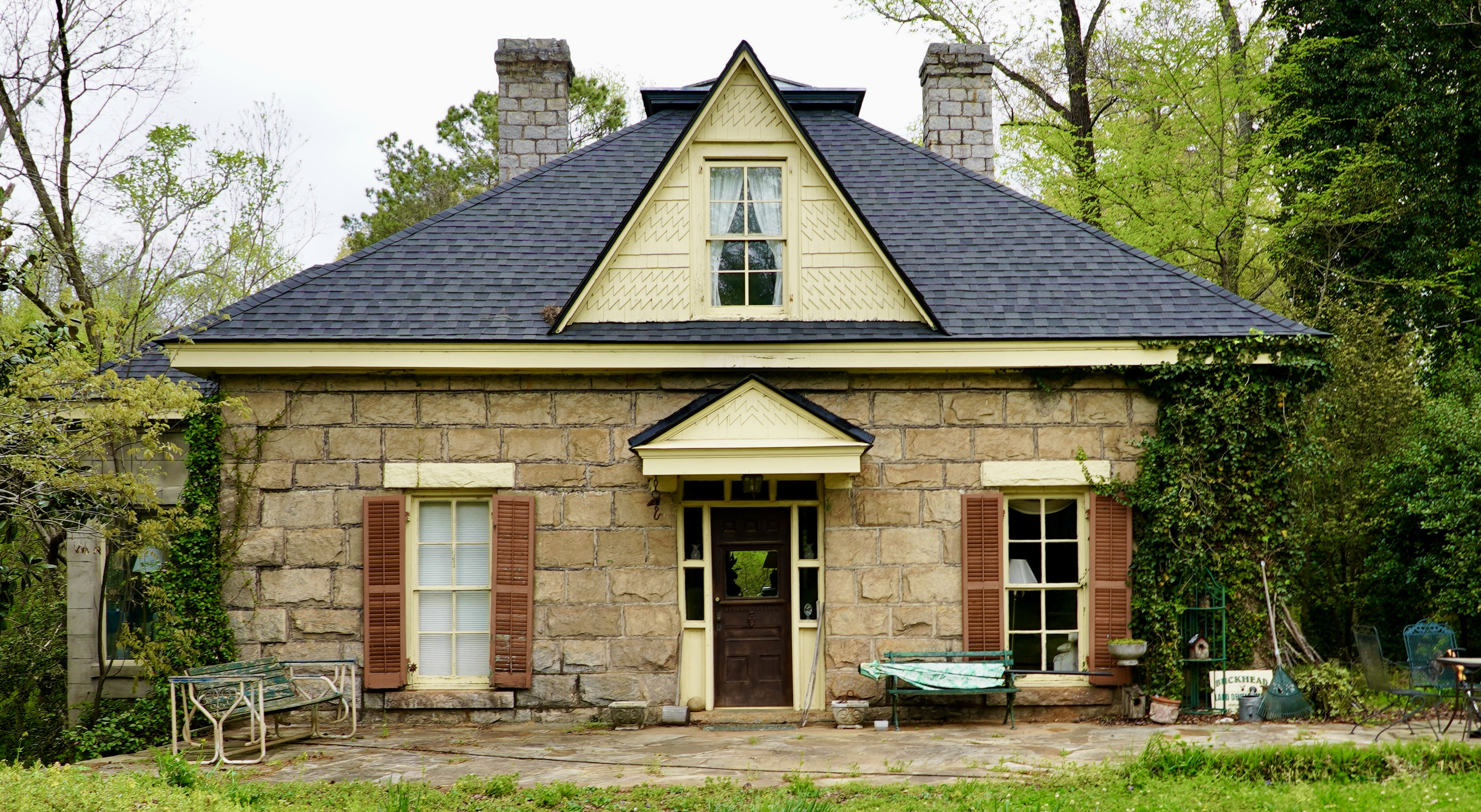

- Location within Georgia
- Location: 1000 Oconee Rd., Buckhead, Morgan County, Georgia
- Coordinates: 33°34′07″N 83°21′35″W
- Area: 2 acres (0.81 ha)
- Built: 1896
- Architectural style: Georgian cottage
- NRHP reference No.: 91001155
- Added to NRHP: August 29, 1991

The John O'Flaherty House, also known as The Rock House, at 1000 Oconee Road in Buckhead, Morgan County, Georgia, was built in 1896. It was listed on the National Register of Historic Places in 1991.

It is a Georgian cottage in style. The house is unusual for its building materials. It is built of granite blocks, while most houses in Georgia were either wood frame or brick. Its inside is lined with curly pine.

The listing included a second contributing building and a contributing site as well.
