= Justice Flaherty =

Justice Flaherty may refer to:

- Francis Flaherty (judge) (born 1947), associate justice of the Rhode Island Supreme Court
- John P. Flaherty Jr. (1931–2019), associate justice of the Supreme Court of Pennsylvania
