= Baggot Street =

Street in central Dublin, Ireland

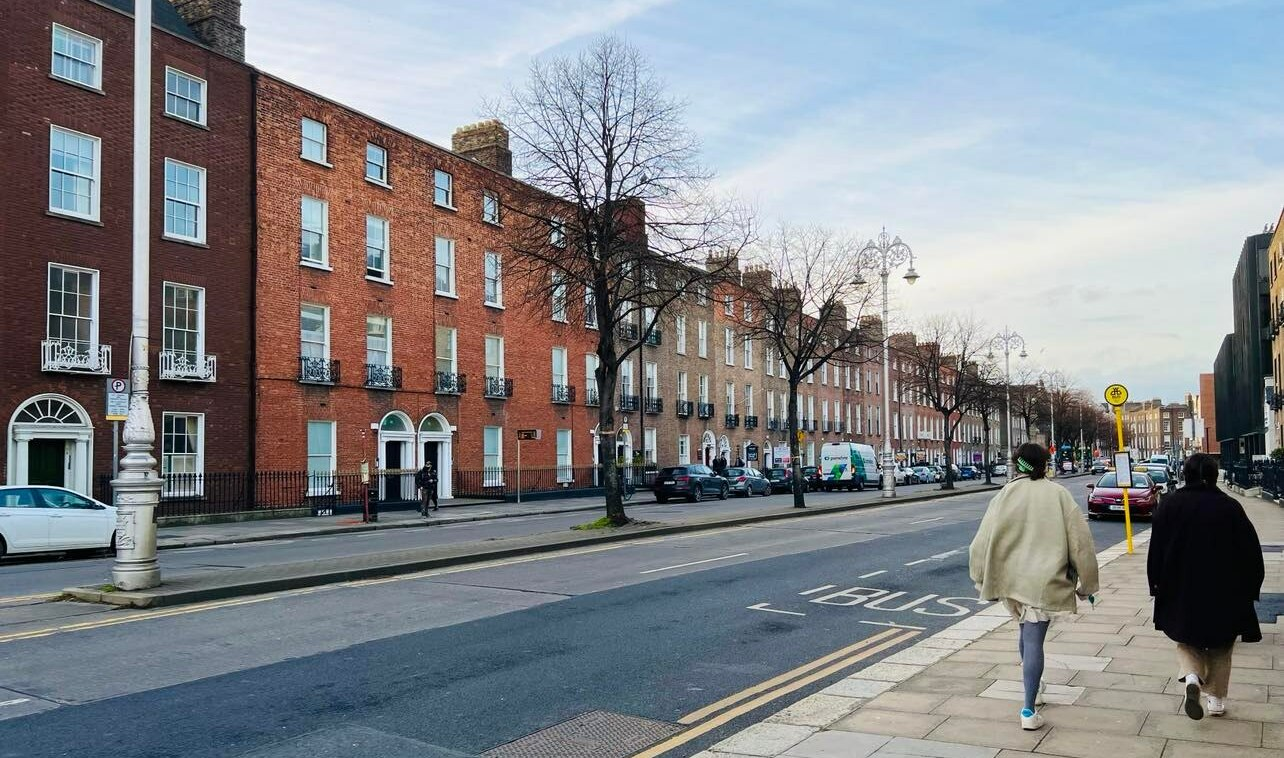
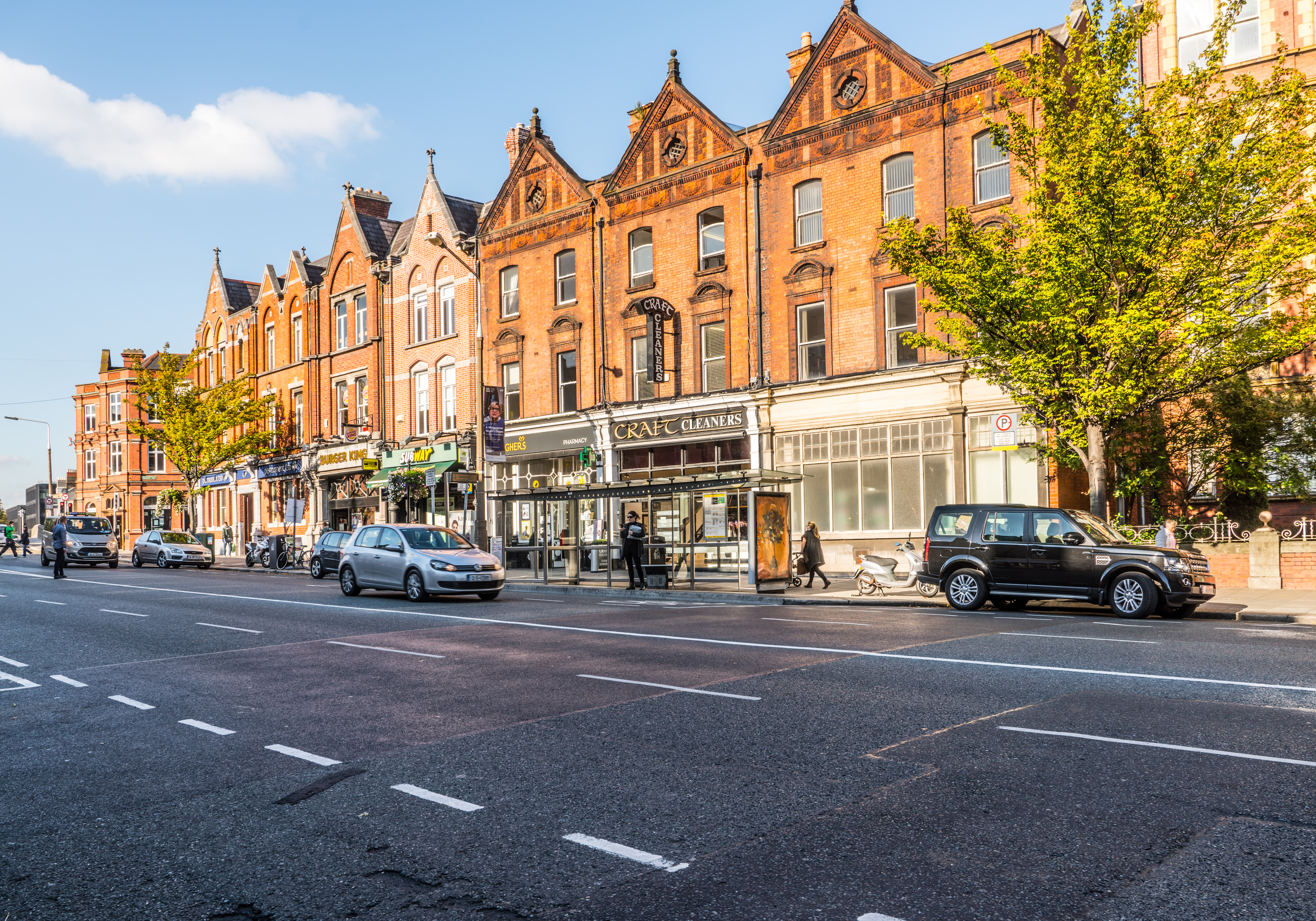
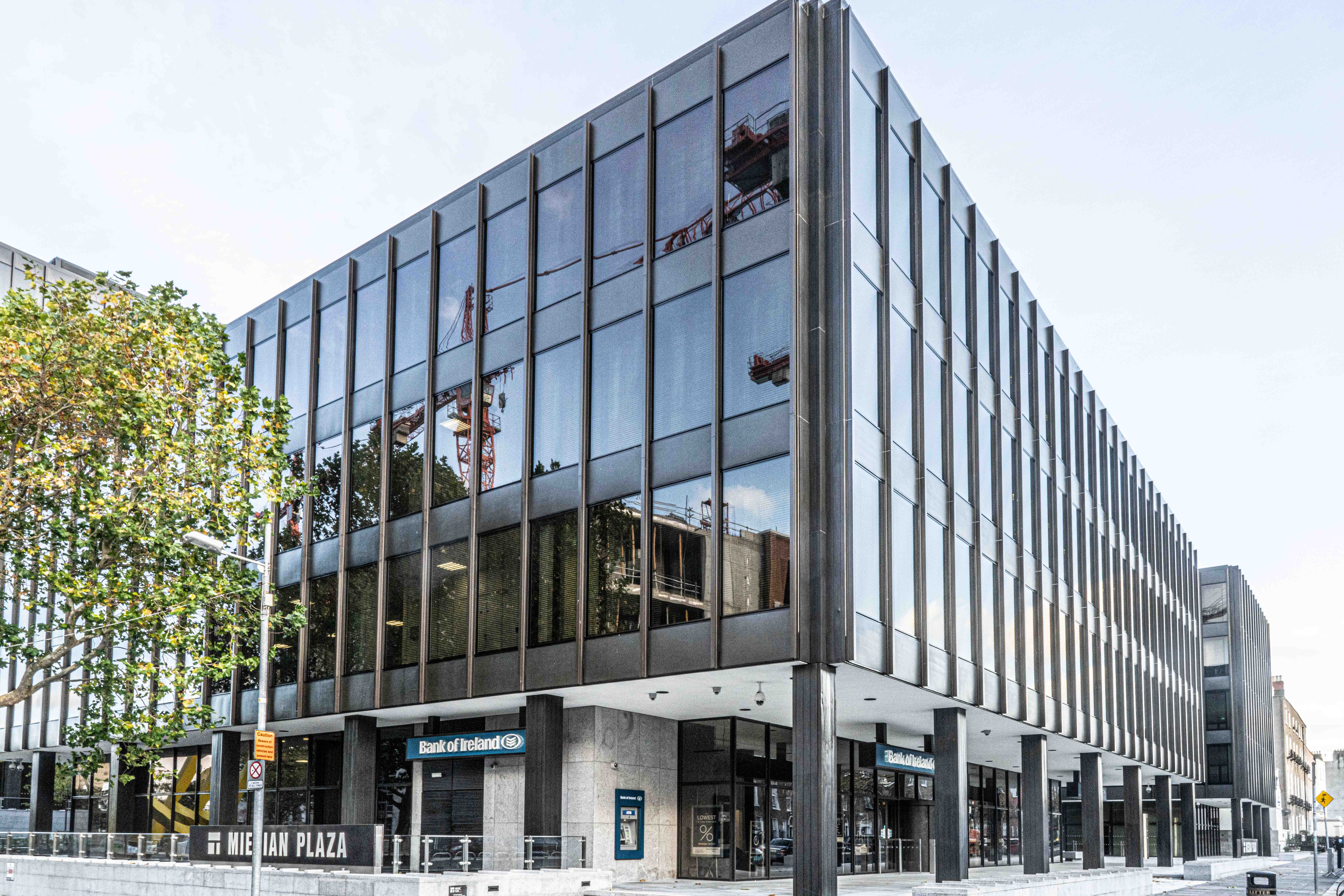
- Clockwise from top: Lower Baggot Street; Miesian Plaza; Upper Baggot Street

- Location within Central Dublin
- Native name: Sráid Bhagóid (Irish)
- Namesake: Baggotrath, named in turn after Robert Bagod
- Length: 700 m (2,300 ft)
- Width: 27 m (89 ft)
- Postal code: D02
- Coordinates: 53°19′59″N 06°14′34″W
- Northwest end: Merrion Street, Ely Place, Merrion Row
- Southeast end: Grand Canal, Herbert Place, Wilton Terrace

Other
- Known for: Georgian architecture, Victorian architecture

Baggot Street (Irish: Sráid Bhagóid) is a street in Dublin, Ireland. The street runs from Merrion Row (near St. Stephen's Green) to the northwestern end of Pembroke Road. It crosses the Grand Canal near Haddington Road. It is divided into two sections:

- Lower Baggot Street (Irish: Sráid Bhagóid Íochtarach) - between Merrion Row and the Grand Canal. It was called Gallows Road in the 18th century.
- Upper Baggot Street (Irish: Sráid Bhagóid Uachtarach) - south of the Grand Canal to the junction with Eastmoreland Place, where it continues as Pembroke Road.

== History ==
Baggot Street is named after Baggotrath, a feudal manor granted to Hiberno-Norman judge Robert Bagod in the 13th century. He also built Baggotrath Castle, which was partly destroyed during the 1649 Battle of Rathmines and demolished in the early nineteenth century.

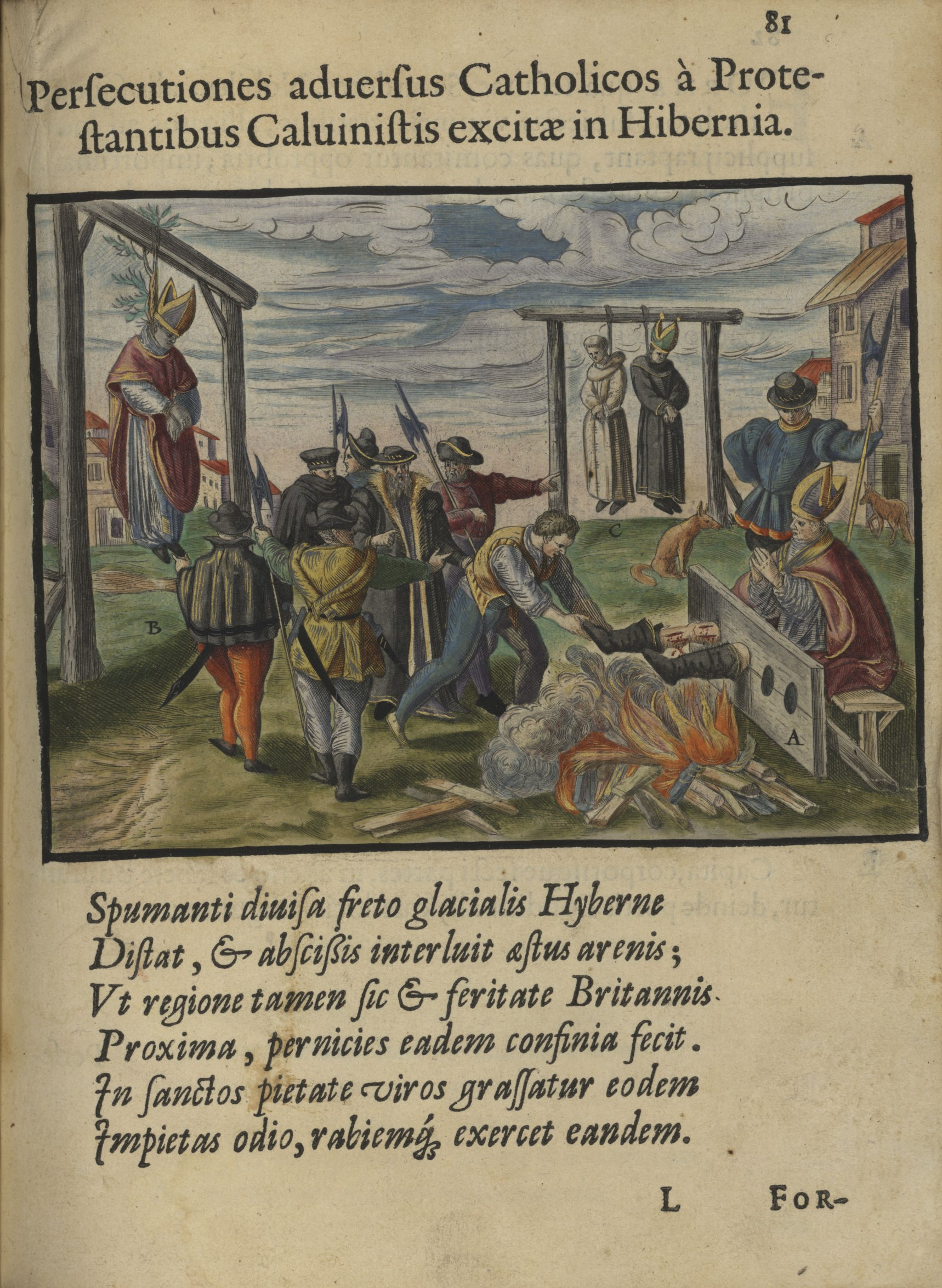
Richard Verstegen's depiction of the 1584 torture and execution of Archbishop Dermot O'Hurley. The 1579 hanging of fellow Irish Catholic Martyrs Bishop Patrick O'Hely and Friar Conn Ó Ruairc is shown in the background.

Dermot O'Hurley, Archbishop of Cashel for the strictly illegal and underground Catholic Church in Ireland during the reign of Queen Elizabeth I, was hanged at Gallows Road (near the modern juncture of Lower Baggot Street and Fitzwilliam Street) on 20 June 1584. The Archbishop was beatified as one of the 24 officially recognized Irish Catholic Martyrs by Pope John Paul II on 29 September 1992.

On a 1756 map of Dublin, Baggot Street is marked as The Road to Ball's-Bridge, and in 1800 Baggot Street Upper was marked as Blackrock Road.

Darkey Kelly, a madam, or kip-house keeper, and alleged female serial killer, was executed by burning on Gallows Road (modern Baggot Street) in 1761.

The street was renamed Baggot Street in 1773.

In 1835, the Episcopal Chapel and Asylum for Penitent Females opened on the street.

The area's status as a cultural hotbed in the mid to late 20th century led to it being referred to as "Baggotonia".

== Architecture ==
Lower Baggot Street is distinguished by Georgian architecture, while Upper Baggot Street has mainly Victorian architecture with a few buildings of 20th-century vintage such as the former Bank of Ireland headquarters, Miesian Plaza. The Royal City of Dublin Hospital, opened in 1834, is on the east side of Upper Baggot Street, just south of the junction with Haddington Road. Cook's Map of 1836 shows the north side of Upper Baggot Street and Pembroke Road almost entirely built on.

Modern development such as the Miesian Plaza has been viewed by some as destructive to a previously unified Georgian streetscape. Journalist Frank MacDonald characterised the Plaza as a more violent interjection on the street than the contemporaneous ESB building on Fitzwilliam Street. On 13 July 1973, two nurses escaped from their flat in number 11 Lower Baggot Street when the back and side walls of the house collapsed following the demolition of three adjoining houses to make way for an office block. The 1978 offices built for Bórd na Móna, near the Miesian Plaza, were designed by Sam Stephenson, and won the Buildings in Context award from An Taisce.

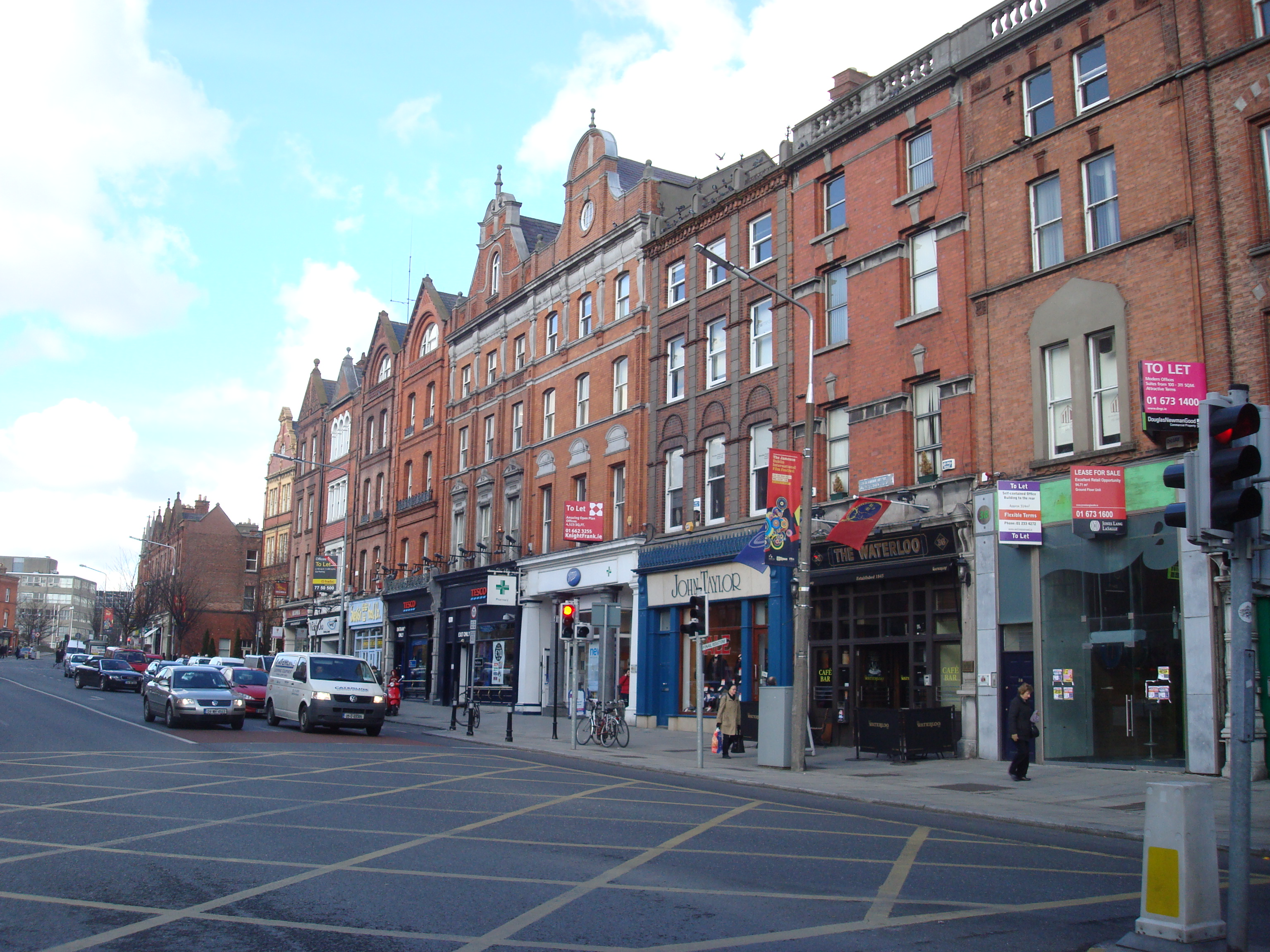
Upper Baggot Street

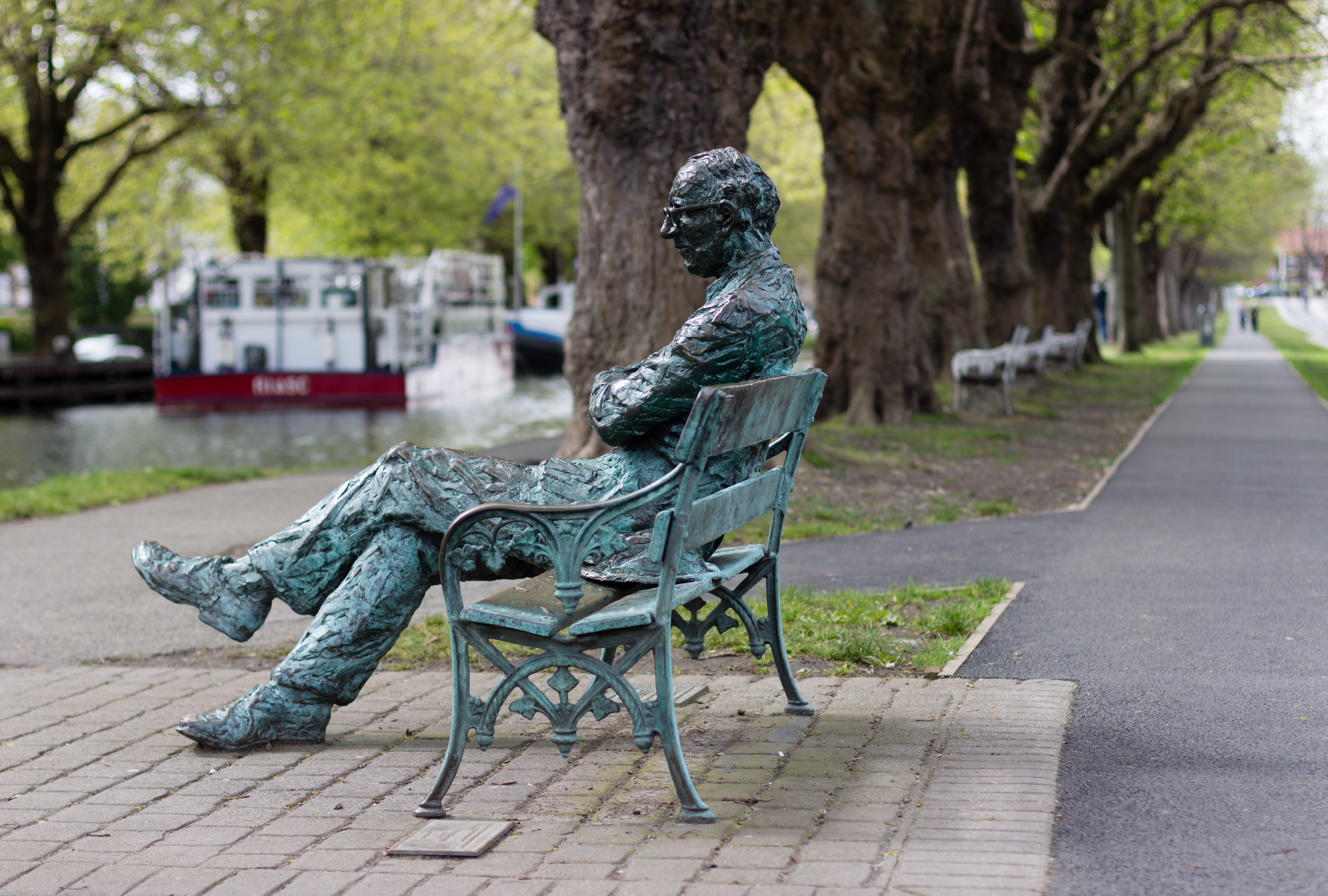
Patrick Kavanagh sculpture by the Grand Canal near Baggot Street bridge

== People ==
- The Sheares Brothers, members of the Society of United Irishmen, who died in the 1798 rebellion, lived at no. 128.
- In 1830, Thomas Davis, the revolutionary Irish writer who was the chief organiser and poet of the Young Ireland movement, lived at 67 Lower Baggot Street.
- Catherine McAuley, a nun, founded the Sisters of Mercy order in 1831 and built what is now the Mercy International Centre on Lower Baggot Street, where she later died in 1841.
- In 1909, Francis Bacon was born at 63 Lower Baggot Street.
- May O'Flaherty, County Cork-born literary patron was the proprietor of Parsons Bookshop on Baggot Street Bridge from 1949 to 1989.
- The poet Patrick Kavanagh frequented Baggot Street, (including Parsons) and regarded it as his favourite place in Dublin.
  - In his poem "If ever you go to Dublin Town" Kavanagh addresses Dubliners 100 years after his own time and tells them to "Inquire for me in Baggot Street/And what I was like to know".
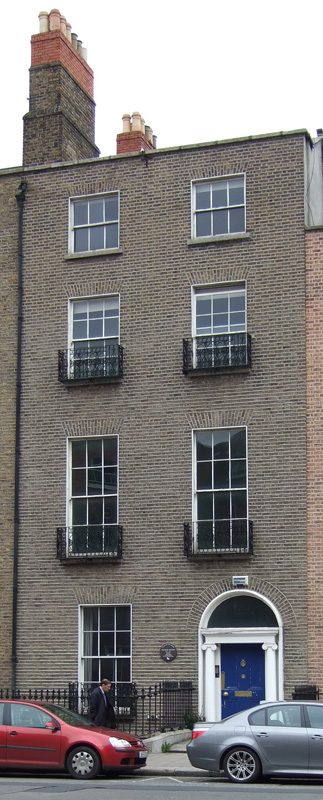
Francis Bacon's birthplace at 63 Baggot Street Dublin

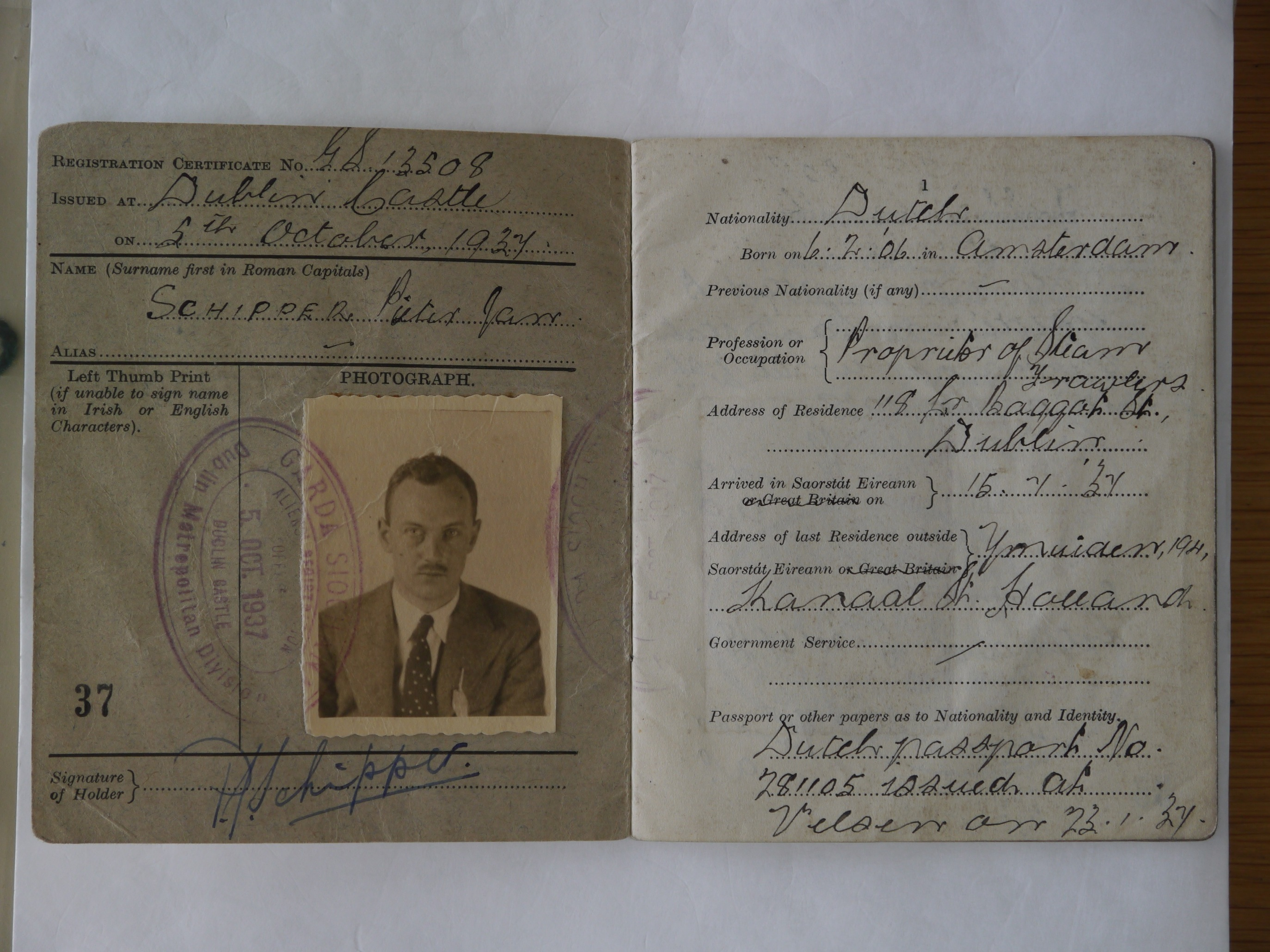
Pieter Jan Schippers, V-person during World War II was registered Lower Baggot Street 118

== See also ==
- List of streets and squares in Dublin
