= Wilson–Finney–Land House =

- U.S. National Register of Historic Places
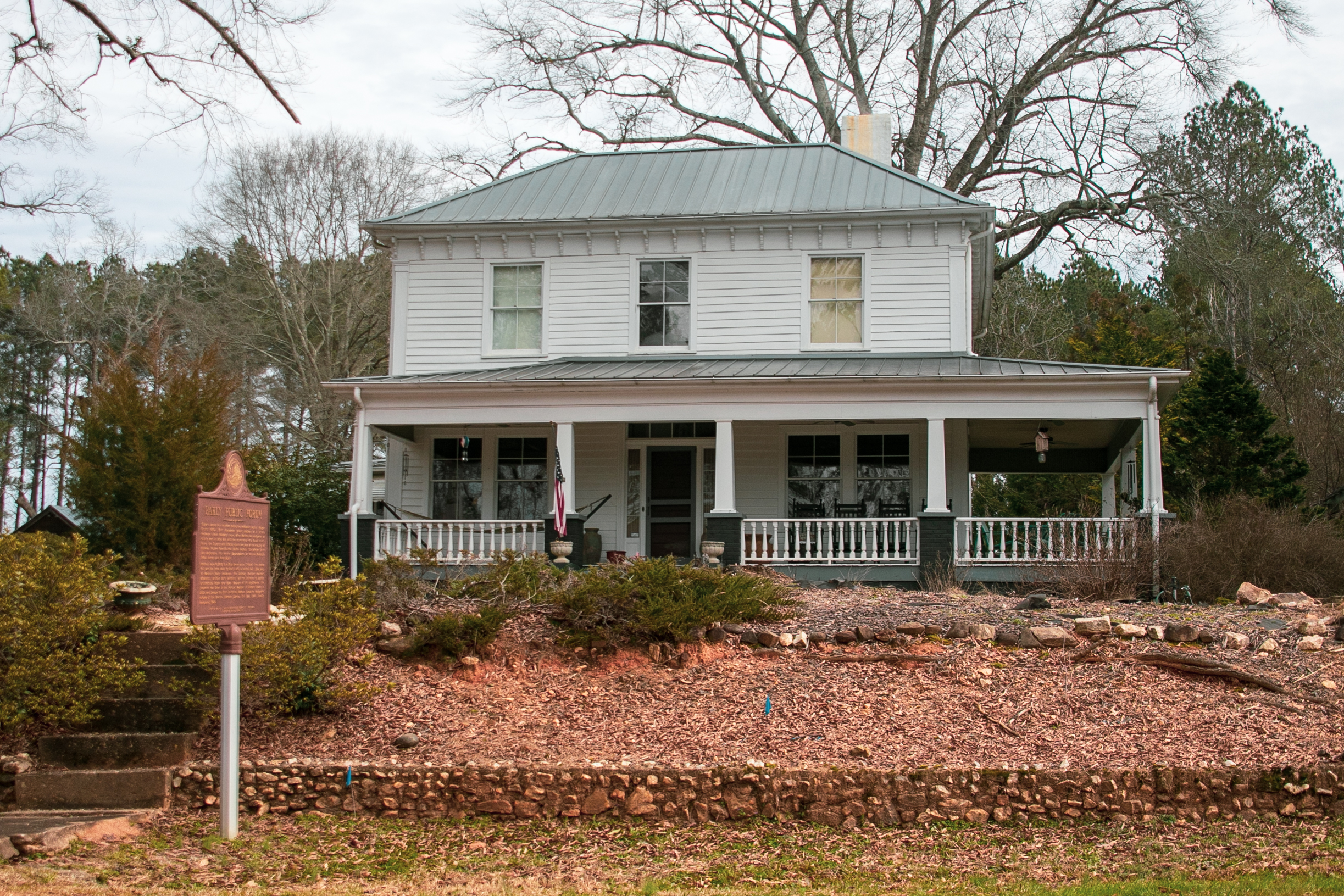

- Location within Georgia
- Nearest city: Madison, Georgia
- Coordinates: 33°34′38″N 83°27′13″W
- Area: 2 acres (0.81 ha)
- Built: 1805
- Built by: James Wilson
- Architectural style: Greek Revival, Italianate, Craftsman
- NRHP reference No.: 04000021
- Added to NRHP: February 11, 2004

The Wilson–Finney–Land House, at 1750 Bethany Rd. in Morgan County, Georgia near Madison, Georgia, was built in 1805. It was listed on the National Register of Historic Places in 2004.

It was the main house of cotton plantation having more than 3,500 acres (14 km^{2}). The listing also includes a garage and several contributing objects.

The main house was built as an I-house by James Wilson around 1805. It was later owned and lived in by Abraham McAfee, who was a captain in the local militia and was the second sheriff of Morgan County. A later owner named James Finney added Greek Revival and Italianate features to the house, including the front door surround and decorative brackets supporting the eaves. A later owner, Cincinnatus Land, added Craftsman details, including a wraparound porch with square columns on brick piers.

It was deemed "significant in the area of architecture as an excellent example of a house that has evolved over time to meet the needs of its occupants and the changing architectural styles."
