= Thomas Flaherty =

Tom or Thomas Flaherty may refer to:

- Thomas E. Flaherty (born 1950), Pennsylvania politician
- Thomas A. Flaherty (1898–1965), Massachusetts politician
- Tom Flaherty (born c. 1824), American criminal, sneak thief and river pirate
- Thomas J. Flaherty (born 1963), Irish Garda officer
- Thomas Flaherty (musician), American cellist, composer, and musicologist
- Tom Flaherty (American football) (born 1964), American football player
