= Francis C. Flaherty =

US Navy Medal of Honor recipient (1919–1941)

Francis Charles Flaherty
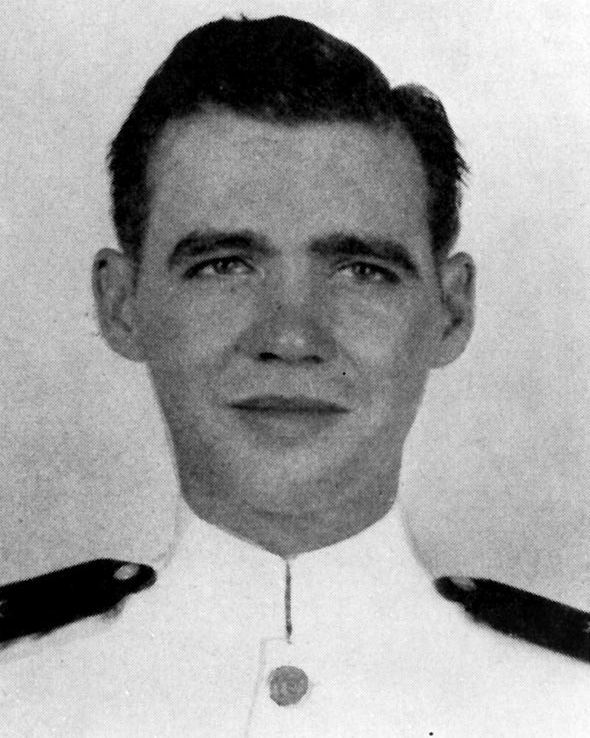
- Ensign Francis C. Flaherty
- Born: March 15, 1919; Charlotte, Michigan, US
- Died: December 7, 1941 (aged 22); Pearl Harbor, Territory of Hawaii
- Burial place: initially the USS Oklahoma, Pearl Harbor, Hawaii * later reinterred to the National Memorial Cemetery of the Pacific in Honolulu, Hawaii, then Charlotte, Michigan, September 2021
- Military career
- Allegiance: United States
- Branch: United States Naval Reserve
- Service years: 1940–1941
- Rank: Ensign
- Unit: USS Oklahoma (BB-37)
- Conflicts: World War II; *Attack on Pearl Harbor
- Awards: Medal of Honor

Francis Charles Flaherty (March 15, 1919 – December 7, 1941) was an officer in the United States Naval Reserve and a recipient of America's highest military decoration — the Medal of Honor. He was awarded the Medal of Honor for helping his crewmates escape the sinking USS Oklahoma (BB-37) at the expense of his own life, during the Japanese attack on Pearl Harbor.

== Biography ==
Flaherty's grave at Maple Hill Cemetery

Francis Flaherty was born on March 15, 1919, in Charlotte, Michigan. He was a parishioner at St. Mary's Catholic Church while living in Charlotte. Flaherty attended Charlotte High School, graduating in 1936, and enrolled at the University of Michigan. He enlisted in the Naval Reserve shortly after graduating from Michigan in July 1940 and was commissioned as an Ensign in December of that year.

At the time of the attack on Pearl Harbor, Flaherty was serving on board the USS Oklahoma. The Oklahoma was based at Pearl Harbor for patrols and exercises, and was moored in Battleship Row when the attack began. Almost immediately after the first Japanese bombs fell, the ship was hit by three torpedoes and began to capsize. Those who could began to abandon ship as more torpedoes struck home. Ensign Flaherty remained in one of the ship's turrets, providing light so that the turret crew could escape. When the Oklahoma rolled completely over, he was trapped inside the hull along with many others. Thirty-two crewmembers of the Oklahoma were rescued from inside the hull over the next few days, but Ensign Flaherty was not among them.

Overall, 429 men were entombed in the Oklahoma at Pearl Harbor, including Flaherty. The ship was raised for salvage in 1943, and the remains inside were eventually interred in mass graves marked "Unknowns" at the National Memorial Cemetery of the Pacific in Honolulu, Hawaii. Flaherty's name is inscribed in the Courts of the Missing at the National Memorial Cemetery of the Pacific, and a memorial headstone was placed in Maple Hill Cemetery in his hometown of Charlotte, Michigan.

On November 1, 2019, the Defense POW/MIA Accounting Agency announced they had identified Ensign Flaherty's remains.

== Awards and honors ==

1st Row	Medal of Honor		
2nd Row	Purple Heart	Combat Action Ribbon	American Defense Service Medal with Fleet clasp
3rd Row	American Campaign Medal	Asiatic-Pacific Campaign Medal with 1 campaign star	World War II Victory Medal

=== Medal of Honor citation ===
For conspicuous devotion to duty and extraordinary courage and complete disregard of his own life, above and beyond the call of duty, during the attack on the Fleet in Pearl Harbor, by Japanese forces on 7 December 1941. When it was seen that the U.S.S. Oklahoma was going to capsize and the order was given to abandon ship, Ens. Flaherty remained in a turret, holding a flashlight so the remainder of the turret crew could see to escape, thereby sacrificing his own life.

=== Namesakes ===
- The destroyer escort USS Flaherty (DE-135), commissioned in 1943 and decommissioned in 1946, was named in honor of Ensign Flaherty.
- American Legion Post 42 (Greenawalt-Flaherty) in Charlotte, Michigan is partially named after Ensign Flaherty.

== See also ==
- List of Medal of Honor recipients for World War II

== Sources ==
- "Ensign Francis C. Flaherty, USNR, (1919-1941)". US People. Naval Historical Center, Department of the Navy. December 30, 2000. Archived from the original on February 17, 2001.
- "USS Oklahoma". USS Arizona Memorial. National Park Service, Department of the Interior. February 4, 2005. Archived from the original on June 17, 2001.
