= Morgan County, Georgia =

County in Georgia, United States

- County
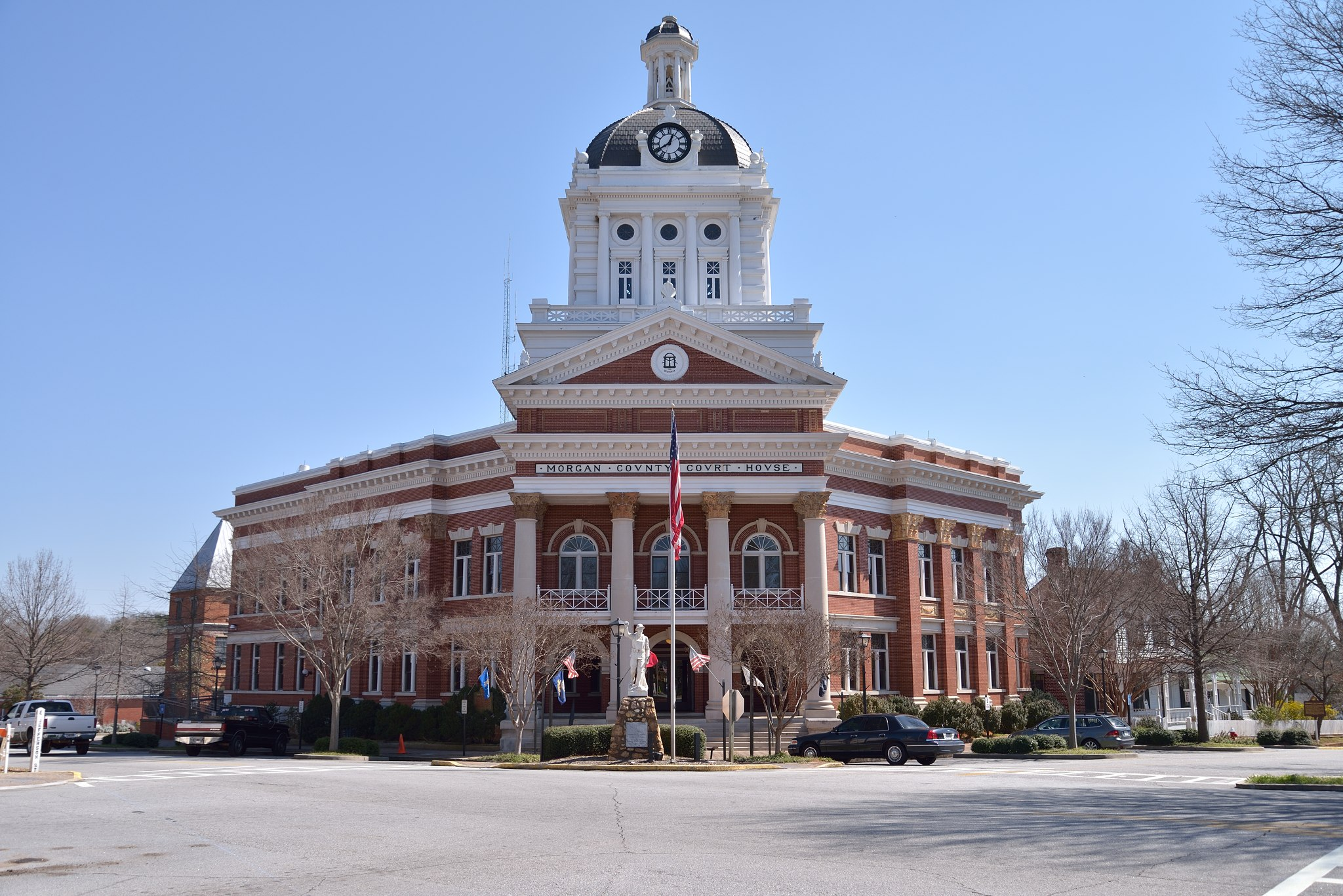
- Morgan County Courthouse in Madison

- Seal

- Location within the U.S. state of Georgia
- Coordinates: 33°35′N 83°29′W
- Country: United States
- State: Georgia
- Founded: December 10, 1807; 218 years ago
- Seat: Madison
- Largest city: Madison

Area
  - Total: 361 sq mi (930 km^{2})
  - Land: 345 sq mi (890 km^{2})
  - Water: 16 sq mi (41 km^{2}) 4.4%

Population (2020)
  - Total: 20,097
  - Estimate (2025): 22,095 ▲
  - Density: 58/sq mi (22/km^{2})
- Time zone: UTC−5 (Eastern)
  - Summer (DST): UTC−4 (EDT)
- Congressional district: 10th
- Website: morgancountyga.gov

Morgan County is a county located in the north central Piedmont region and the lake country region of the U.S. state of Georgia. As of the 2020 census, the population was 20,097. The county seat is Madison.

Since the early 21st century, the county has had a housing boom. It has proximity to Lake Oconee, a recreation site, as well as to major employment centers such as Atlanta, Athens, Augusta and Macon.

== History ==
Morgan County was created on December 10, 1807. It was named for renowned Revolutionary War commander Daniel Morgan. During the American Civil War, the county provided the Panola Guards, which was a part of Cobb's Legion.

== Geography ==
According to the U.S. Census Bureau, the county has a total area of 355 square miles (920 km^{2}), of which 347 square miles (900 km^{2}) is land and 7.3 square miles (19 km^{2}) (2.1%) is water. The entirety of Morgan County is located in the Upper Oconee River sub-basin of the Altamaha River basin.

=== Major highways ===
- I-20 / SR 402 – SR 402 is the unsigned designation for I-20
- US 129 / US 441 / SR 24
  - US 129 Byp. / US 441 Byp. / SR 24 Byp. (Madison)
- US 278 / SR 12
  - US 278 Truck / SR 12 Truck (Madison)
- SR 83
- SR 186

=== Adjacent counties ===
- Oconee County (north)
- Greene County (east)
- Putnam County (southeast)
- Jasper County (southwest)
- Newton County (west)
- Walton County (northwest)

=== National protected area ===
- Oconee National Forest (part)

== Communities ==
=== Cities ===
- Bostwick
- Madison (county seat)
- Rutledge

=== Town ===
- Buckhead

=== Census-designated place ===
- Godfrey

=== Unincorporated communities ===
- Apalachee
- Pennington

== Demographics ==
Historical population
Census	Pop.	Note	%±
1810	8,369		—
1820	13,520		61.5%
1830	12,046		−10.9%
1840	9,121		−24.3%
1850	10,744		17.8%
1860	9,997		−7.0%
1870	10,696		7.0%
1880	14,032		31.2%
1890	16,041		14.3%
1900	15,813		−1.4%
1910	19,717		24.7%
1920	20,143		2.2%
1930	12,488		−38.0%
1940	12,713		1.8%
1950	11,899		−6.4%
1960	10,280		−13.6%
1970	9,904		−3.7%
1980	11,572		16.8%
1990	12,883		11.3%
2000	15,457		20.0%
2010	17,868		15.6%
2020	20,097		12.5%
2025 (est.)	22,095	▲	9.9%
U.S. Decennial Census; 1790-1880 1890-1910; 1920-1930 1930-1940; 1940-1950 1960-1980; 1980-2000 2010

=== Racial and ethnic composition ===
Morgan County, Georgia – Racial and ethnic composition Note: the US Census treats Hispanic/Latino as an ethnic category. This table excludes Latinos from the racial categories and assigns them to a separate category. Hispanics/Latinos may be of any race.
Race / Ethnicity (NH = Non-Hispanic)	Pop 1980	Pop 1990	Pop 2000	Pop 2010	Pop 2020	% 1980	% 1990	% 2000	% 2010	% 2020
White alone (NH)	6,761	8,293	10,619	12,814	14,487	58.43%	64.37%	68.70%	71.71%	72.09%
Black or African American alone (NH)	4,689	4,436	4,385	4,199	4,105	40.52%	34.43%	28.37%	23.50%	20.43%
Native American or Alaska Native alone (NH)	9	11	21	45	42	0.08%	0.09%	0.14%	0.25%	0.21%
Asian alone (NH)	10	26	51	106	122	0.09%	0.20%	0.33%	0.59%	0.61%
Native Hawaiian or Pacific Islander alone (NH)	x	x	1	0	1	x	x	0.01%	0.00%	0.00%
Other race alone (NH)	0	0	12	17	68	0.00%	0.00%	0.08%	0.10%	0.34%
Mixed race or Multiracial (NH)	x	x	120	193	560	x	x	0.78%	1.08%	2.79%
Hispanic or Latino (any race)	103	117	248	494	712	0.89%	0.91%	1.60%	2.76%	3.54%
Total	11,572	12,883	15,457	17,868	20,097	100.00%	100.00%	100.00%	100.00%	100.00%

=== 2020 census ===
As of the 2020 census, the county had a population of 20,097. The median age was 43.1 years. 22.5% of residents were under the age of 18 and 20.3% of residents were 65 years of age or older. For every 100 females there were 94.4 males, and for every 100 females age 18 and over there were 91.6 males age 18 and over. 23.4% of residents lived in urban areas, while 76.6% lived in rural areas.

The racial makeup of the county was 72.7% White, 20.5% Black or African American, 0.2% American Indian and Alaska Native, 0.6% Asian, 0.0% Native Hawaiian and Pacific Islander, 1.9% from some other race, and 4.0% from two or more races. Hispanic or Latino residents of any race comprised 3.5% of the population.

There were 7,534 households in the county, of which 32.8% had children under the age of 18 living with them and 25.4% had a female householder with no spouse or partner present. About 21.5% of all households were made up of individuals and 10.7% had someone living alone who was 65 years of age or older.

There were 8,318 housing units, of which 9.4% were vacant. Among occupied housing units, 76.1% were owner-occupied and 23.9% were renter-occupied. The homeowner vacancy rate was 1.2% and the rental vacancy rate was 4.5%.

== Politics ==
As of the 2020s, Morgan County is a strongly Republican voting county, voting 73% for Donald Trump in 2024. For elections to the United States House of Representatives, Morgan County is part of Georgia's 10th congressional district, currently represented by Mike Collins. For elections to the Georgia State Senate, Morgan County is part of District 42. For elections to the Georgia House of Representatives, Morgan County is part of District 114.

United States presidential election results for Morgan County, Georgia
Year	Republican		Democratic		Third party(ies)	
Year	No.	%	No.	%	No.	%
1912	37	6.19%	537	89.80%	24	4.01%
1916	58	7.63%	643	84.61%	59	7.76%
1920	176	28.12%	450	71.88%	0	0.00%
1924	126	16.41%	598	77.86%	44	5.73%
1928	208	20.57%	803	79.43%	0	0.00%
1932	74	7.36%	923	91.75%	9	0.89%
1936	37	3.17%	1,130	96.66%	2	0.17%
1940	24	4.72%	484	95.28%	0	0.00%
1944	51	4.18%	1,166	95.50%	4	0.33%
1948	115	8.18%	1,147	81.58%	144	10.24%
1952	247	13.03%	1,649	86.97%	0	0.00%
1956	246	14.15%	1,492	85.85%	0	0.00%
1960	373	20.04%	1,488	79.96%	0	0.00%
1964	1,485	47.31%	1,654	52.69%	0	0.00%
1968	616	20.67%	973	32.65%	1,391	46.68%
1972	2,007	75.03%	668	24.97%	0	0.00%
1976	904	28.45%	2,274	71.55%	0	0.00%
1980	1,323	36.04%	2,276	62.00%	72	1.96%
1984	2,301	57.31%	1,714	42.69%	0	0.00%
1988	2,108	58.10%	1,508	41.57%	12	0.33%
1992	1,797	40.34%	2,057	46.17%	601	13.49%
1996	2,118	45.92%	2,111	45.77%	383	8.30%
2000	3,524	59.71%	2,238	37.92%	140	2.37%
2004	4,902	67.64%	2,304	31.79%	41	0.57%
2008	5,987	65.32%	3,091	33.73%	87	0.95%
2012	6,186	68.42%	2,753	30.45%	102	1.13%
2016	6,559	69.22%	2,663	28.11%	253	2.67%
2020	8,231	70.29%	3,353	28.63%	126	1.08%
2024	9,589	72.75%	3,533	26.80%	59	0.45%

United States Senate election results for Morgan County, Georgia2
Year	Republican		Democratic		Third party(ies)	
Year	No.	%	No.	%	No.	%
2020	8,259	71.03%	3,151	27.10%	217	1.87%
2020	7,730	71.40%	3,097	28.60%	0	0.00%

United States Senate election results for Morgan County, Georgia3
Year	Republican		Democratic		Third party(ies)	
Year	No.	%	No.	%	No.	%
2020	4,360	37.68%	2,392	20.67%	4,818	41.64%
2020	7,696	71.09%	3,129	28.91%	0	0.00%
2022	7,322	71.38%	2,762	26.93%	174	1.70%
2022	6,851	72.10%	2,651	27.90%	0	0.00%

Georgia Gubernatorial election results for Morgan County
Year	Republican		Democratic		Third party(ies)	
Year	No.	%	No.	%	No.	%
2022	7,764	75.19%	2,473	23.95%	89	0.86%

== Education ==
Public education is provided by the Morgan County School District.

== See also ==
- National Register of Historic Places listings in Morgan County, Georgia
- List of counties in Georgia
