= May O'Flaherty =

Irish bookshop owner and literary patron

- Born: Mary Angela Flaherty; 14 May 1904; Youghal, County Cork, Ireland
- Died: 27 March 1991 (aged 86); Dalkey, Dublin, Ireland
- Occupation: Book store proprietor

May O'Flaherty (born Mary Angela Flaherty, 14 May 1904 – 27 March 1991) was an Irish book store proprietor, known as the owner of Parsons Bookshop at Baggot Street Bridge in Dublin's southside. Through the shop's writer-in-residence schemes, and general environment, she patronised and befriended prominent Irish writers such as Patrick Kavanagh, Brendan Behan, and Seamus Heaney.

== Background ==
May was born on 14 May 1904 in Youghal, County Cork, to Thomas Flaherty, a Royal Irish Constabulary sergeant, originally from County Kerry, and Catherine (née Drummy) O'Flaherty, from Kilmichael, County Cork. The family moved from Youghal to Dublin, due to Thomas' placement, living in Arran Quay and near the North Circular Road. May worked in a furrier's on Grafton Street for a time.

== Parsons Bookshop ==
O'Flaherty purchased Parsons general store on Baggot Street Bridge in 1949. The purchase was somewhat inadvertent, as her intention was to be in the purchase auction in order to inflate the price. Books were a small part of the business early on, attracting custom from locally based poet Patrick Kavanagh. At Kavanagh's suggestion, a deal was struck with Oxford University Press and the book offering improved over time. Kavanagh's presence changed from that of a customer to a guest as his interactions with Parsons became more familiar. Other writers followed with Brendan Behan, and Brian O'Nolan among the most notable early on. Less-established writers thrived in the environment with Hugh Leonard, Michael Hartnett, Peter Costello and Adrian Kenny.

The area, and the cultural movement associated with it, not least with Parsons, became known as "Baggotonia".

When Kavanagh died in 1967, O'Flaherty created a shrine to his work in the shop.

Later writers supported by the store included Paul Durcan, Seamus Heaney, Brendan Kennelly, John Banville, Ben Kiely and Maeve Binchy. Mary Lavin stated "Parsons is my parlour."

In April 1989, O'Flaherty sold the leasehold for IR£156,000, drawing media attention. In 2004, the Monaghan Association erected a plaque commemorating Kavanagh on the wall of the former Parsons premises.

== Later life and death ==
In retirement, O'Flaherty lived in the suburban town of Dun Laoghaire, before moving to a nursing home in Dalkey, where she died on 27 March 1991. She was interred in Glasnevin Cemetery.
