= Véry =

- Commune
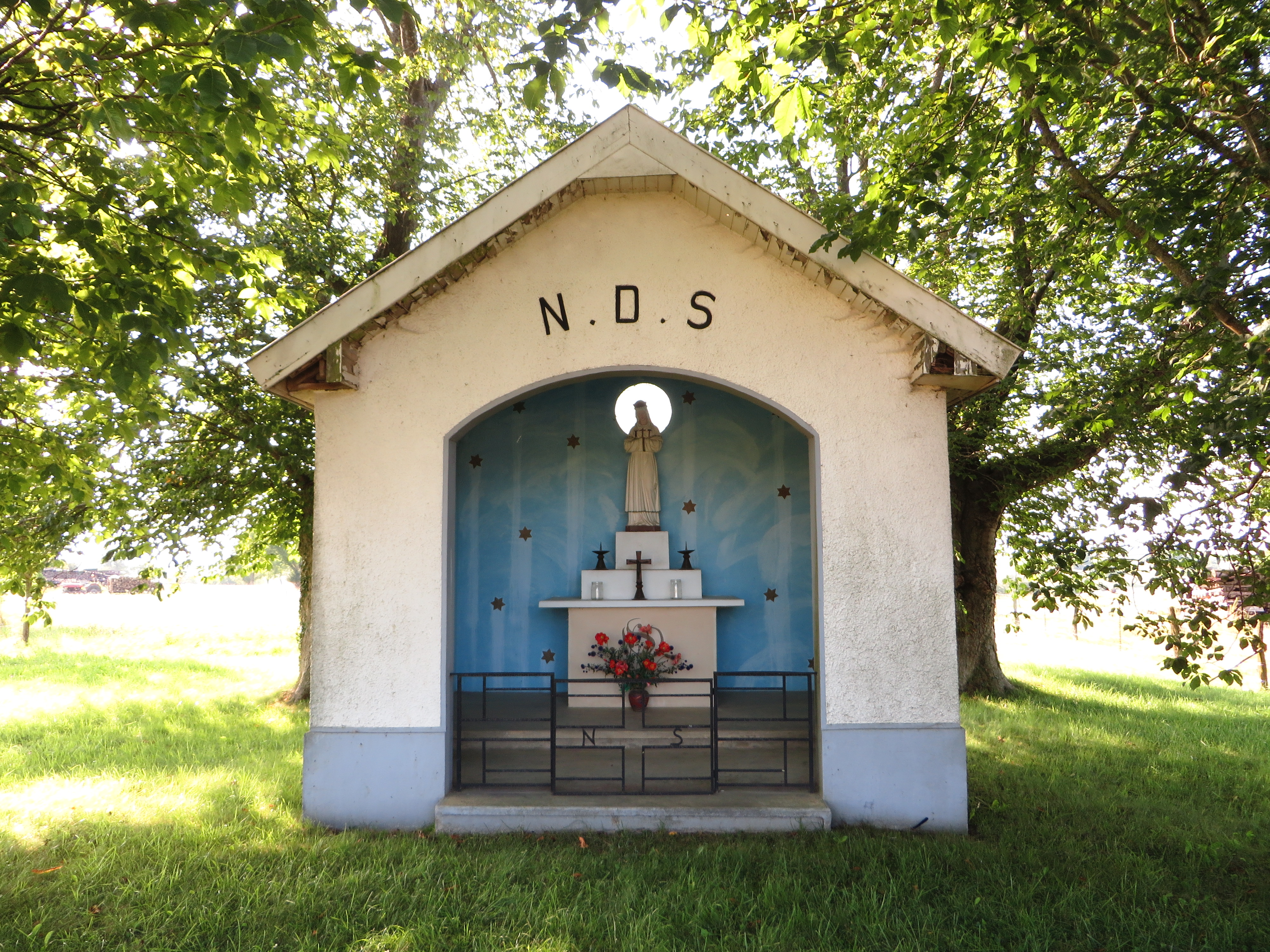
- The chapel in Véry

- Coat of arms
- Location of Véry
- Location within France Location within Grand Est
- Coordinates: 49°15′00″N 5°04′07″E
- Country: France
- Region: Grand Est
- Department: Meuse
- Arrondissement: Verdun
- Canton: Clermont-en-Argonne
- Intercommunality: Argonne-Meuse

Government
  - Mayor (2020–2026): Gabriel Clanche
- Area^{1}: 11.74 km^{2} (4.53 sq mi)
- Elevation: 173 m (568 ft)
- Highest elevation: 251 m (823 ft)
- Lowest elevation: 165 m (541 ft)
- Population (2023): 79
  - Density: 6.7/km^{2} (17/sq mi)
- Time zone: UTC+01:00 (CET)
  - Summer (DST): UTC+02:00 (CEST)
- INSEE/Postal code: 55549 /55270
- ^{1} French Land Register data, which excludes lakes, ponds, glaciers > 1 km^{2} (0.386 sq mi or 247 acres) and river estuaries.

Véry (French pronunciation: [veʁi]) is a commune in the Meuse department in Grand Est in north-eastern France.

== See also ==
- Communes of the Meuse department
