= Bostwick, Georgia =

- City
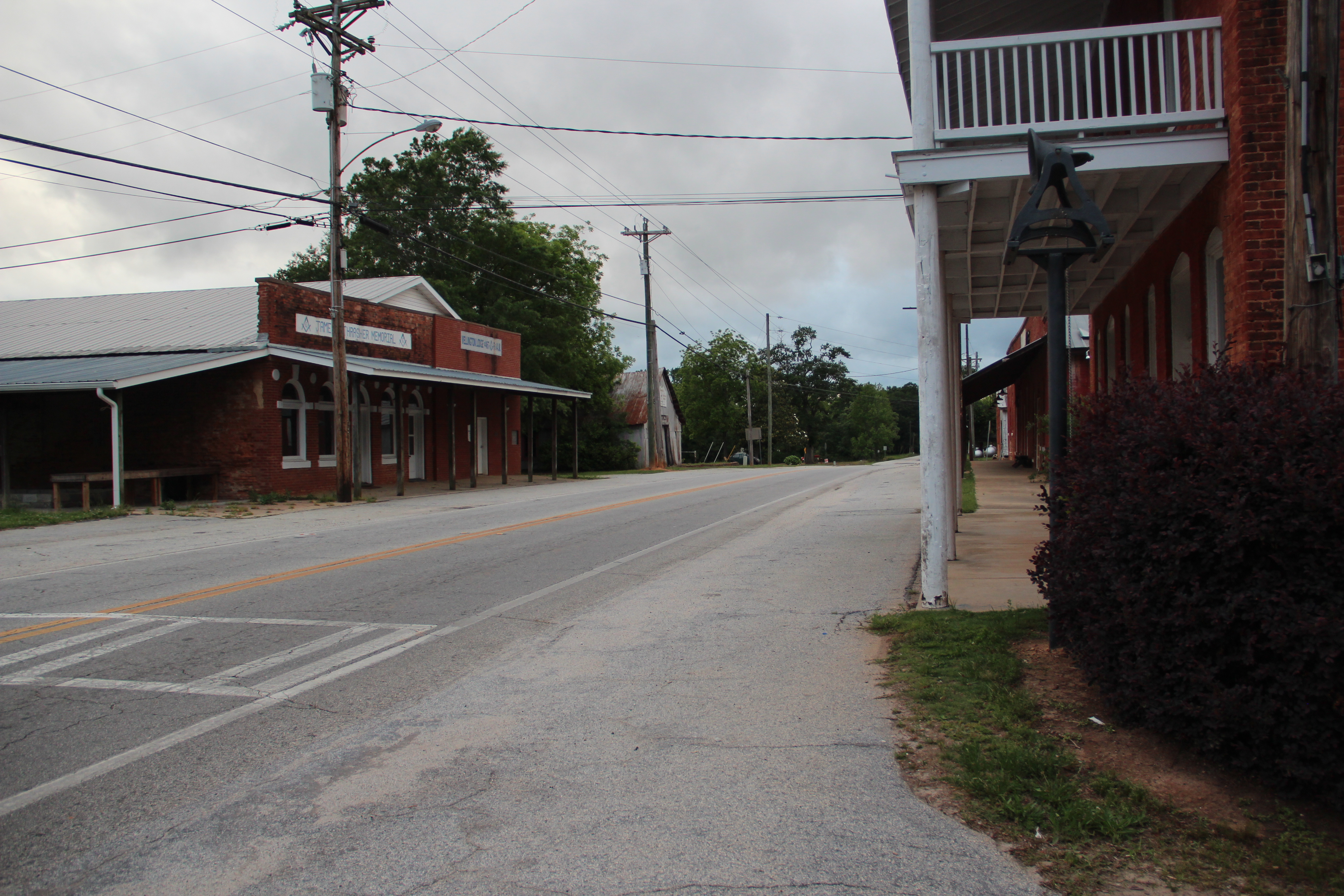
- Georgia State Route 83 in Bostwick

- Location in Morgan County and the state of Georgia
- Coordinates: 33°44′14″N 83°30′54″W
- Country: United States
- State: Georgia
- County: Morgan

Area
  - Total: 2.92 sq mi (7.56 km^{2})
  - Land: 2.90 sq mi (7.52 km^{2})
  - Water: 0.015 sq mi (0.04 km^{2})
- Elevation: 761 ft (232 m)

Population (2020)
  - Total: 378
  - Density: 130.1/sq mi (50.23/km^{2})
- Time zone: UTC-5 (Eastern (EST))
  - Summer (DST): UTC-4 (EDT)
- ZIP code: 30623
- Area code: 706
- FIPS code: 13-09488
- GNIS feature ID: 0331211
- Website: bostwickga.com

Bostwick is a city in Morgan County, Georgia, United States. As of the 2020 census, the city had a population of 378.

== History ==
Bostwick was incorporated by the Georgia General Assembly in 1902. The community was named in honor of John Bostwick, a founding resident.

== Geography ==
Bostwick is located in south Morgan County at 33°44′14″N 83°30′54″W (33.737220, -83.514957). Georgia State Route 83 passes through the town, leading south 10 miles (16 km) to Madison, the county seat, and northwest 13 miles (21 km) to Monroe.

According to the United States Census Bureau, the town has a total area of 2.9 square miles (7.5 km^{2}), of which 0.02 square miles (0.05 km^{2}), or 0.51%, is water. Bostwick is drained to the north by Bucks Creek, a tributary of Jacks Creek, and to the south by Beaverdam Creek, a tributary of Big Sandy Creek. The entire town is part of the Apalachee River watershed, flowing to the Oconee River.

== Demographics ==
Historical population
Census	Pop.	Note	%±
1910	333		—
1920	424		27.3%
1930	298		−29.7%
1940	318		6.7%
1950	287		−9.7%
1960	272		−5.2%
1970	289		6.3%
1980	357		23.5%
1990	307		−14.0%
2000	322		4.9%
2010	365		13.4%
2020	378		3.6%
U.S. Decennial Census

As of the census of 2000, there were 322 people, 125 households, and 88 families residing in the town. By 2020, its population was 378.
