= Buckhead, Morgan County, Georgia =

Buckhead, Georgia
- Town
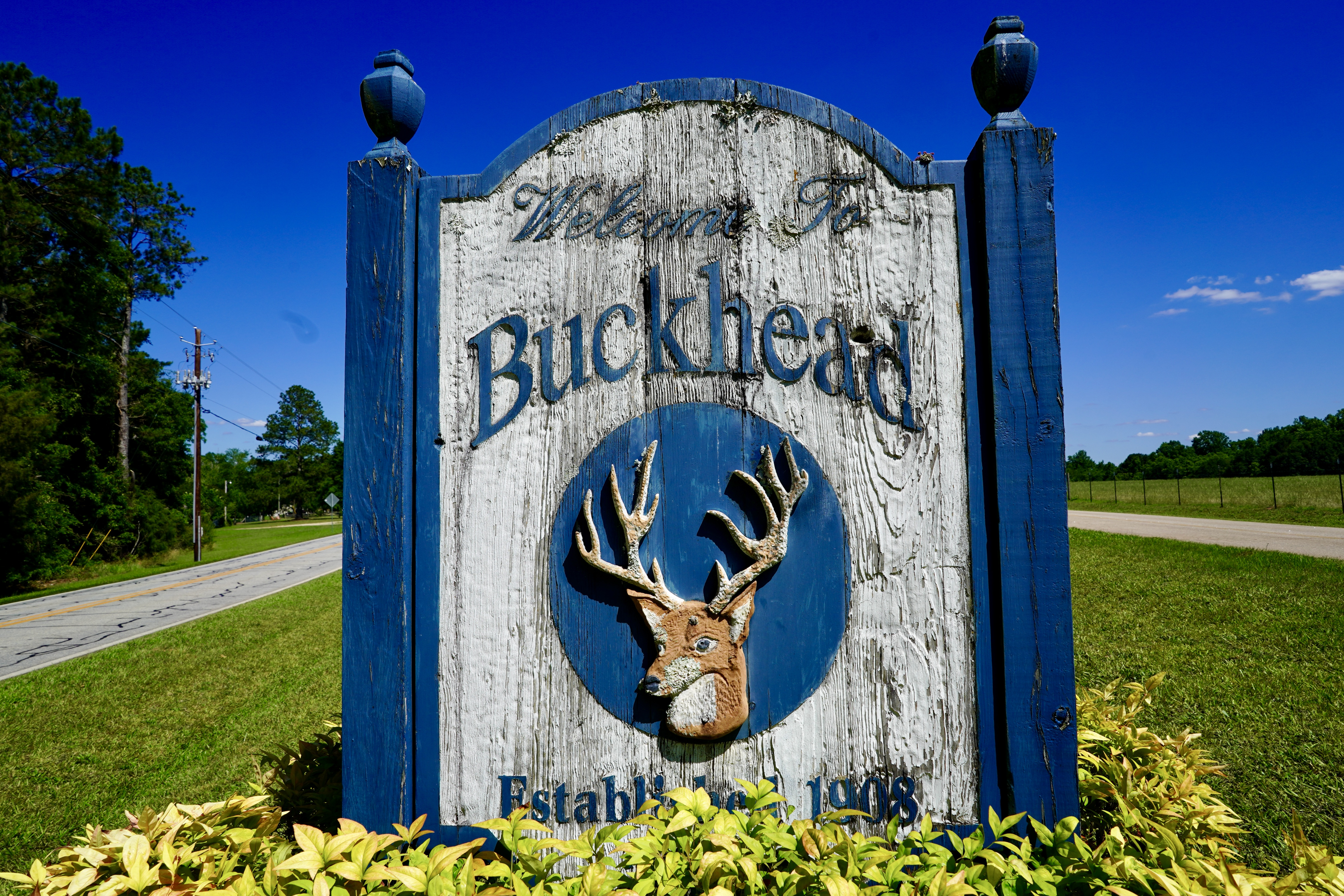

- Location in Morgan County and the state of Georgia
- Coordinates: 33°34′5″N 83°21′45″W
- Country: United States
- State: Georgia
- County: Morgan

Area
  - Total: 0.81 sq mi (2.11 km^{2})
  - Land: 0.81 sq mi (2.09 km^{2})
  - Water: 0.0077 sq mi (0.02 km^{2})
- Elevation: 620 ft (190 m)

Population (2020)
  - Total: 194
  - Density: 242.2/sq mi (93.5/km^{2})
- Time zone: UTC-5 (Eastern (EST))
  - Summer (DST): UTC-4 (EDT)
- ZIP code: 30625
- Area code: 706
- FIPS code: 13-11672
- GNIS feature ID: 0354900
- Website: https://townofbuckhead.org/

Buckhead is a town in Morgan County, Georgia, United States. As of the 2020 census, the town had a population of 194.

== History ==
The Georgia General Assembly incorporated Buckhead as a town in 1908. According to tradition, Buckhead was named from a pioneer incident when hunters shot a deer and publicly mounted the buck's head onto a tree.

== Geography ==
Buckhead is located in southeastern Morgan County at 33°34′5″N 83°21′45″W (33.568012, -83.362443). It is 7 miles (11 km) east-southeast of Madison, the county seat. Interstate 20 passes 1 mile (1.6 km) south of the town, with access from Exit 121 (Seven Islands Road). Via I-20, Buckhead is 65 miles (105 km) east of Atlanta and 85 miles (137 km) west of Augusta.

According to the United States Census Bureau, Buckhead has a total area of 0.8 square miles (2.1 km^{2}), of which 0.008 square miles (0.02 km^{2}), or 0.99%, are water. The town is drained to the north by tributaries of the Apalachee River and to the south by tributaries of Sugar Creek, both of which flow southeast to the Oconee River.

== Demographics ==
Historical population
| Census | Pop. | Note | %± |
|---|---|---|---|
| 1900 | 240 | | — |
| 1910 | 384 | | 60.0% |
| 1920 | 451 | | 17.4% |
| 1930 | 273 | | −39.5% |
| 1940 | 214 | | −21.6% |
| 1950 | 220 | | 2.8% |
| 1960 | 169 | | −23.2% |
| 1970 | 177 | | 4.7% |
| 1980 | 219 | | 23.7% |
| 1990 | 176 | | −19.6% |
| 2000 | 205 | | 16.5% |
| 2010 | 171 | | −16.6% |
| 2020 | 194 | | 13.5% |
U.S. Decennial Census

At the 2000 census there were 205 people, 68 households, and 55 families in the town. By 2020, its population was 194.
