= Georgia Writers Hall of Fame =

- Awarded for: "Georgia writers, past and present, whose work reflects the character of the state — its land and people"
- Location: Richard B. Russell Building; 300 South Hull Street; Athens, Georgia
- Country: United States
- Presented by: Hargrett Rare Book and Manuscript Library, University of Georgia Libraries
- First award: 2000
- Website: Georgia Writers Hall of Fame

The Georgia Writers Hall of Fame honors writers who have made significant contributions to the literary legacy of the state of Georgia. Established in 2000 by the University of Georgia Libraries’ Hargrett Rare Book and Manuscript Library, the Hall of Fame existed as a virtual presence until 2012, when it was given a physical space within the university's Richard B. Russell Building.

The Georgia Writers Hall of Fame accepts public nominations. New inductees are elected by a board of judges convened by the University of Georgia librarian. Writers are eligible for nomination if they were born in Georgia or if they produced an important work while living in the state.

It was hoped by the University of Georgia Libraries that the program "would attract donors by bringing living authors to campus and celebrating those of the past; also the ceremony and exhibits, ideally growing each year, could draw in funds for the Libraries' much-needed new buildings and its endowments, along with opening up possibilities for cultural programs and attracting additional writers (or their estates) who might choose to house their archives."

== Inductees ==
Georgia Writers Hall of Fame
| Name | Image | Year Inducted | Birth–Death | Georgia Connection |
|---|---|---|---|---|
| Erskine Caldwell | | 2000 | 1903-1987 | Born in Moreland, Georgia |
| James Dickey | | 2000 | 1923-1997 | Born in Atlanta, Georgia |
| W.E.B. Du Bois | | 2000 | 1868-1963 | Lived in Atlanta, Georgia |
| Joel Chandler Harris | | 2000 | 1848-1908 | Born in Eatonton, Georgia |
| John Oliver Killens | | 2000 | 1916-1987 | Born in Macon, Georgia |
| Martin Luther King, Jr. | | 2000 | 1929-1968 | Born in Atlanta, Georgia |
| Sidney Lanier | | 2000 | 1842-1881 | Born in Macon, Georgia |
| Augustus Baldwin Longstreet | | 2000 | 1790-1870 | Born in Augusta, Georgia |
| Carson McCullers | | 2000 | 1917-1967 | Born in Columbus, Georgia |
| Margaret Mitchell | | 2000 | 1900-1949 | Born in Atlanta, Georgia |
| Flannery O'Connor | | 2000 | 1925-1964 | Born in Savannah, Georgia |
| Lillian Smith | | 2000 | 1897-1966 | Lived in Screamer Mountain, in Clayton, Georgia |
| Byron Herbert Reece | | 2001 | 1917-1958 | Born in Blairsville, Georgia |
| Harry Crews | | 2002 | 1935-2012 | Born in Alma, Georgia |
| Jean Toomer | | 2002 | 1894-1967 | Sparta, Georgia, inspired the fictional setting of his novel Cane |
| Alice Walker | | 2002 | b. February 9, 1944 | Born in Eatonton, Georgia |
| Conrad Aiken | | 2003 | 1889-1973 | Born in Savannah, Georgia |
| Elias Boudinot | | 2003 | 1804-1839 | Born in Oothcaloga, Cherokee Nation (present-day Calhoun, Georgia) |
| Pat Conroy | | 2004 | 1945-2016 | Born in Atlanta, Georgia |
| Henry W. Grady | | 2004 | 1850-1889 | Born in Athens, Georgia |
| Ralph Emerson McGill | | 2004 | 1898-1969 | Lived in Atlanta, Georgia |
| Jimmy Carter | | 2006 | 1924-2024 | Born in Plains, Georgia |
| Terry Kay | | 2006 | 1938-2020 | Born in Royston, Georgia |
| Frank Yerby | | 2006 | 1916-1991 | Born in Augusta, Georgia |
| Caroline Miller | | 2007 | 1903-1992 | Born in Waycross, Georgia |
| Ferrol Sams | | 2007 | 1922-2013 | Born in Fayette County, Georgia |
| Celestine Sibley | | 2007 | 1914-1999 | Lived in Atlanta, Georgia |
| Anne Rivers Siddons | | 2007 | 1936-2019 | Born in Atlanta, Georgia |
| John Stone | | 2007 | 1936-2008 | Lived in Atlanta, Georgia |
| Bailey White | | 2008 | b. May 31, 1950 | Born in Thomasville, Georgia |
| Calder Baynard Willingham, Jr. | | 2008 | 1922-1995 | Born in Atlanta, Georgia |
| Raymond Andrews | | 2009 | 1934-1991 | Born in Madison, Georgia |
| Coleman Barks | | 2009 | 1937-2026 | Lived in Athens, Georgia |
| David Bottoms | | 2009 | 1949-2023 | Born in Canton, Georgia |
| Robert J. Burch | | 2009 | 1925-2007 | Born in Inman, Georgia |
| Judith Ortiz Cofer | | 2010 | 1952-2016 | Lived in Louisville, Georgia |
| Georgia Douglas Johnson | | 2010 | 1877-1966 | Born in Atlanta, Georgia |
| Walter Francis White | | 2010 | 1893-1955 | Born in Atlanta, Georgia |
| Philip Lee Williams | Philip Lee Williams | 2010 | b. January 30, 1950 | Born in Athens, Georgia |
| Melissa Fay Greene | | 2011 | b. December 30, 1952 | Born in Macon, Georgia |
| James Patrick Kilgo | | 2011 | 1941-2002 | Lived in Athens, Georgia |
| Johnny Mercer | | 2011 | 1909-1976 | Born in Savannah, Georgia |
| Natasha Trethewey | | 2011 | b. April 26, 1966 | Lived in Athens and Atlanta, Georgia |
| Toni Cade Bambara | | 2013 | 1939-1995 | Lived in Atlanta, Georgia |
| Judson Mitcham | | 2013 | b. 1948 | Born in Monroe, Georgia |
| Olive Ann Burns | | 2014 | 1924-1990 | Born in Banks County, Georgia |
| Mary Hood | | 2014 | b. September 16, 1946 | Born in Brunswick, Georgia |
| Alfred Uhry | | 2014 | b. December 3, 1936 | Born in Atlanta, Georgia |
| Vereen Bell | | 2015 | 1911-1941 | Born in Cairo, Georgia |
| Taylor Branch | | 2015 | b. January 14, 1947 | Born in Atlanta, Georgia |
| Paul Hemphill | | 2015 | 1936-2009 | Lived in Atlanta, Georgia |
| Janisse Ray | | 2015 | b. February 2, 1962 | Born in Baxley, Georgia |
| Roy Blount Jr. | | 2016 | b. October 4, 1941 | Lived in Decatur, Georgia |
| Brainard Cheney | | 2016 | 1900-1990 | Born in Fitzgerald, Georgia |
| Katharine DuPre Lumpkin | | 2016 | 1895-1988 | Born in Macon, Georgia |
| James Alan McPherson | | 2016 | 1943-2016 | Born in Savannah, Georgia |
| Bill Shipp | | 2016 | 1933-2023 | Born in Marietta, Georgia |
| James Cobb | | 2017 | b. April 13, 1947 | Born in Hart County, Georgia |
| Alfred Corn | | 2017 | b. August 14, 1943 | Born in Bainbridge, Georgia |
| Eugenia Price | | 2017 | 1916-1996 | Lived in Brunswick, Georgia |
| Kevin Young | | 2017 | b. November 8, 1970 | Lived in Athens and Atlanta, Georgia |
| Furman Bisher | | 2018 | 1918-2012 | Atlanta Journal-Constitution sportswriter and editor |
| Michael Bishop | | 2018 | 1945-2023 | Lived in LaGrange, Georgia |
| Tayari Jones | | 2018 | b. November 30, 1970 | Born in Atlanta, Georgia |
| Frances Newman | | 2018 | 1883-1928 | Born in Atlanta, Georgia |
| Cynthia Shearer | | 2018 | b. June 25, 1955 | Lived in Alapaha, Georgia |
| John T. Edge | | 2019 | b. December 22, 1962 | Born in Clinton, Georgia |
| Julia Collier Harris | | 2019 | 1875-1967 | Born in Atlanta, Georgia |
| A. E. Stallings | | 2019 | b. July 2, 1968 | Born in Decatur, Georgia |
| Valerie Boyd | | 2021 | 1963-2022 | Born in Atlanta, Georgia |
| Jericho Brown | | 2021 | b. April 14, 1976 | Lived in Atlanta, Georgia |
| Pearl Cleage | | 2021 | b. December 7, 1948 | Lived in Atlanta, Georgia |
| John Lewis | | 2021 | 1940-2020 | Lived in Atlanta, Georgia |
| Thomas Lux | | 2021 | 1946-2017 | Lived in Atlanta, Georgia |
| Sue Monk Kidd | | 2021 | b. August 12, 1948 | Born in Albany, Georgia |
| Clarence Major | | 2021 | b. December 31, 1936 | Born in Atlanta, Georgia |
| Daniel Boorstin | | 2023 | 1914-2004 | Born in Atlanta, Georgia |
| Percival Everett | | 2023 | b. December 22, 1956 | Born in Fort Gordon, Georgia |
| Frances Mayes | | 2023 | b. March 23, 1940 | Born in Fitzgerald, Georgia |
| Robert Sengstacke Abbott | | 2024 | 1868-1940 | Born in St. Simons, Georgia |
| Wyatt Prunty | | 2024 | b. May 15, 1947 | Lived in Athens, Georgia |
| Barbara Brown Taylor | | 2024 | b. September 21, 1951 | Lived in Habersham County, Georgia |
| Tina McElroy Ansa | | 2025 | 1949-2024 | Born in Macon, Georgia |
| Deborah Blum | | 2025 | b. October 19, 1954 | Lived in Athens, Georgia |
| Anthony Grooms | | 2025 | b. January 15, 1955 | Lived in Atlanta, Georgia |
| Alice Friman | | 2026 | b. October 20, 1933 | Lived in Milledgeville, Georgia |
| Charlie Smith | | 2026 | b. June 27, 1947 | Born in Moultrie, Georgia |
| Shay Youngblood | | 2026 | 1959-2024 | Born in Columbus, Georgia |
