= William Sessions =

William Sessions may refer to:

- William S. Sessions (1930–2020), American attorney, jurist and director of the FBI
- William K. Sessions III (born 1947), American judge
- William A. Sessions (1928–2016), American author, biographer and professor of English
