= The Chattahoochee Review =

- Language: English
- Edited by: Anna Schachner

Publication details
- History: 1981–present
- Publisher: Georgia Perimeter College (United States)

Standard abbreviations
- ISO 4: Chattahoochee Rev.

Indexing
- ISSN: 0741-9155

Links
- Journal homepage

The Chattahoochee Review is a literary journal published by Georgia State University's Perimeter College. It is widely regarded as one of the leading voices in Southern fiction and was established in 1981. The journal contains fiction, poetry, and non-fiction.

The journal awards the Lamar York Prizes for Fiction and Nonfiction and the Townsend Prize for Fiction.

== Editors ==
The following are the current editors of the journal:

- Editor - Anna Schachner
- Managing Editor - Lydia Ship
- Fiction editor - Buell Wisner
- Poetry editor - Michael Diebert
- Non-fiction editor - Amber Nicole Brooks

== History ==
The Chattahoochee Review was founded in 1981 by English professor and critic Lamar York, who was its founding editor. In 1997, Lawrence Hetrick became editor of the journal.

In 2003, the journal received the "Governor's Awards in the Humanities" from the State of Georgia in recognition of its legacy. In 2011, Anna Schachner became editor of the journal.

Writers whose work has appeared in the journal include William Gay, George Singleton, Natasha Trethewey, Walter Griffin, Anthony Grooms, Terry Kay, Judson Mitcham, and Marion Montgomery.

The journal awards the Lamar York Prizes for Fiction and Nonfiction annually to a winning essay and story.

The Townsend Prize for Fiction is administrated every two years by The Chattahoochee Review and the Georgia Center for the Book. The award is given to an "outstanding novel or short-story collection published by a Georgia writer during the past two years" and is "the state of Georgia’s oldest and most prestigious literary award."

== See also ==
- List of literary magazines
