= R. H. W. Dillard =

American journalist (1937–2023)

- Born: Richard Henry Wilde Dillard; October 11, 1937; Roanoke, Virginia, U.S.
- Died: April 4, 2023 (aged 85); Roanoke, Virginia, U.S.
- Education: Roanoke College (B.A.); University of Virginia (M.A., Ph.D.)
- Occupations: Poet, author, critic, translator, professor
- Spouse(s): Annie Doak (m. 1965; div. 1975) Cathryn Hankla (m. 1979; div. 1992)
- Writing career
- Years active: 1960s–2023
- Genres: Poetry, fiction, literary criticism, translation
- Notable works: News of the Nile; After Borges; The Book of Changes; Sallies; The Greeting: New & Selected Poems
- Notable awards: Academy of American Poets Prize (1961); O. B. Hardison Jr. Poetry Prize; George Garrett Award for Service to Contemporary Literature (2007)

Richard Henry Wilde Dillard (October 11, 1937 – April 4, 2023) was an American poet, author, critic, and translator.

== Life and career ==
Richard Henry Wilde Dillard was born in Roanoke, Virginia, Dillard was best known as a poet. He was also highly regarded as a writer of fiction and critical essays, as well as one of the screenwriters for the cult classic Frankenstein Meets the Space Monster. He received his Bachelor of Arts degree from Roanoke College and went on to receive of a Master of Arts (1959) and the Ph.D. (1965) from the University of Virginia. While at the University of Virginia he was both a Woodrow Wilson and a DuPont Fellow. He was considered something of an institution at Hollins University where he had been teaching creative writing, literature, and film studies since 1964. Dillard had been the editor of the Hollins Critic from 1996. He also served as the vice president of the Film Journal from 1973 to 1980.

Dillard was the winner of numerous awards for his writing, including the Academy of American Poets Prize, the O. B. Hardison, Jr. Poetry Prize, and the Hanes Award for Poetry. In 2007, he was awarded the George Garrett Award for Service to Contemporary Literature by the Association of Writers & Writing Programs. Dillard influenced many contemporary writers including both his ex-wives Annie Dillard and Cathryn Hankla. Others include Henry S. Taylor, Lee Smith, Lucinda MacKethan, Anne Jones, Rosanne Coggeshall, Wyn Cooper, Jill McCorkle, Madison Smartt Bell, and Julia Johnson.

Dillard died in Roanoke, Virginia on April 4, 2023, at the age of 85.

== Bibliography ==
- 1966 The Day I Stopped Dreaming About Barbara Steele
- 1971 News of the Nile
- 1972 After Borges
- 1974 The Book of Changes
- 1976 Horror Films
- 1981 The Greeting: New & Selected Poems
- 1983 The First Man on the Sun
- 1988 Understanding George Garrett
- 1994 Just Here, Just Now
- 1995 Omniphobia
- 1995 Plautus's The Little Box
- 1999 Aristophanes's The Sexual Congress
- 2001 Sallies
- 2011 What Is Owed the Dead
- 2014 Not Ideas
