= Celestine Sibley =

American writer (1914–1999)

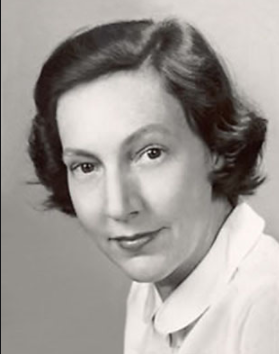
- Sibley c. 1955
- Born: May 23, 1914; Holley, Florida, U.S.
- Died: August 15, 1999 (aged 85); Dog Island, Florida
- Occupation: Writer

Celestine Sibley (May 23, 1914 – August 15, 1999) was an American newspaper reporter, syndicated columnist, and novelist in Atlanta, Georgia, for nearly sixty years.

== Biography ==
Sibley was born in Holley, Florida. She graduated from high school in Mobile, Alabama, and began her journalistic career writing for the Mobile Press-Register and the Pensacola News Journal.

Sibley gained fame as an award-winning reporter, editor, and beloved columnist for the Atlanta Constitution from 1941 to 1999. According to the New Georgia Encyclopedia, "Sibley was one of the most popular and long-running columnists for the Constitution, and her well-written and poignant essays on Southern culture made her an icon in the South." In addition to her column, she covered Georgia politics along with many high-profile court cases. She also wrote 25 books, both nonfiction and fiction, including mystery novels.

She covered the Georgia General Assembly as a reporter from 1958 to 1978. In 2000, after her death, the press gallery in the Georgia House of Representatives was named in her honor. She won the first Townsend Prize for Fiction in 1982 for her book Children, My Children. After an illness, Sibley died, age 85, at her beach house on Dog Island, Florida.

Sibley's granddaughter, Sibley Fleming, wrote a book about her grandmother, Celestine Sibley: A Granddaughter's Reminiscence (2000).

Celestine Sibley and Sibley Fleming co-edited a collection of Sibley's writings, The Celestine Sibley Sampler: Writings & Photographs With Tributes to the Beloved Author and Journalist (1997).

== Selected works ==
- The Malignant Heart, Doubleday (New York City), 1957.
- Peachtree Street, U.S.A.: An Affectionate Portrait of Atlanta, Doubleday, 1963; reprinted as Peachtree Street, U.S.A.: A Personal Look at Atlanta and Its History, Peachtree Publishers (Atlanta), 1994.
- Christmas in Georgia, Doubleday, 1964.
- A Place Called Sweet Apple, Doubleday, 1967.
- Dear Store: An Affectionate Portrait of Rich's, Doubleday, 1967.
- Especially at Christmas, Doubleday, 1969.
- Mothers Are Always Special, Doubleday, 1970.
- The Sweet Apple Gardening Book, Doubleday, 1972.
- Day by Day with Celestine Sibley, Doubleday, 1975.
- Small Blessings, Doubleday, 1977.
- Jincey, Simon & Schuster (New York City), 1979.
- The Magical Realm of Sallie Middleton, Oxmoor House (Birmingham, AL), 1980.
- Children, My Children, Harper (New York City), 1981.
- Young 'Uns: A Celebration, Harper, 1982.
- For All Seasons, Peachtree Publishers, 1984.
- Turned Funny: A Memoir, Harper, 1988.
- Christmas in Georgia, Peachtree Publishers, 1985.
- Tokens of Myself, Longstreet Press, 1990.

=== "Kate Mulcay" mystery novels ===
- Ah, Sweet Mystery, HarperCollins (New York City), 1991.
- Straight as an Arrow, HarperCollins, 1992.
- Dire Happenings at Scratch Ankle, HarperCollins, 1993.
- A Plague of Kinfolks, HarperCollins, 1995.
- Spider in the Sink, HarperCollins, 1997.

== Awards ==
- Three awards from Associated Press for news stories
- Two awards from Georgia Conference on Social Work for stories contributing to human welfare
- Radio and television awards from Pall Mall
- Awards from Dixie Council of Authors and Journalists, for Small Blessings
- Green Eyeshadow Award from Sigma Delta Chi
- Posthumously inducted into the Georgia Writers Hall of Fame in 2007.
- Inducted into the Georgia Women of Achievement in 2010.
- Inducted into the Georgia Newspaper Hall of Fame in 2019.
