= Townsend Prize for Fiction =

The Townsend Prize for Fiction is awarded every two years to the best piece of literary fiction written and published while the author lived in Georgia. Past award winners include Alice Walker, Terry Kay, Ha Jin, Philip Lee Williams, Ferrol Sams, Kathryn Stockett, Mary Hood, and Judson Mitcham, among others.

== History ==
The Prize was started in 1981 to honor the legacy of Jim Townsend, founding editor of Atlanta magazine, the model of the modern city magazine, and mentor to a generation of iconic Southern writers like Pat Conroy and Anne Rivers Siddons. Administered since the 1990s by Georgia Perimeter College, now Georgia State University Perimeter College, and The Chattahoochee Review in 2021 stewardship of the Prize passed to the Atlanta Writers Club (AWC).

The AWC was founded in 1914 as a social and educational organization to teach the craft and business of writing, support local writers, and advance the cause of literature and literacy in the Southeast. Now a 1,400-member community of writers headquartered in Georgia, the AWC has long been a sponsor of the award.

In the spring of 2023, the Georgia Writers Museum in Eatonton, Georgia, the repository of the legacy of Georgia’s most accomplished writers and a hub for the promotion of the literary arts, joined the AWC as a partner in the Prize administration.

== Procedure ==
A reading committee composed of members of the Georgia literary community considers all eligible books and determines a list of ten finalists. These finalists are passed to three out-of-state judges who make the final decision of the Prize winner. A cash award and crystal dogwood trophy are presented to the winner at a ceremony in mid-April every other year. The next event will be in the spring of 2025. The ceremony is intended to honor the Townsend Prize recipient, recognize the accomplishments of the other nine finalists, and celebrate the rich literary history of the state of Georgia.

== Previous winners ==
Sources:

- Celestine Sibley, Children, My Children (1982)
- Alice Walker, The Color Purple (1984)
- Philip Lee Williams, The Heart of a Distant Forest (1986)
- Mary Hood, And Venus Is Blue (1988)
- Sara Flanigan, Alice (1989)
- Charlie Smith, The Lives of the Dead (1990)
- Ferrol Sams, When All the World Was Young (1991)
- Pam Durban, The Laughing Place (1994)
- JoAllen Bradham, Some Personal Papers (1996)
- Judson Mitcham, The Sweet Everlasting (1998)
- James Kilgo, Daughter of My People (2000)
- Ha Jin, The Bridegroom (short story collection) (2002)
- Terry Kay, The Valley of Light (2004)
- Judson Mitcham, Sabbath Creek (2006)
- Renee Dodd, A Cabinet of Wonders (2008)
- Kathryn Stockett, The Help (2010)
- Thomas Mullen, The Many Deaths of the Firefly Brothers (2012)
- Anthony Winkler, God Carlos (2014)
- Mary Hood, A Clear View of the Southern Sky (2016)
- Julia Franks, Over the Plain Houses (2018)
- Xhenet Aliu, Brass (2020)
- Sanjena Sathian, Gold Diggers (2023)
- Denene Millner, One Blood (2025)
