= Judith Ortiz Cofer =

Puerto Rican writer (1952–2016)

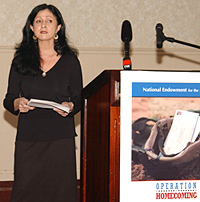
- Judith Ortiz Cofer
- Born: Judith Ortiz; February 24, 1952; Hormigueros, Puerto Rico
- Died: December 30, 2016 (aged 64); Louisville, Georgia, U.S.
- Education: Augusta College (BA); Florida Atlantic University (MA)
- Occupations: Writer, professor at the University of Georgia
- Writing career
- Genres: Poetry, short stories, autobiography, essays, young adult novels
- Notable work: A Partial Remembrance of a Puerto Rican Childhood

Judith Ortiz Cofer (February 24, 1952 – December 30, 2016) was a Puerto Rican author. Her critically acclaimed and award-winning work spans a range of literary genres including poetry, short stories, autobiography, essays, and young-adult fiction. Ortiz Cofer was the Emeritus Regents' and Franklin Professor of English and Creative Writing at the University of Georgia, where she taught undergraduate and graduate creative writing workshops for 26 years. In 2010, Ortiz Cofer was inducted into the Georgia Writers Hall of Fame, and in 2013, she won the university's 2014 Southeastern Conference Faculty Achievement Award.

Ortiz Cofer hailed from a family of storytellers and drew heavily from her personal experiences as a Puerto Rican American woman. In her work, Ortiz Cofer brings a poetic perspective to the intersection of memory and imagination. Writing in diverse genres, she investigated women issues, Latino culture, and the American South. Ortiz Cofer's work weaves together private life and public space through intimate portrayals of family relationships and rich descriptions of place. Her own papers are currently housed at the University of Georgia's Hargrett Rare Book and Manuscript Library.

== Early years ==
Judith Ortíz Cofer was born to Jesus Lugo Ortíz and Fanny Morot in Hormigueros, Puerto Rico, on February 24, 1952. She moved to Paterson, New Jersey with her family in 1956. Morot gave birth to Judith Ortíz Cofer when she was fifteen years old. They believed they would have more opportunities for young parents in America. Despite Lugo's passion for academia, he left school and joined the U.S. Navy. He was stationed in Panama when his daughter was born. He met Judith Ortiz Cofer for the first time two years later. Call Me Maria is a young adult novel that was published in 2004. It focuses on a teenage girl's transition from Puerto Rico to New York City. They often made back-and-forth trips between Paterson and Hormigueros. Ortíz Cofer reflects on these trips in her memoir, Silent Dancing: A Partial Remembrance of a Puerto Rican Childhood, stating they were annoying to both her education and her social life. While she was primarily educated in Paterson, New Jersey, she attended local schools in Puerto Rico while she was there. While in Puerto Rico, Ortíz Cofer would stay in the home of her grandmother. Her transition between Puerto Rico and New Jersey greatly influenced her writing because she was able to contrast the two cultures. In 1967, when Ortíz Cofer was fifteen, her family moved to Augusta, Georgia, where she lived until her death in 2016. There, she attended Butler High School. Judith and her brother, Ronaldo, initially resisted the family's move South. Upon arriving in Georgia, however, Ortíz Cofer was struck by Augusta's vibrant colors and vegetation compared with the gray concrete and skies of city-life in Paterson.

== Academic and literary career ==
Ortiz Cofer received a B.A. in English from Augusta College, and later an M.A. in English literature from Florida Atlantic University. Early in her writing career, Ortiz Cofer won fellowships from Oxford University and the Bread Loaf Writers' Conference, which enabled her to begin developing her multi-genre body of work. Cofer was fluent in English and Spanish and worked as a bilingual teacher in the public schools of Palm Beach County, Florida, during the 1974–1975 school year. After she received her master's degree and published her first collection of poems she became a lecturer in English at the University of Miami at Coral Gables.

In 1984, Ortiz Cofer joined the faculty of the University of Georgia as the Franklin Professor of English and Creative Writing. After 26 years of teaching undergraduate and graduate students, Ortiz Cofer retired from the University of Georgia in December 2013. Ortiz Cofer is best known for creative nonfiction works but she has worked in poetry, short fiction, children's books, and personal narrative. Cofer began her writing career with poetry, which she believed contained "the essence of language.” One of her earliest books was Peregrina (1986) which won the Riverstone International Chapbook Competition. She has received various awards such as grants from the Witter Bynner Foundation and the Georgia Council for the Arts, as well as fellowships from the National Endowment for the Arts for poetry, the Bread Loaf Writers' Conference, and the Florida Fine Arts Council. In 2010 Ortiz Cofer was admitted to the Georgia Writers Hall of Fame. ,

== Artistic and academic contributions ==
Ortiz Cofer's writing encompasses themes that emphasize the integration of cultural heritage and individual identity through the arts. She started the literary journal "Review" with the intention of giving marginalized writers a voice and promoting their writing. Additionally, Ortiz Cofer contributed to a number of literary anthologies, including as the well-known "The Norton Introduction to Literature," which is frequently used in college curriculum. She supervised creative writing students while teaching writing at the University of Georgia, Florida Atlantic University, and Rutgers University during her career. Along with writing and teaching, Ortiz Cofer also followed her interest for music by learning to play the guitar and penning songs. She frequently performed musically at conferences and literary gatherings to compliment her passion of reading.

== Death ==
In July 2014, Ortiz Cofer was diagnosed with a rare type of liver cancer shortly after her retirement. She died on December 30, 2016, at her home in Louisville, Georgia Jefferson County, Georgia. A memorial service was held on January 27, 2017, followed by a reception at the Demosthenian Hall. She is buried in the Louisville City Cemetery, Georgia.

== Awards and honors ==
- 1986, Riverstone International Chapbook Competition for her first collection of poems, Peregrina
- 1990, Silent Dancing: A Partial Remembrance of a Puerto Rican Childhood received the PEN/Martha Albrand Special Citation in Nonfiction
- 1990, the essay "More Room" was awarded the Pushcart Prize, which celebrates work published by small presses.
- 1991, the essay "Silent Dancing" was selected for The Best American Essays 1991
- 1994, first Hispanic to win the O. Henry Prize for the story “The Latin Deli”
- 1995, An Island Like You: Stories of the Barrio was named one of the best books of the year for young adults by the American Library Association
- 1995, University of Georgia's J. Hatten Howard III award, which recognizes faculty members who demonstrate notable potential in teaching Honors courses early in their teaching careers.
- 1996, Ortiz Cofer and illustrator Susan Guevara became the first recipients of the Pura Belpre Award for Hispanic children's literature.
- 1998, University of Georgia's Albert Christ-Janer Award
- 1999, Franklin Professorship
- 2006, Regents Professor Recognition
- 2007, Mentor Achievement Award, from the Association of Writers and Writing Programs
- 2010, Georgia Writers Hall of Fame induction
- 2011, Georgia Governor's Award in the Humanities
- 2013, University of Georgia's 2013 Southeastern Conference Faculty Achievement Award. This honor celebrates one faculty member from each SEC school and carries a $5,000 prize.

== Literary work ==
Ortiz Cofer's work can largely be classified as creative nonfiction. Her narrative self is strongly influenced by oral storytelling, which was inspired by her grandmother, an able storyteller in the tradition of teaching through storytelling among Puerto Rican women. Ortiz Cofer's autobiographical work often focuses on her attempts at negotiating her life between two cultures, American and Puerto Rican, and how this process informs her sensibilities as a writer. Her work also explores such subjects as racism and sexism in American culture, machismo and female empowerment in Puerto Rican culture, and the challenges diasporic immigrants face in a new culture. Among Ortiz Cofer's more well known essays are "The Story of My Body" and "The Myth of the Latin Woman," both reprinted in The Latin Deli.

A central theme Ortiz Cofer returns to repeatedly is language and the power of words to create and shape identities and worlds. Growing up, Ortiz Cofer's home language was Spanish. In school, she encountered English, which became her functional language and the language she wrote in. Early in her life, Ortiz Cofer realized her "main weapon in life was communication," and to survive, she would have to become fluent in the language spoken where she lived.

Ortiz Cofer believes that what it is important in life is not the event but the memory that these events produce. It was these memories that we as humans cling onto and our mind warp into how we would like to perceive these events. Ortiz Cofer tested her theory by asking both her mother and her brother to recall the same event. When both of them gave a different account of the same event, she came to the realization that a person's memory of an event is based on many other factors, such as gender, race and even emotional situation. This phenomenon became the basis of her writing. Ortiz Cofer had written many different things within her time, such as personal essays, poems, and even novels. In each of her works, she stresses the fact that this is her own rendition of the truth and that everyone remembers an event differently. In her own words, she says, “If anyone objected I assured them that it wasn't my intent to defame them or warp the truth, but to give my rendition of it. My intent was poetic rather than genealogical.”

== Major works ==
=== The Latin Deli ===
The Latin Deli is a collection of poetry, personal essays, and short fiction. These stories have one central subject, the Latinos who live within the United States. While these Latinos, while coming from different backgrounds, are all interconnected by their roots being embedded within through collective roots in Europe, Africa, and the New World. One of the major aspects of the work is that "the qualities uniformness and uniqueness are not mutually exclusive, and that the memories of the past and hopes for the future can be intertwined on a daily basis." Ortiz Cofer conveys this by using the lives of Puerto Ricans in a New Jersey barrio. This is directly parallel to her own upbringing in the United States.

=== Silent Dancing: A Partial Remembrance of a Puerto Rican Childhood ===
Silent Dancing: A Partial Remembrance of a Puerto Rican Childhood is a collection of essays and poems that detail Ortiz Cofer's childhood. She goes from her village in Puerto Rico to her life within Paterson, New Jersey. She goes over what children of military parents must face, as she did with her father being in the U.S. Navy. Like many Puerto Ricans, her father left the island in hope of having a better life. Furthermore, there is this theme of split loyalties, where Ortiz Cofer feels confused between her loyalty to the United States, the place where she grew up, and her loyalty to Puerto Rico, her own birthplace. This is a common issue with many Puerto Ricans.

In a review in The San Francisco Examiner, Carmen Vazquez wrote of Silent Dancing :

Blending poetry and prose that is clear, precise and sometimes shimmering, Cofer transforms snatches of memory her grandmother's fables, a handsome and philandering uncle's visit, a Christmas feast in Puerto Rico, the appearance of her Navy father in white uniform under a street lamp, the loneliness of an older gay man, the poignancy and passion of young lovers courting without touching — into a stream of sound, color, and words ... The straightforward, non-spectacular character, of Cofer's memoirs is refreshing ... This book is a treasure, a secret door opening onto memories locked away long ago.

=== An Island Like You: Stories of the Barrio ===
An Island Like You: Stories of the Barrio is a collection of twelve short stories following a cast of Puerto Rican teenage characters in a New Jersey barrio. The stories are written for a young adult audience. Like many of Ortiz Cofer's famous works, An Island Like You: Stories of the Barrio draws upon her upbringing as a Puerto Rican teenager in the United States. The collection was named one of the best books of the year young adults by the American Library Association in 1994 It also won the first ever Pura Belpré medal for narrative in 1996. The 12 stories take place in the same neighborhood, and often intertwine, though each has an independent plot. Some of the characters appear in more than one story, allowing the reader to see them from both their own perspective, and the perspective of another character.

In a review in The Sacramento Bee, Judy Green wrote:

Each of the 12 short stories in Judith Ortiz Cofer’s An Island Like You vibrates with the intense emotions of a young teenager on the edge of growing up. That most of the stories occur in the Puerto Rican barrio of Paterson, N.J., makes little difference because each pivots on a universal point: self-discovery, tolerance, family loyalty ... Cofer's astute eye and ear for life in El Building and on the island come naturally. Readers will find her vigorous characters keep talking long after their stories end.

=== The Line of the Sun ===
The Line of the Sun is a novel published in 1989 which tells the story of a Puerto Rican family from the late 1930s to the 1960s. A Spanish translation of the novel titled La Línea del Sol was also published in 1996. The first half of the novel follows the family's lives in Puerto Rico, and centers on the character Uncle Guzmán. The second half of the novel is narrated by Marisol, the eldest daughter of the family. In this half, the family moves from Puerto Rico to a tenement in Paterson, New Jersey, and eventually to the New Jersey suburbs. This novel is based on Ortiz Cofer's own life, but includes fictional elements as well. The novel explores the theme of cultural identity, and gives a realistic illustration of the Puerto Rican migrant experience.

Daniel Corrie, writing in The Atlanta Constitution, praised the novel:

The story's opening half unfolds on the Latino island of peasant machismo and teenage wives whose beauty is soon marred by child-bearing and hard work ... Lush with the sights, sounds and smells of this world of cane fields and coffee plantations, the novel's clean, lyrical prose often reminds the reader that the novel's author is also the author of two books of poetry ... In Paterson, the islanders are "wetbacks" who keep to El Building as though it were a country unto itself where they hang onto customs of their native land. The young narrator is doubly isolated by the influence of her aloof and protective father ... Besides being a valuable chronicle of cultures, The Line of the Sun is ... a strong portrayal of childhood and womanhood.

== List of works ==
=== Multi-genre works ===
- The Latin Deli: Prose and Poetry (1993), U of Georgia Press, ISBN 978-0820315560. Second edition: (2010), University of Georgia Press, ISBN 9780820336213
- The Year of Our Revolution: New and Selected Stories and Poems (1998), Arte Publico Press, ISBN 1558852247
- Silent Dancing: A Partial Remembrance of a Puerto Rican Childhood (1990)
- American History (1993)

=== Poetry ===
- A Love Story Beginning in Spanish (2005), University of Georgia Press, ISBN 0820327425
- Reaching for the Mainland and Selected New Poems (1995), Bilingual Press, ISBN 092753455X
- Terms of Survival (1987), Arte Publico Press, ISBN 1558850791
- Judith Speaks of the Death of Holoferness, Kalliope, ISSN 0735-7885
- Salome Remembers John the Baptist, Kalliope, ISSN 0735-7885
- What the Gypsy Said to Her Children, in "Woman of Her Word: Hispanic Women Write" (1983), Reprinted in "Making Face, Making Soul = Haciendo Caras: Creative Critical Perspectives by Feminists of Color" (1990) ISBN 1879960117

=== Prose ===
- The Line of the Sun (1989), University of Georgia Press, ISBN 0820313351

=== Works on writing ===
- Lessons from a Writer's Life: Readings and Resources for Teachers and Students (2011), co-authored by Harvey Daniels, Penny Kittle, Carol Jago, and Judith Ortiz Cofer, Heinemann, ISBN 0325031460
- Woman in Front of the Sun: On Becoming A Writer (2000), University of Georgia Press, ISBN 0820322423
- Sleeping with One Eye Open: Women Writers and the Art of Survival (1999), editor Marilyn Kallet, University of Georgia Press, ISBN 0820321532
- Conversations with the World: American Women Poets and Their Work (1998), contributor Toi Derricotte, Trilogy Books, ISBN 0962387991

=== Young adult literature ===
- If I Could Fly (2011), Farrar, Straus and Giroux, ISBN 0374335176
- Call Me Maria (2004), Scholastic, ISBN 0439385784
- The Meaning of Consuelo (2003), Farrar, Straus and Giroux, ISBN B008AFRU8W
- Riding Low on the Streets of Gold; Latino Literature for Young Adults (2003), Arte Publico Press, ISBN 1558853804
- An Island Like You: Stories of the Barrio (1995), Scholastic, ISBN 0531068978

=== Children's books ===
- The Poet Upstairs (2012), illustrated by Oscar Ortiz, Piñata Books, ISBN 1558857044
- Animal Jamboree/La Fiesta De Los Animales: Latino Folktales / Leyendas (2012), Piñata Books, ISBN 1558857435
- A Bailar!/Let's Dance (2011), illustrated by Christina Ann Rodriguez, Piñata Books, ISBN 1558856986

=== Pamphlets ===
- The Native Dancer (1995), ASIN: B00I6G9STO
- Peregrina (1986), Poets of the Foothills Art Center, Riverstone Press, ISBN 0936600063
- Latin Women Pray (1980), The Florida Arts Gazette Press, ASIN: B008A2A5GY

=== Contributions ===
- Triple Crown: Chicano, Puerto Rican, and Cuban-American Poetry (1997), Bilingual Press, ISBN 0916950719
- The Mercury Reader, A Custom Publication (2005), Pearson Custom Publishing, ISBN 053699840X
- Quixote Quarterly, Summer 1994 (Vol. 1, No. 1), Chuck Eisman, ISBN 0964219808
- The Kenyon Review, Summer / Fall 1998 (Vol. 20, No. 3/4). Kenyon College, ASIN: B001NODMH0

== See also ==
- "The Myth of the Latin Woman"
- List of Puerto Rican writers
- List of Puerto Ricans
- Puerto Rican literature
