= Mercer University Press =

University press in Macon, Georgia

- Parent company: Mercer University
- Founded: 1979
- Country of origin: United States
- Headquarters location: Macon, Georgia
- Publication types: Books
- Official website: www.mupress.org

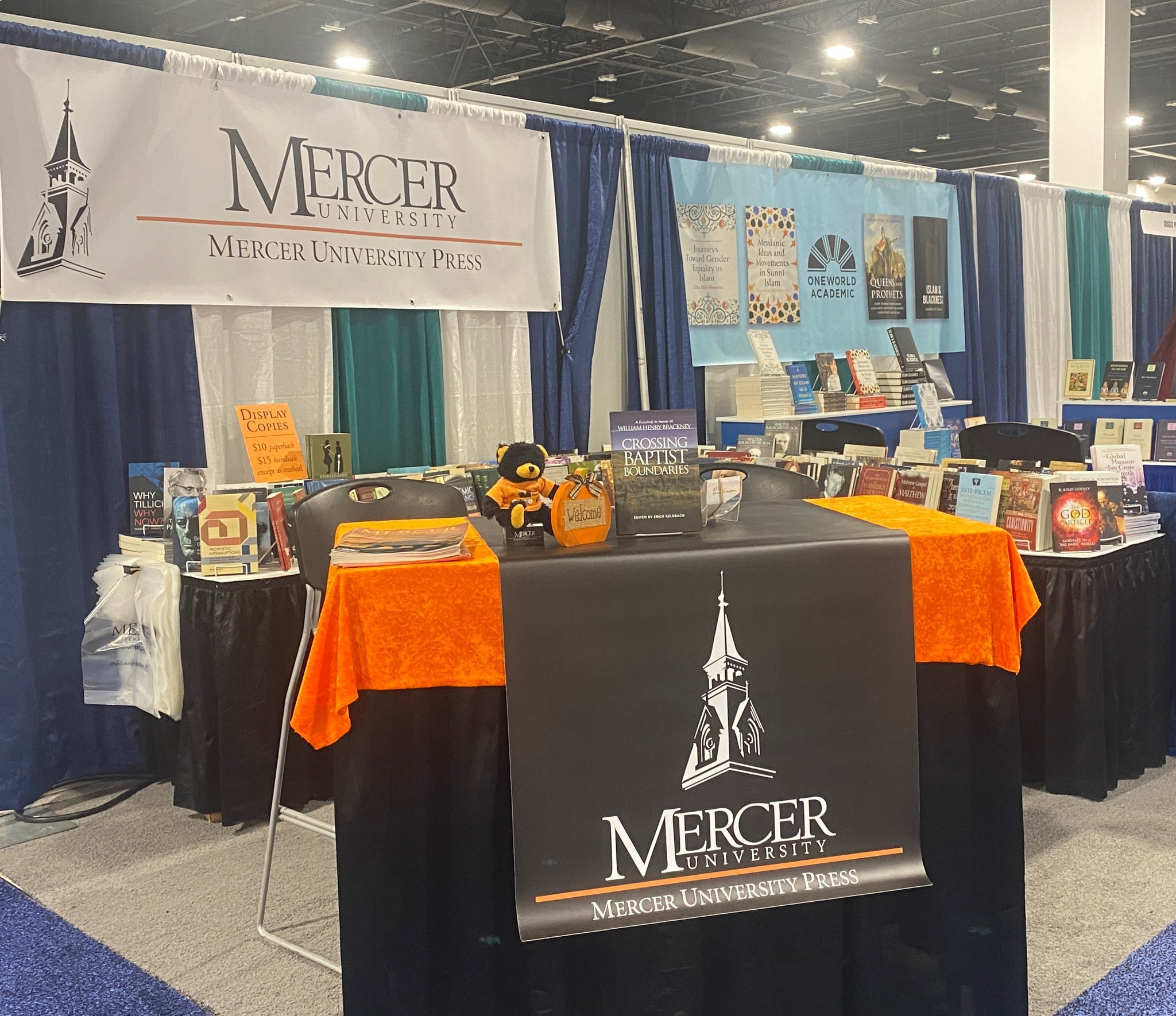

Mercer University Press, established in 1979, is a publisher that is part of Mercer University. Mercer University Press has published more than 1,600 books, releasing 35-40 titles annually with a 5-person staff.

Mercer is the only Baptist-related institution with an active continuous full-time publishing program over the past thirty years.

In 2019, Gov. Brian Kemp recognized Mercer University Press as a recipient of the eighth annual Governor's Awards for the Arts and Humanities.

Mercer University Press is a member of the Association of University Presses and The Green Press Initiative.

Mercer University Press awards the Ferrol Sams Award for Fiction annually. It is "given to the best manuscript that speaks to the human condition in a Southern context. This category includes both novels and short stories.

== Active scholar series published by Mercer University Press ==
- America's Historically Black Colleges and Universities Series
- Voices of the African Diaspora Series
- The James N. Griffith Endowed Series in Baptist Studies
- Baptists in Early North America Series
- Perspectives on Baptist Identities Series
- Early English Baptist Texts Series
- Mercer Commentary on the Bible Series
- Sports and Religion Series
- Food and the American South Series
- Music and the American South Series
- Carson McCullers Series
- Flannery O’Connor Series
- A.V. Elliott Conference Series
- Mercer Paul Tillich Series
- Mercer Kierkegaard Series
- International Kierkegaard Commentary Series
- The Melungeons Series
- State Narratives of the Civil War Series
- Mercer University Ocmulgee Series
- Reprint of Scholarly Excellency
- Walter Rauschenbusch Series

== Notable authors that Mercer University Press has published ==
James Dickey

- Death, and the Day's Light: Poems. Mercer University Press. 2015 ISBN 9780881465198

Samuel Pickering

- A Comfortable Boy: A Memoir]. Mercer University Press. 2010 ISBN 9780881461824
- Walden Mercer University Press. 2011 ISBN 9780881462319
- A Tramp's Wallet. Mercer University Press. 2011 ISBN 9780881462357
- The Splendour Falls. Mercer University Press. 2013 ISBN 9780881464498
- Parade's End: Essays. Mercer University Press. 2018. ISBN 9780881466652

President Jimmy Carter

- The Craftsmanship of Jimmy Carter. Mercer University Press. 2017. ISBN 9780881466447
- The Paintings of Jimmy Carter. Mercer University Press. 2018. ISBN 9780881466881

Terry Kay

- The Book of Marie. Mercer University Press. 2007. ISBN 9780881460827
- Bogmeadow's Wish. Mercer University Press. 2011. ISBN 9780881462302
- The Greats of Cuttercane]. Mercer University Press. 2011. ISBN 9780881462494
- The Seventh Mirror. Mercer University Press. 2013 ISBN 9780881464528
- Song of the Vagabond Bird. Mercer University Press. 2014 ISBN 9780881464818
- The King Who Made Paper Flowers. Mercer University Press. 2020 ISBN 9780881467727
- The Forever Wish of Middy Sweet]. Mercer University Press. 2020 ISBN 9780881467536

Bill Curry

- Ten Men You Meet in the Huddle: Lessons from a Football Life, Revised. Mercer University Press. 2023 ISBN 9780881468946

Mary Ann Harris Gay

- Life in Dixie during the war. Mercer University Press. 2013. ISBN 9780865547490

Cathryn Hankla

- Galaxies: Poems. Mercer University Press. 2017. ISBN 9780881466164
- Lost Places: On Losing and Finding Home. Mercer University Press. 2018. ISBN 9780881466485
- Not Xanadu: Poems. Mercer University Press. 2022. ISBN 9780881468328
- Immortal Stuff: Prose Poems. Mercer University Press. 2023 ISBN 9780881468748

Paul Hornsby

- Fix It In the Mix: A Memoir. Mercer University Press. 2021 ISBN 9780881467819

Don Reid of The Statler Brothers

- The Music of The Statler Brothers: An Anthology. Mercer University Press. 2021 ISBN 9780881467512
- Life Lessons. Mercer University Press. 2021. ISBN 9780881467963
- Piano Days: A Novel. Mercer University Press. 2022. ISBN 9780881468694

Willie Perkins, tour manager for The Allman Brothers Band

- No Saints, No Saviors: My Years With The Allman Brothers Band. Mercer University Press. 2010. ISBN 9780865549678
- The Allman Brothers Band Classic Memorabilia, 1969-1976. Mercer University Press. 2015. ISBN 9780881465471
- Diary of a Rock and Roll Tour Manager: 2,190 Days and Nights with the South's Premier Rock Band. Mercer University Press. 2022. ISBN 9780881468465

William Rawlings

- A Killing on Ring Jaw Bluff: The Great Recession and the Death of Small Town Georgia. Mercer University Press. 2013. ISBN 9780881464313
- The Strange Journey of the Confederate Constitution: And Other Stories from Georgia's Historical Past. Mercer University Press. 2017 ISBN 9780881466263
- The Second Coming of the Invisible Empire: The Ku Klux Klan of the 1920s. Mercer University Press. 2017. ISBN 9780881466430
- The Girl with Kaleidoscope Eyes: A Novel. Mercer University Press. 2019. ISBN 9780881467130
- Six Inches Deeper: The Disappearance of Hellen Hanks. Mercer University Press. 2020. ISBN 9780881467338
- Lighthouses of the Georgia Coast. Mercer University Press. 2021. ISBN 9780881467758
- The Columbus Stocking Strangler: The True Crime story of serial killer Carlton Gary Mercer University Press. 2022. ISBN 9780881468915

News Anchor at WSB-TV in Atlanta, Georgia John Pruitt

- Tell it True. Mercer University Press. 2022. ISBN 9780881468670

Timothy H. Scherman

- Elizabeth Oakes Smith: Selected Writings, Volume I: Emergence and Fame, 1831-1849. Mercer University Press. 2023. ISBN 9780881468854

== See also ==
- List of English-language book publishing companies
- List of university presses
