= Bill Shipp =

American journalist (1933–2023)

William R. Shipp (August 16, 1933 – July 9, 2023) was an American author, reporter, editor, and columnist who covered Southern politics and government for more than five decades.

== Career ==
On October 8, 1953, while serving as editor of the University of Georgia's student newspaper – The Red & Black – he wrote a column that angered many in power by saying the university was misguided to deny admission to Horace Ward just because he was black. "There's absolutely no logic in excluding the Negro from the white man's way of life, especially at a university," Shipp wrote. He was fired from the newspaper over the column, and "encouraged" to leave the campus, which he did, joining the U.S. Army and serving West Germany. He met his wife there and brought her back with him.

After Shipp came home from military service in 1956, he worked full-time at the Atlanta Constitution editing and writing, during which time over the next 30 years he covered the civil rights movement, along with the early days of the space program, numerous political campaigns, and breaking stories all over the world. He also was the first to break the news that Jimmy Carter was running for president. As a writer with the Atlanta Constitution and then as the independent publisher of Bill Shipp's Georgia, Shipp covered the ins and outs of Georgia politics for over 50 years.

Shipp served as associate editor of Georgia Trend Magazine. He wrote a twice-weekly column that appeared in more than sixty Georgia newspapers. Shipp was a regular panelist on The Georgia Gang, a weekly commentary program on news and politics which appeared on WAGA-TV, Channel 5.

== Books ==
In 1981 Shipp wrote Murder at Broad River Bridge: The Slaying of Lemuel Penn by Members of the Ku Klux Klan, a nonfiction account of the 1964 murder of Lemuel Penn, a black lieutenant colonel in the army reserves who, on his way home to Washington, D.C., was shot to death near the Oglethorpe-Madison county line by members of the Athens Ku Klux Klan.

In 1997 Shipp published The Ape-Slayer and Other Snapshots, a collection of more than 50 essays and columns on subjects both personal and political.

== Awards ==
The Georgia Magazine Association named Shipp "best serious columnist" for his essays in Atlanta Magazine and in 1994 also gave him their "Best Column/Department" award.

The Georgia Writers Hall of Fame at the University of Georgia has included Shipp as an honoree.

In 2013 Shipp was inducted into the Atlanta Press Club Hall of Fame.

== Personal life and death ==
Shipp was born August 16, 1933, in Marietta, Georgia. He married Renate F. Reinelt of Heidelberg, Germany. They had a son and two daughters.

Shipp's modest 80th birthday party in the basement of a Smyrna, Georgia bank drew four former Georgia governors, former U. S. Senator Max Cleland, Chief Justice Harris Hines of the Georgia Supreme Court, and a host of other notable guests. Shipp died on July 9, 2023, at age 89.
