= Jim Harrison (artist and writer) =

American painter (1936–2016)

- Born: January 12, 1936; Leslie, Georgia, U.S.
- Died: June 18, 2016 (aged 80); Denmark, South Carolina, U.S.
- Education: University of South Carolina
- Known for: Paintings and writings chronicling early 20th-century rural life
- Spouse: Margaret Harrison

Jim Harrison (January 12, 1936 – June 18, 2016) was an American artist and writer whose work is known for chronicling earlier twentieth-century rural life. Harrison's paintings are featured in personal and corporate art collections across the United States, and he had successful one-man shows at the Hammer Galleries in New York City and the Conacher Gallery in San Francisco.

Harrison's paintings are featured in personal and corporate art collections across the country including The Coca-Cola Company in Atlanta, Georgia; The Maytag Corporation in Newton, Iowa; Philip Morris Company in New York, New York; The Leo Burnett Company in Chicago, Illinois; and the Augusta National Golf Club in Augusta, Georgia.

== Biography ==
=== Early life and education ===
Jim Harrison was born in his grandmother's house in Leslie, Georgia, on January 12, 1936. When he was six years old, his father took a job with American Telephone and Telegraph Company, and his mother worked as a Southern Bell switchboard operator in Denmark, South Carolina.

At Denmark High School Harrison worked on the annual staff, school newspaper, and class bulletin boards. During summer vacations, Harrison took a job as an assistant to a seventy-year-old sign painter, J. J. Cornforth. The elderly gentleman taught him how to letter, and for several summers the two traveled the rural areas around Denmark painting Coca-Cola bulletins on the sides of barns and country stores. Harrison marks this time as what sparked his interest in art. His mother also pushed him to pursue his interests in art.

After high school graduation, Harrison entered the University of South Carolina where he pursued a dual major in art and physical education, graduating in 1958.

=== Early career ===
In 1960, Harrison began an eleven-year high school coaching career, which included working for the American League baseball team the Cleveland Indians as a part-time talent scout from 1965 through 1970. At three schools he coached football, girls' basketball, and baseball, and he never experienced a losing season as a head coach. In 1970, he declined an offer to join the Furman University football coaching staff and returned to his hometown of Denmark, South Carolina, to pursue a career as an artist.

=== Art career ===
In 1972, Harrison had no knowledge of the art market, but went to New York City for the fall Greenwich Village sidewalk art show. His only sale during the three-week show was an $85 original, and it cost him $800 in expenses. After several years, however, he had ten galleries selling his originals. He published his first limited edition print, Coastal Dunes, in 1973 through Frame House Gallery of Louisville, Kentucky. In 1975, Frame House released its first Harrison print, Rural Americana, through the publisher's network of 600 dealers. Many of his prints have appreciated up to 3,000 percent of their original value.

He was a licensee of The Coca-Cola Company for more than ten years and produced The Coca-Cola Calendar for collectors each year. He first painted the company's trademark on the side of an old barn as the 14-year-old apprentice of J. J. Cornforth. His later paintings depict the rural life of the 20th-century Americans, including images of churches, bridges, and buildings.

In addition to his artwork, Harrison was the author or illustrator of several books including Pathway to a Southern Coast, Country Stores, American Christmas, The Passing: Perspective of Rural America, Jim Harrison Cookbook: Southern Cooking and Southern Stories, and Jim Harrison, His World Remembered. He worked on a book on the Sabal palmetto for the University of South Carolina Press which was to be released in 2012.

=== Death ===
Jim Harrison was found dead in his office after suffering from a heart attack on June 18, 2016.

== Awards and honors ==
Harrison was named by the Governor of Kentucky to the Honorable Order of Kentucky Colonels, having the park in Denmark named in his honor, and being named a Distinguished Adjunct Professor at the University of South Carolina Aiken. He served on the boards of South Carolina National Bank and Security Federal Bank, on the board of Vorhees College and Denmark Technical College, and on the board of the Denmark Downtown Development Association. Also, being a strong advocate for the mentally ill, he served on the board of the governor's legislative council for mental health and intellectual disability.

In 2008, he was honored by former South Carolina governor Mark Sanford with the Order of the Palmetto Award for his service as a citizen of the state. Also in June 2008, he was honored for his contributions to art and the State of South Carolina by the South Carolina House of Representatives. Citing Harrison as a "nationally and internationally acclaimed artist" and as "one of the Palmetto State's Chief Art Treasures", the resolution congratulated Harrison on his more than 38 years as a successful artist and on the occasion of his 20th anniversary of Jim Harrison Gallery in Denmark, SC. In May 2010, Harrison was awarded an Honorary Doctorate of Fine Arts by University of South Carolina president Dr. Harris Pastides. The honor was bestowed for Harrison's work as a professional artist, the prestige he had brought to the University and the state, and his contributions to charitable organizations.

== Bibliography ==
- Dickey, Gary C. (1982). Jim Harrison, His World Remembered. Houston, Texas: American Masters Foundation. — illustrated by Harrison
- Blackwelder, Jerry (2009) [1986]. Pathways to a Southern Coast. Columbia, South Carolina: University of South Carolina Press. —lllustrated by Harrison
- Sams, Ferrol (1988). The Passing: Perspectives of Rural America. Atlanta, Georgia: Longstreet Press, Inc. — illustrated by Harrison
- — (1993). Country Stores. Atlanta, Georgia: Longstreet Press, Inc.
- — (1994). American Christmas. Longstreet Press, Inc.
- — (2011). Jim Harrison Cookbook: Southern Cooking & Southern Stories. Orangeburg, South Carolina: Sun Printing.
- — (2012). The Palmetto and Its South Carolina Home. Columbia, South Carolina: University of South Carolina Press. ISBN 978-1611170498.
