= To Dance with the White Dog =

- Genre: Drama
- Written by: Terry Kay; Susan Cooper
- Starring: Hume Cronyn; Jessica Tandy; Christine Baranski
- Theme music composer: Gerald Gouriet
- Country of origin: United States
- Original language: English

Production
- Executive producers: Patricia Clifford; Richard Welsh
- Producers: Patricia Clifford; Glenn Jordan
- Production locations: Americus, Georgia; Jimmy Carter National Historic Site
- Cinematography: Neil Roach
- Editor: Bill Blunden
- Running time: 100 minutes
- Production companies: Signboard Hill Productions, Patricia Clifford Productions (in association with) Hallmark Hall of Fame Productions

Original release
- Network: CBS
- Release: December 5, 1993

To Dance with the White Dog is a 1990 novel by Georgia author Terry Kay, based on the experiences of his father.

== Plot summary ==
Sam Peek happily resides in Hart County, Georgia, as a pecan farmer and local celebrity featured in many gardening/horticultural magazines. His wife Cora and he are both in their 80s, and seven years after celebrating their 50th wedding anniversary, Cora dies of a heart attack. Sam and his family are deeply grieved over this, and his daughters begin to obsess over his safety and his life.

Not long after Cora's death, a mysterious white dog that only Sam can see appears near the house. He thinks it is just a stray, but daughters Kate, Carrie, and his other children do not see it and think he is going crazy. Sam goes on a car trip in his weathered truck to a school reunion, keeping it a secret from the children. After a series of events, the family and other people begin to see the white dog, but never hear her bark. Shortly before Sam's death, the dog disappears, and the dog is thought to have been Cora in another form.

== Film adaptation ==
The novel was adapted into a Hallmark Hall of Fame television movie starring Hume Cronyn as Sam Peek and Jessica Tandy as Cora. It was directed by Glenn Jordan and was filmed on location in Georgia. The movie premiered December 5, 1993, on CBS, and was nominated for many awards including seven Primetime Emmy Awards. Hume Cronyn won an Emmy award for his performance. Nominations were given to lead actress Jessica Tandy, directing (Glenn Jordan), Sound Mixing, Sound Editing and Film Editing,

=== Cast ===
- Hume Cronyn as Sam Peek
- Jessica Tandy as Cora
- Christine Baranski as Kate
- Amy Wright as Carrie
- Frank Whaley as James
- Harley Cross as Bobby
- Esther Rolle as Neelie
- Lane Bradbury as Mildred Cook
- Ed Grady as Herman Morris
