= William A. Sessions =

American poet

William A. Sessions (August 4, 1928 – August 12, 2016) was an American author, biographer and professor emeritus of English at Georgia State University, known for his writings about and relationship with Flannery O'Connor. After meeting her when they were both working for the Archdiocese of Atlanta's newspaper, Sessions corresponded with, and frequently visited, O'Connor, and is mentioned in many of her letters as the "absurd" or "breathless" Billy. The two corresponded when O'Connor was between the ages of 20 and 22. Sessions' articles on O'Connor have appeared in the Washington and Lee University Review, the National Catholic Reporter and Studies in Short Fiction. He is also the founding editor of the Carolina Quarterly and Studies in the Literary Imagination. Awards Sessions has received include the Nikos Kazantzakis Medal from Greece, as well as an honorary degree from Coastal Carolina University. He is also a poet, and his poetry has been published in The Southern Review, The Georgia Review, and The Chattahoochee Review. Sessions also discovered one of O'Connor's private journals in her archives; the entries in the journal were published by Farrar, Straus and Giroux as A Prayer Journal in November 2013.
