= Sanjena Sathian =

American novelist

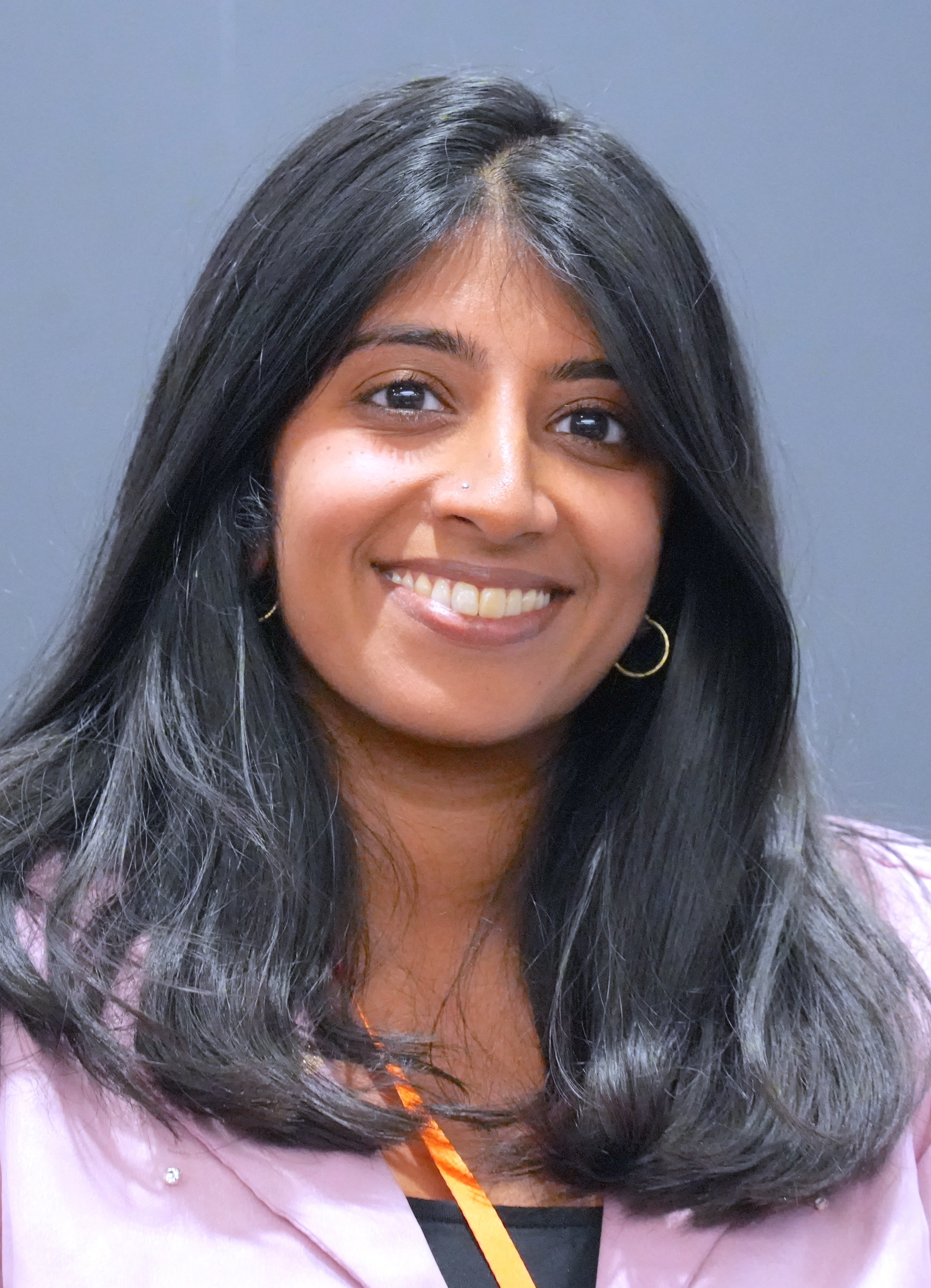
- Sanjena Sathian at the 2025 Los Angeles Times Festival of Books
- Born: Sanjena Anshu Sathian; 1991 or 1992 (age 34–35)
- Education: The Westminster Schools
- Alma mater: Yale University (BA); Iowa Writers' Workshop (MFA)
- Occupations: Novelist, journalist
- Writing career
- Genre: Magical realism
- Notable work: Gold Diggers (2021)
- Website: sanjenasathian.com

Sanjena Anshu Sathian is an American novelist and journalist. Her debut novel, Gold Diggers, was published by Penguin Press in 2021. Her second novel, Goddess Complex, was published in 2025.

== Early life and education ==
Sathian was raised in Georgia by a Malayali father and Kannadiga mother, both immigrants from South India. She grew up in metro Atlanta and attended The Westminster Schools. In high school, she competed in policy debate, winning the national championship as a senior. She attended Yale College, graduating in 2013 with a B.A. in English. She was a recipient of a 2017 Paul & Daisy Soros Fellowship for New Americans. The fellowship supported her studies at the Iowa Writers' Workshop, from which she graduated in 2019 with an MFA in creative writing.

== Career ==
After graduating from college, Sathian worked as a technology journalist in San Francisco before moving to Mumbai to work as a foreign correspondent.

Sathian's debut novel, Gold Diggers, was published by Penguin Press on April 6, 2021. It was sold to Penguin Press after a seven-way auction. Gold Diggers is a magical realism novel that follows Neil Narayan, a second-generation Indian teenager from the suburbs of Atlanta. It is tale of gold heists and alchemy. In February 2021, it was announced that the novel is being adapted into a television series by Mindy Kaling's production company Kaling International. Sathian will be a co-writer and co-executive producer of the adaptation, while Kaling and Howard Klein will be its executive producers. Ron Charles of The Washington Post praised the novel's "effervescent social satire" and "astonishing cultural richness", calling it an "invaluable new alloy of American literature." Charles also compared it to the works of Aimee Bender, Karen Russell and Colson Whitehead. Publishers Weekly praised Sathian's "sharp" characterization, while Kirkus Reviews praised her "page-turner" prose. The New Yorker wrote that it "deftly weaves together magic and history to produce a compelling coming-of-age story." The novel was selected for The Washington Post's "10 Best Books of 2021" list. On April 13, 2023, Sanjena was awarded the biennial Townsend Prize for Fiction for Gold Diggers.

Sathian's sophomore novel, Goddess Complex, was published by Penguin Press on March 11, 2025.

Sathian's short stories have appeared in Boulevard, The Masters Review, Joyland, and Salt Hill. She has written nonfiction pieces, including for The New York Times, The New Yorker, The Boston Globe, the San Francisco Chronicle, Food & Wine, The Juggernaut, The Millions, and OZY.

== Works ==
=== Novels ===
- Gold Diggers: A Novel. New York: Penguin Press. April 6, 2021. ISBN 978-1-984882-03-5.
- Goddess Complex: A Novel. New York: Penguin Press. March 11, 2025. ISBN 978-0-593489-77-2.

=== Short stories ===
- "Neighbors". Joyland. May 2018.
- "New America". Boulevard. No. 100. Fall 2018.
- "Catfishing in America". Salt Hill. Vol. 42. February 2019.
- "Narada's Ears". The Masters Review. June 2019.
- "Mr. Ashok's Monument". Conjunctions. Spring 2021.
- "The Missing Limousine". The Atlantic. September 28, 2021.
- "How I Talk to My Mother". Southern Humanities Review. Vol. 55, no. 2. Summer 2022.
- "Ecstacy". Guernica Magazine. September 2026

=== Selected articles ===
- ""Family Karma" Might Be a Breakthrough for Desis on TV". The New Yorker. March 10, 2020.
- "Time to end the Asian American 'model minority' story". San Francisco Chronicle. June 29, 2020.
- "We Need to Talk About 'Indian Matchmaking'". The New York Times. August 5, 2020.
- "Indian Americans want to claim Kamala Harris as ours. It's a trap". The Washington Post. August 14, 2020.
- "Sanjena Sathian: After the Atlanta shooting, all I see is the fragility of our belonging". Los Angeles Times. March 18, 2021.
- "How the Pressure of the Model Minority Myth Restricts Our Imagination—and Our Freedom". Time. April 9, 2021.
- "Good Immigrant Novels". The Drift. No. 4. May 6, 2021.
- "Room for More". The Drift. No. 7. June 14, 2022.
