= The Heart of a Distant Forest =

1984 novel by Philip Lee Williams

- First edition
- Author: Philip Lee Williams
- Language: English
- Genre: Fiction
- Publisher: W.W. Norton & Co.
- Publication date: 1984
- Publication place: United States
- Media type: Print (hardcover)
- Pages: 221
- ISBN: 0-8203-2790-5

The Heart of a Distant Forest (1984) was the first novel published by U.S. author Philip Lee Williams. It remains in print 25 years after publication.

It was named by the Georgia Center for the Book as one of 25 "Books All Georgians Should Read" in 2010.

== Plot summary ==
Retired junior college history professor Andrew Lachlan has returned to his family home on a lake in north central Georgia to spend the last year of his life. Diagnosed with a terminal disease, he has decided to forego life-extending treatments so he can focus on learning what he feels he does not yet know about the world. With strong interests in Native American history and the natural world, he begins a journal that chronicles his last year.

He lives alone, his wife have died some time before, and he looks forward to solitude, but a young country boy, Willie Sullivan, comes into his life. Willie's world is cramped and difficult, and he brings to Andrew a kind of learning he's never had before. At the same time, Andrew begins to teach Willie about the life beyond Shadow Pond, where Andrew lives.

Andrew also reconnects with Callie McKenzie, a woman he loved years earlier and who is now a widow herself. Each begins to see in the other reflections of the life they once led. As Andrew's life draws toward its inevitable end, he begins to find the edge of a new transcendence and an understanding of how generations learn and pass on the best of what they know and feel.

== Major themes ==
The Heart of a Distant Forest draws its title from the James Dickey poem "The Lifeguard," and like that poem the novel is about courageous but failed attempts to save others.1 Yet in the novel, the salvation is not literal as it is in the poem. Unwittingly, Willie and Andrew are trying to save each other, and a cast of supporting characters in the nearby small town of Branton intensifies the search of each.

Andrew is obsessed with learning the names of flora and fauna, and he wants to understand the relationship to the Earth of Native Americans, whom he believes have undergone nothing less than genocide at the hands of white Americans. Andrew also tries to unravel the foundations of his religious faith and to come to some reconciliation with a God that he feels has let him down at times.

While Willie sees the necessity for learning about the world beyond his mere physical experience of it, he knows intuitively that his world is one of physical, not intellectual intimacy. As he comes to understand how Andrew sees the world, Andrew in turns begins to understand the value of Willie's inevitable approach.

In the end, as Andrew prepares to pass from the Earth, he learns the complexity that everyone must face squarely to understand the meaning of a life's time.2

== Literary context ==
Philip Lee Williams had written two apprentice works before he came to write The Heart of a Distant Forest beginning on May 1, 1980, and finishing it that autumn. Though he began as a poet and considered himself a poet only for years, he wrote an experimental novella called Fizz in 1972 and in 1978 a full-length novel, Let Us Have Madness. Thought the manuscripts of both are extant, neither will be published, according to Williams's wishes.

Williams decided to give the novel form one more try and to that end, he made a list of all his then-current passions, and in that late spring of 1980 typed the novel's first line: "Morning is rising in silence."

== Biographical context ==
Williams began writing poetry seriously at age 16 and was publishing by the time he was 19. He had never really considered writing fiction until urged to do so by his wife.

Williams wanted to write a book that would dig deep into his own personal ideas and conflicts. Always interested in the elderly, Williams knew soon that the book's narrator would be an old man.

After two failed attempts to write a novel, Williams found a new focus with The Heart of a Distant Forest, and it launched his career.3

== Awards and honors ==
Townsend Prize for Fiction, 1986

== Editions ==
Hardcover, W. W. Norton & Co., 1984 Mass-market softcover, Ballantine, 1985 British edition, John Curley & Assoc, 1986 Swedish translation as Djupt I En Fjarren Skog, Raben & Sjogren, 1988; Trade paperback, Peachtree Southern Classics, 1991 Trade paperback, University of Georgia Press, 2005
