= Philip Lee Williams =

American poet and novelist

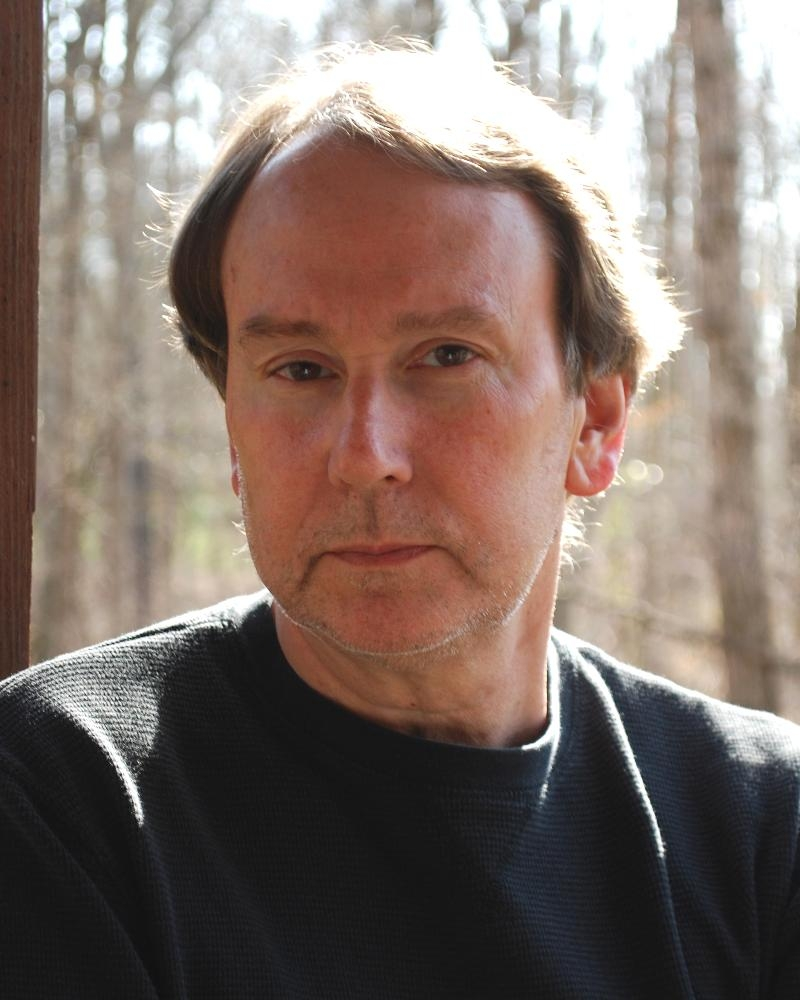
- Philip Lee Williams
- Born: January 30, 1950 (age 76); Athens, Georgia, U.S.
- Education: AB 1972; University of Georgia
- Occupations: Novelist; journalist; poet; film-maker; essayist; composer
- Website: www.philipleewilliams.com

Philip Lee Williams (born January 30, 1950) is an American novelist, poet, and essayist noted for his explorations of the natural world, intense human relationships, and aging. A native of Athens, Georgia, he grew up in the nearby town of Madison. He is the winner of many literary awards for his 21 published books, including the 2004 Michael Shaara Prize for his novel A Distant Flame (St. Martin's), an examination of southerners who were against the Confederacy’s position in the American Civil War. He is also a winner of the Townsend Prize for Fiction for his novel The Heart of a Distant Forest, and has been named Georgia Author of the Year four times. In 2007, he was recipient of a Georgia Governor's Award in the Humanities. Williams's The Divine Comics: A Vaudeville Show in Three Acts, a 1000-page re-imagining of Dante's magnum opus, was published in the fall of 2011. His latest novels are Emerson's Brother (2012) and Far Beyond the Gates (2020) from Mercer University Press.

== Biography ==
Philip Lee Williams was born in 1950, one of three children of Ruth Sisk Williams (1924–2008) and Marshall Woodson Williams (1922– ). He, his parents, and his older brother John Mark Williams (b. 1948), moved to Madison, Georgia, in 1953, where Marshall Williams had accepted a job as a chemistry teacher at Morgan County High School. Williams also has a sister, Laura Jane Williams Kuncaitis, born in 1959.

Williams began his creative work by composing music and writing poetry while still in his teens. He graduated from Morgan County High School in 1968 and from the University of Georgia in 1972 with a degree in journalism and minors in history and English. In 1972, he married Linda Rowley. They have two grown children and four grandchildren.

He finished more than half of his master's degree in English at the University of Georgia before sustaining a serious back injury in 1974. After that, he spent 13 years as an award-winning journalist before becoming a science writer at his alma mater in 1985. As a journalist he worked for The Clayton Tribune (Clayton, Ga.), the Athens Daily News (Athens, Ga.), The Madisonian (Madison, Ga.), and The Athens Observer (Athens, Ga.)

Williams retired in 2010 from the University of Georgia, where he was a writer and taught creative writing.

In 2010, Williams was inducted into the Georgia Writers Hall of Fame, alongside Flannery O'Connor, Martin Luther King Jr., James Dickey, and fellow University of Georgia graduate Natasha Trethewey. In addition, he is a recipient of the Georgia Writers Association Lifetime Achievement Award.

== Novels ==
Williams is best known for his work as a novelist. Of his 21 published books, 13 are novels.

His first novel, The Heart of a Distant Forest (W.W. Norton, 1984) is the story of a retired junior college history professor who has returned to his home place on a pond in north central Georgia to spend the last year of his life. The book won the Townsend Prize for fiction in 1986 and has subsequently come out in editions from Ballantine Books, Peachtree Publishers, and the University of Georgia Press. It was also translated into Swedish and published in a large-print format.

Williams's second novel, All the Western Stars (Peachtree Publishers, 1988) is the story of two old men who run away from a rest home to become cowboys on a ranch in Texas. This book also came out in an edition from Ballantine and was translated into German. Richard Zanuck and David Brown optioned the book for MGM as a film project, though it was never put into production there. (MGM hired Williams to write one version of the screenplay.) Instead, the project was picked up by Rysher Entertainment, where it was greenlighted, with Jack Lemmon and James Garner to star. When Lemmon withdrew from the project, the film was shelved and has yet to be made.

Subsequent novels include:

- Slow Dance in Autumn (Peachtree Publishers, 1988)
- The Song of Daniel (Peachtree Publishers, 1989)
- Perfect Timing (Peachtree Publishers, 1991)
- Final Heat (Turtle Bay Books/Random House, 1992)
- Blue Crystal (Grove Press, 1993)
- The True and Authentic History of Jenny Dorset (Longstreet Press, 1997)
- A Distant Flame (Thomas Dunne Books/St. Martin's, 2004)
- The Campfire Boys (Mercer University Press, 2009)
- The Divine Comics: A Vaudeville Show in Three Acts (Mercer University Press, 2011)
- Emerson's Brother (Mercer University Press, 2012)
- Far Beyond the Gates (Mercer University Press, 2020)

Slow Dance in Autumn was translated into Japanese, and Final Heat into German and French. Perfect Timing was optioned for film by director Ron Howard and was a Literary Guild selection. Actress Meg Ryan optioned an unpublished novel of Williams's for her production company.

== Poetry ==
Williams began his creative career as a poet and started publishing in small magazines while he was still an undergraduate. He has published poetry in more than 40 magazines and continues in such magazines as Poetry, Karamu, and the Kentucky Poetry Review..

Williams has published poetry in journals and magazines for decades. His poetry books include:

- Elegies for the Water (Mercer University Press, 2009)
- The Flower Seeker, An Epic Poem of William Bartram (Mercer University Press, 2010)
- The Color of All Things: 99 Love Poems (Mercer University Press, 2015)
- Eden's Last Horizon (Mercer University Press, 2022)

== Non-fiction writing ==
In addition to his work as a novelist, Philip Lee Williams has published four books of creative non-fiction:

- The Silent Stars Go By (Hill Street Press, 1998)
- Crossing Wildcat Ridge: A Memoir of Nature and Healing (University of Georgia Press, 1999)
- In the Morning: Reflections from First Light (Mercer University Press, 2005)
- It is Written: My Life in Letters (Mercer University Press, 2014)

== Other creative work ==
Williams is also a documentary film-maker whose films have won awards from the New York Film Festival, the Columbus (Ohio) Film Festival, and the Telly Awards. Among the documentaries he has written and co-produced are Hugh Kenner: A Modern Master and Eugene Odum: An Ecologist’s Life. His work has also appeared in numerous anthologies.

A composer, Williams has to his credit 18 symphonies, chamber works, concerti, and much incidental and church music. Only a small amount of this has been performed in public as Williams has preferred to keep his output private. He is also an accomplished visual artist.

== Recent awards ==
- The Campfire Boys - 2010 Georgia Author of the Year Award (Novel)
- The Flower Seeker, An Epic Poem of William Bartram, Book of the Year, Books and Culture magazine; also Georgia Author of the Year award (Poetry)
