= Mary Hood =

American novelist

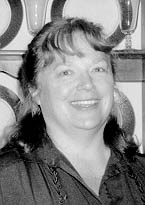
- Born: September 16, 1946 (age 80); Brunswick, Georgia, U.S.
- Education: Georgia State University
- Occupations: Novelist; short story writer; writer
- Writing career
- Genre: Southern literature
- Notable work: How Far She Went

Mary Hood (born September 16, 1946) is a fiction writer of predominantly Southern literature, who has authored three short story collections – How Far She Went, And Venus is Blue and A Clear View of the Southern Sky – two novellas – And Venus is Blue (also the title of her second short story collection) and Seam Busters – and a novel, Familiar Heat. She also regularly publishes essays and reviews in literary and popular magazines.

Hood was inducted into the Georgia Writers Hall of Fame in 2014.

== Family and home ==
Mary Hood was born in Brunswick, Georgia, on September 16, 1946, to William Charles Hood and Mary Adella Katherine Rogers Hood.

Hood's father was an aircraft worker, originally from Manhattan, New York. Her mother was a Latin teacher, originally from rural Cherokee County, Georgia. The two met during World War II at a United Service Organizations event in Brunswick.

At the age of two, Hood and her family moved from coastal Brunswick to White, Georgia, where they briefly lived with her maternal grandfather, Claude Montgomery Rogers, who was a Methodist minister. Shortly thereafter, the family moved to Douglas County, and, subsequently, multiple other places across rural north and south Georgia.

Hood graduated from Worth County High School in Sylvester, Georgia, and then moved to Clayton County just outside Atlanta, where she commuted back and forth to Georgia State University.

After obtaining a degree in Spanish and working for two years as a librarian in Douglasville, Georgia, Hood bought land and moved to Cherokee County near Woodstock, Georgia.

Hood lived in Woodstock (in the small lake community of Little Victoria on the banks of Lake Allatoona) for 30 years, where she witnessed the small, rural town turn into a bedroom community for burgeoning Atlanta – much of which is fictionally chronicled in her short story collection And Venus is Blue.

In the early 2000s, she left the now metro-Atlanta-Woodstock area for the quiet countryside of Jackson County, Georgia, where she currently resides.

== Awards ==
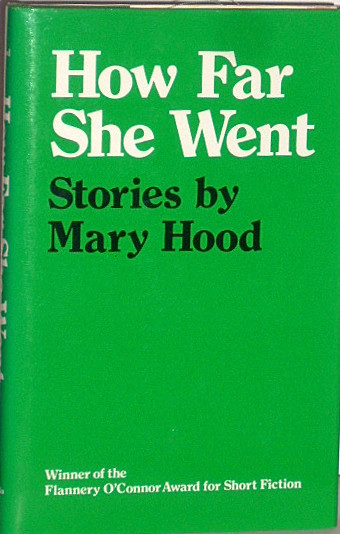
1984 Edition Hardback of How Far She Went

- Flannery O'Connor Award for Short Fiction (1984) (How Far She Went)
- The Southern Review /Louisiana State University Short Fiction Award (1984)(How Far She Went)
- National Magazine Award in fiction (1986) "Something Good for Ginnie"
- Lillian Smith Book Award (1987) (And Venus is Blue)
- Dixie Council of Authors and Journalists Author-of-the-Year Award (1987)(And Venus is Blue)
- Townsend Prize for Fiction (1988)(And Venus is Blue)
- Whiting Award (1994)
- Robert Penn Warren Award (2001)
- Townsend Prize for Fiction (2016)(A Clear View of the Southern Sky)

== Career ==
In 1996, she held the Grisham Chair (after John Grisham) at the University of Mississippi, Oxford. She was the first writer-in-residence at Berry College in 1997–1998, Reinhardt University in 2001 and Oxford College of Emory University in 2009. Additionally, she was the visiting writer at Centre College in Kentucky in 1999 and has taught classes at the University of Georgia. In the spring of 2010, she held the Ferrol Sams Distinguished Chair of English at Mercer University.

Kennesaw State University in Georgia named her the Writer of the Decade in honor of the tenth anniversary of the Contemporary Literature and Writing Conference.

== Identity ==
Mary Hood has said of Southerners on how they approach identity:

Suppose a man is walking across a field. To the question "Who is that?" a Southerner would reply by saying something like "Wasn't his granddaddy the one whose dog and him got struck by lightning on the steel bridge? Mama's third cousin – dead before my time – found his railroad watch in that eight-pound catfish's stomach the next summer just above the dam. I think it was eight pounds. Big as Eunice's arm. The way he married for that new blue Cadillac automobile, reckon how come he's walking like he has on Sunday shoes, if that's who it is, and for sure it is." A Northerner would reply to the same question (only if directly asked, though, never volunteering), "That's Joe Smith." To which the Southerner might think (but be much too polite to say aloud), "They didn't ask his name, they asked who he is!"

— Mary Hood, The New Georgia Guide, 1996,

== Comparison and praise ==
Mary Hood's work has been compared to that of Erskine Caldwell, Carson McCullers and Eudora Welty.

The Prince of Tides author Pat Conroy proclaims: "Mary Hood is not a good writer, she is a great writer."

== Disambiguation ==
Mary Hood the fiction writer should not be confused with Dr. Mary Hood, author of the Joyful Home Schooler and other books. These are two separate individuals.

== Hollywood ==
Mary Hood's work has been tapped by Hollywood – with interest in How Far She Went by Paul Newman, Joanne Woodward and Sydney Pollack. Additionally, Peter Fonda and Jane Fonda have expressed interest in her fiction. A screenplay adaptation has been written for her novel Familiar Heat.

== Current projects ==
Mary Hood is working on a novel titled The Other Side of the River.

== Bibliography ==
=== Novels ===
- Familiar Heat (Knopf, 1995)
- The Other Side of the River (in progress)

=== Novellas ===
- And Venus is Blue (Ticknor & Fields, 1986) – title story from the short story collection is the novella
- Seam Busters: A Novella (Story River Books, 2015)

=== Short story collections ===
- How Far She Went (University of Georgia Press, 1984)
- How Far She Went – briefly noted in The New Yorker 60/49 (January 21, 1985) : 93
- And Venus is Blue (Ticknor & Fields, 1986)
- A Clear View of the Southern Sky: Stories – foreword by Pat Conroy (Story River Books, 2015)

=== Forewords, contributing chapters, published essays ===
- Rosiebelle Lee Wildcat Tennessee by Raymond Andrews – Foreword by Mary Hood (University of Georgia Press, Reprint, 1988)
- Why Stop? – Essay by Mary Hood (The Gettysburg Review, Winter 1988) (The Best American Essays, 1989)
- The Sacrilege of Alan Kent by Erskine Caldwell – Foreword by Mary Hood, Wood Engravings by Ralph Frizzell (University of Georgia Press, 1995)
- "Tropic of Conscience," an historical essay on Northwest Georgia for The New Georgia Guide (University of Georgia Press 1996)

=== Interviews ===
- Wired for Books: Audio Interview with Mary Hood by Don Swaim (1987)
- North Georgia Oral History Series: Interview with Mary Hood by Dede Yow, Thomas A. Scott and Sallie Ellison Loy (Kennesaw State University Oral History Project 1999)

Many of Hood's work has been translated into Dutch, French, Japanese and Swedish.
