= The Myth of the Latin Woman =

- Author: Judith Ortiz Cofer

The Myth of the Latin Woman (also known under the title Just Met a Girl Named Maria) is a non-fiction essay written by Puerto Rican author Judith Ortiz Cofer.

== Background ==
In the essay "The myth of the Latin Woman: I Just met a girl named Maria", author Judith Ortiz Cofer expresses her view of the stereotypes that she and other women of Latin and Hispanic descent have had to endure. She begins the story by relating an experience where a drunk pub patron started singing "Maria", from Westside Story to her, while she was on a bus trip to London from Oxford. As a Latin American woman, Cofer shares her opinion regarding the stereotypes that have occurred throughout her life. Cofer reflects on her childhood and recognizes differences in the way people interact with her and other non-Latino females. She relates her cultural experience to like being on an island (231).

When Cofer is confronted with a career day at school and is faced with the challenge of deciding what is appropriate to wear. She states her expression of clothing could promote the cultural chasm that she faces. Stating "that it became quickly obvious that to the Puerto Rican girls 'dressing up' meant wearing their mother's ornate jewelry and clothing" (231-232).

Cofer expresses how she agonized over her choice of clothing for career day. She states she decides to wear a composite of her cultural experiences, and her view of what a career woman would wear; as she had few role models other than Latina females. She confides how years later she was informed by a friend (an Italian American) at the business school she was attending the Latino girls stood out for wearing "everything at once" (232). With this example, Cofer shows that there is a cultural clash due to that the dress of Latino females differ drastically from the mainstream culture.

Cofer further demonstrates the cultural stereotype of the Latino and Hispanic woman as sexually expressive. "For example, that of the Hispanic woman as the 'hot tamale' or 'sexual firebrand" (232). She tells us that the heritage of Latino women lends them to this expression without fault. She argues that the mothers who grew up on islands were freer to express themselves proactively with a safety net of a culture that showed respect and constraint towards this expression. Cofer states how the view of the "sizzling" Latino woman has caused many Latino woman to be sexually harassed. Cofer gives a startling, yet effective example of when she crosses paths with such bias while staying in a "classy metropolitan Hotel(233).

She encounters a middle-aged, educated gentleman in a tuxedo who when he sees her exclaims Evita! (233), and going on to sing a well-known refrain from the story, engendering a Latino stereotype. This man continues his intrusion by reciting a crude version of the song "La Bamba" revised to reinforce this promiscuous stereotype.

Cofer continues to reveal the "myth of the Latino woman" as being the menial housemaid or domestic by going on to share, how when at a speaking engagement she was confused by one of the attendees as one of the service staff. She was the featured speaker and the woman who had called upon her for a cup of coffee would soon find herself plagued by her stereotypical presumptions. Cofer recognizes this person did not intentionally "profile" her, however, she admitted this would be an obstacle that she would have to continue to overcome.

The author concludes she has been one of the "lucky ones", privileged to get an education and entries into society" (234). While others have a constant struggle against the misconceptions that are perpetuated regarding the Latina women. She recognizes that her upbringing has allowed her a set of goals that include changing these stereotypes to a more universal understanding. Her final point strikes clear when she points the reader in the direction of God and raises the question of whether He is able to relate to the Latina woman as an Anglo-God with a Jewish descent.

== Critical reception ==
In his book José, Can You See?, Alberto Sandoval-Sánchez mentions Cofer's trouble with the stereotyping, but also highlights that she uses the term "Latino" as an identity marker, which shows that she "not only embraces other Latino ethnicities in the U.S., she also engages in the deconstruction of Latina stereotypes in Hollywood and in the media". Other writers commented on the story's theme that no matter where people of Puerto Rican heritage traveled, they were always made aware of that fact because the "island traveled with you". Pauline Newton commented that Cofer's comparisons to various Marias was a "crucial step in the process of the creation of Ortiz Cofer's own transcultural identity".
