= The Line of the Sun =

1989 novel by Judith Ortiz Cofer

- Author: Judith Ortiz Cofer
- Language: English
- Publisher: University of Georgia Press
- Publication date: 1989
- Publication place: Athens, Georgia
- Media type: Print (hardcover)
- Pages: 291 p.
- ISBN: 9780820311067
- OCLC: 18224025
- Dewey Decimal: 813.54
- LC Class: PS3565.R7737 L56 1989

The Line of the Sun, titled La Línea del Sol in the Spanish translation, is a 1989 novel written by Puerto Rican-American author Judith Ortiz Cofer. The story spans three decades, beginning in the late 1930s and ending in the 1960s. The novel is Ortiz Cofer's main work of prose, and its publication helped broaden her readership.

Originally published in English, the novel tells the story of a Puerto Rican family that emigrates to the United States. The story depicts the cultural, social, and personal struggles of family members to maintain their native Puerto Rican culture, and their way of life, both in the Puerto Rican barrio and in the suburbs of New Jersey. The beginning recounts the family's history in Puerto Rico, and the troubled life of Uncle Guzmán. The second half of the novel focuses on Marisol, the eldest daughter of the family. Marisol narrates her family's migration as they transition from rural life and the conditions of the Island to a tenement building in New Jersey, ultimately settling in the suburbs. Her commentary also covers her mother's brief return to the Island.

== Synopsis ==
=== Plot and setting ===
The novel is divided into two parts, tracing the family's story in Puerto Rico, and then New Jersey.

The first half of the novel, in Puerto Rico, is characterized by descriptions of tropical flora and fauna and the vibrant river valley surrounding the home of Rosa, the adolescent Guzmán's young love interest. The novel's setting is conveyed through the primary sensory organs of the body, the ears, eyes, and nose, as Guzmán continues to explore the world around him and begins to yearn for greater adventure beyond Puerto Rico. Rosa's house, the town of Salud, and Guzmán's childhood home represent all that is wonderful about the lush Puerto Rican landscape.

In the second half of the novel, the family has moved to Paterson, New Jersey. The family members each begin to realize that the "promised land" of the United States does not fulfill its promise of wealth, prosperity, and opportunity for all. Guzmán's young niece, Marisol, assumes the role of narrator, conveying her family's struggle to assimilate into American culture through a series of experiences of inequality, discrimination, and misunderstanding. Marisol observes that El Building, their tenement in inner-city Paterson, although dilapidated and cramped, acts as a "microcosm of Island life with its intrigues, its gossip groups, and even its own spiritist" for the members of its community. Marisol describes the new role she takes on as a translator for her mother in a foreign world. Puerto Rico, by then, is real to her only through the visits of her legendary Uncle Guzmán, a physical and emotional embodiment of the rich culture, pride, and beauty her family has left behind for this new life in the U.S.

Judith Ortiz Cofer highlights the economic poverty that has existed in Puerto Rico for decades, even though the country is aesthetically, historically, and culturally rich. Marisol's parents are models for the many parents in the Latinx community who seek fortune and opportunity outside of the island and in the United States. Guzmán, although he loves the island and its beauty, joins the U.S. army in search of adventure in distant places, something he feels the island cannot offer him. Marisol, through these experiences, ultimately discovers that living in the north of the United States, El Norte, only fulfills part of its promise of opportunity and fortune for people outside their homeland. Towards the end of the novel, her parents move to the New Jersey suburbs, an improvement over the Puerto Rican barrio and over the tenement she had grown accustomed to. But Marisol's mother, Ramona, remains separate from those around her, and over the rest of the novel grows increasingly dependent on her young daughter to navigate this unfamiliar political, social, and cultural world. Towards the end, Ramona decides to return briefly to the Island.

Through the medium of stories, cooking, and religious rituals, the author shows how all the characters, in particular Guzmán, Ramona, Rafael, and the others of their generation, keep their culture and heritage alive even as El Norte, the North, continues to alienate them. Towards the end of The Line of the Sun, when Marisol has fully taken ownership of the story, the reader discovers how she and her family fuse their experiences in the North with their native culture, roots, and practices to create a unique Puerto Rican-American narrative.

=== Main characters ===
- Marisol: Teenage daughter of Ramona and Rafael; skeptical, helpful; narrator of the second half of the novel.
- Guzmán: Uncle of Marisol and Gabriel; known at birth as "el niño del diablo"; adventurous, longs for a life off the Island.
- Rosa: Daughter of Doña Lupe; a strong spiritist and herbalist who becomes Guzmán's love interest.
- Ramona: Sister of Guzmán and mother of Marisol; protective, responsible, and intrigued by moving from Puerto Rico.
- Rafael: Son of Don Juan; fair-skinned and blonde; known as a "sad angel"; former Navy veteran, and close friend of Guzmán.
- Mamá Cielo: Mother of Guzmán; a hard worker and very practical; tangible representation of the ethereal sky.
- Papá Pepe: Husband of Mama Cielo and father of Guzmán; a bookworm and strong spiritist.
- Carmelo: Son of Mamá Cielo and Papá Pepe, brother to Guzmán; bookish, melancholy, solitary; dies in battle very young.
- Padre César: "El Padrecito"; thin, sallow, bookish priest in Salud; close friend of Carmelo.
- Gabriel: Younger brother of Marisol and son of Rafael and Ramona; observant, scientific; very close to Marisol.

== Themes ==
=== Identity ===
Judith Ortiz Cofer explores how identity is formed through her characters' movement, not only physically in space and time as individuals, but also as migrants to the United States as a collective cultural unit. She deliberately crosses the boundaries of narrative voice to produce a transgressive novel, challenging the sexual, narrative, and autobiographical norms that affect her as a Puerto Rican-American artist. The character of Marisol embodies a "double otherness", in being separated from her Puerto Rican homeland, physically and culturally, and being fully integrated neither in New Jersey nor in Puerto Rico. Marisol represents a migrant consciousness, typifying Puerto Rican and other migrants who are in a constant state of identity formation and development as they move from place to place.

=== Culture ===
The religious, political, and social atmosphere of the characters' hometown of Salud is depicted in the novel, which also portrays Puerto Rican culture, and cultural transference in a new landscape such as the United States. One illustration of this transference is Marisol's description of her experience of the first few months in El Building:

I put my coat on and left the apartment. The smells and beans boiling in a dozen kitchens assailed my nostrils. Rice and beans, the unimaginative staple food of all these people who re-created every day the same routines they had followed in their mamá's houses so long ago.

In this excerpt, and many others throughout the book, Ortiz Cofer evokes the present condition of the family as they learn to adapt to their new environment. She references the cultural routines transferred from Puerto Rico to El Building that shape this new barrio into a replica of what the characters once knew.

=== Religion and colonialism ===
The author spends time at the beginning of the novel showing the family's traditions, beginning with Mamá Cielo and Papá Pepe as they raise Guzmán. Guzmán is reckless and troublesome from an early age, and his father and mother often pray and keep in contact with "various benevolent entities" to help them raise their child. The narrative conveys deep knowledge of the rich history of the town of Salud, a story rooted in the development of the Church when the Spaniards came to colonize the island. But the history of Salud goes further back than colonization, with anecdotes and hearsay from the villagers' old stories of the past. Ortiz Cofer uses such storytelling techniques to demonstrate the relativity of historical events, and to offer a historical narrative that begins with a non-Eurocentric perspective.

=== Storytelling and truth ===
Judith Ortiz Cofer notes that switching between the perspectives of Marisol and Guzmán is part of the autobiographical style of her prose. Talking to Rafael Ocasio, Professor of Spanish at Agnes Scott College, she describes her approach to storytelling as a movement between personal and public narrative, recognizing the deeply individual experiences of her characters, and also giving voice to the collective experiences they share with others in the communities that they shift between:

As a writer, I feel absolutely at liberty to cross over boundaries. My technique is to start with something that I know very well, like my Uncle Guzmán. People loved him in spite of the fact that he was a rascal. I started with that which was absolutely true. Then I started imagining him in situations that had never actually happened. I think literature has a truth that has nothing to do with the dictionary definition of truth.

Factual and historical elements based on Ortiz Cofer's own life and experiences growing up are combined in the novel with imaginative storytelling that enables characters to speak their truth as they operate in the story line. For Marisol, her ability to conclude the story represents her maturing into a fully grown adult. References to the town of Salud's history, as it is written and passed down through the characters and in the narrative, echo the major historical role of storytelling in Puerto Rican tradition.

=== Natural law and ritual ===
The novel contains references to the spiritual aspects of Salud and its townspeople. The author, however, distinguishes her allusions to espiritismo in The Line of the Sun from the concepts used in magic realism, a literary style prevalent in the works of prominent Latin American authors such as Gabriel García Márquez and Isabel Allende:

As I use espiritismo in my novel, there is nothing there that cannot be explained through natural law. The migrant Puerto Rican brought espiritismo to the United States in order to feel some connection with and some control over a world that was extremely confusing. That's the way I use it in The Line of the Sun.

From Marisol's perspective, similar to that of the author, ritual is mainly rooted in the natural. Ritual transferred from Puerto Rico to the United States transforms into a "socio-psychological defense mechanism" that migrants use to adapt to their new environment, but that other tenants and law enforcement officials in the barrio consider strange and inappropriate in an American context.

== Reception ==
During the Post-Boom phase of the Latin American literary boom, in the 1990s, there was growing interest in Latin American countries. In 1996, the University of Puerto Rico published The Line of the Sun in Spanish translation, as La Línea del Sol, in response to rising public interest in Puerto Rican identity and Judith Ortiz Cofer's work.

Many commentators have criticized Judith Ortiz Cofer's literary style, and her treatment of Puerto Rican-American identity development, in the dual narration of The Line of the Sun. Professor and poet Darlene Pagán notes that this type of criticism is common for any female "Puerto Rican writing in English", because she "is generally expected to conform to certain habits, forms, or significations that identify her as Puerto Rican, one of which is this sense of place". Other critics have described her work as "straddling two cultures", because the fluidity of space and the location shifts throughout this novel and some of her other work make it difficult to categorize and interpret as either Puerto Rican or American literature. Socolovsky identifies this as being a "common trope for understanding U.S. multicultural writers".
