= Rowan Oak =

Historic house in Mississippi, United States

- U.S. National Register of Historic Places
- U.S. National Historic Landmark
- Mississippi Landmark
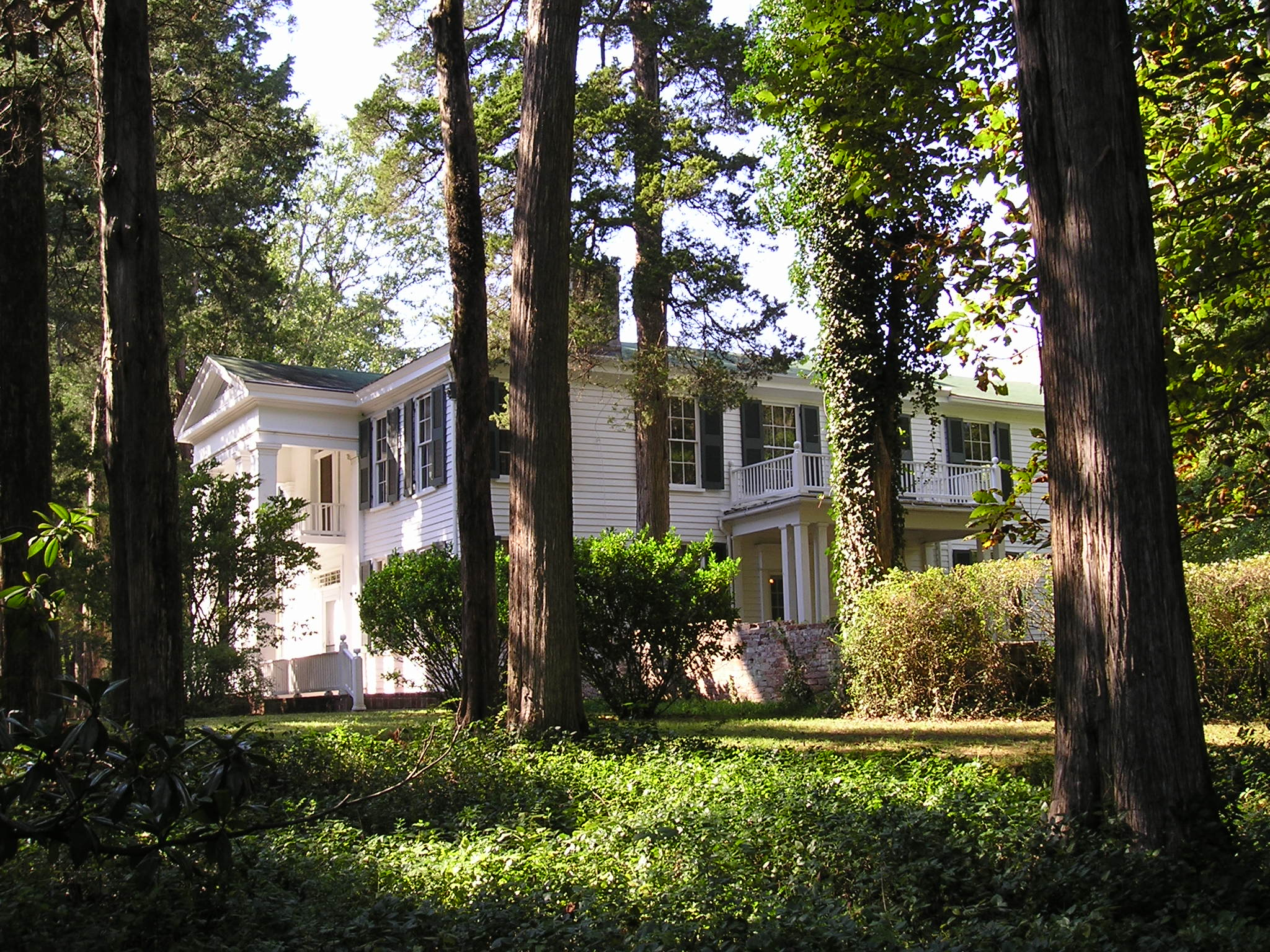
- Rowan Oak

- Location within Mississippi Location within the United States
- Interactive map showing the location of Rowan Oak
- Location: Old Taylor Road, Oxford, Mississippi
- Coordinates: 34.3598°N 89.5247°W
- Built: 1844
- Architect: Col. Robert Sheegog
- Architectural style: Greek Revival
- NRHP reference No.: 68000028
- USMS No.: 071-OXF-0502-NHL-ML

Significant dates
- Added to NRHP: May 23, 1968
- Designated NHL: May 23, 1968
- Designated USMS: January 15, 1986

Rowan Oak was the home of author William Faulkner in Oxford, Mississippi. It is a primitive Greek Revival house originally built in 1844 for Robert B Sheegog, an Irish immigrant farmer from Tennessee. Faulkner purchased the house when it was in disrepair in 1930, and resided there until his death in 1962. The home has been owned and operated by the University of Mississippi since 1972, and is open to the public year-round.

== History ==
The house was originally built in 1844 and sits on four landscaped acres, surrounded by 29 acres of woods known as Bailey Woods. The original owners, The Sheegogs, lived in the home from 1844 to 1872. The home originally was designed with an L-shaped layout with a 450 square foot center hall connecting a parlor and dining room on one side with a library on the other. A quarter-turn stair led to the second floor and its three bedrooms. Several features from the antebellum era remain on the property including the alley of Eastern Red Cedar trees that line the driveway and front entrance. During that time, it was believed that cedar trees purified the air of the yellow fever virus. There also remains a concentric circle garden, post oak barn, and slave dwelling on the property.

In 1872, the Bailey family purchased the home and resided there until 1923. Around the turn of the century, Julia Bailey added an indoor kitchen and pantry, a front porch, and a bathroom; she also enclosed a dogtrot hallway in the servants' area.

The property had been unoccupied for seven years before William Faulkner purchased it in 1930. In 1931, he renamed it "Rowan Oak" after two trees: the rowan tree of Scotland for peace and security, and the live oak for strength and solitude. Neither of those trees can be found on the property, and there is no such tree species known as a "rowan oak". Soon thereafter, he settled with his wife, Estelle, and her two children from a previous marriage, Malcolm and Victoria. Within a few years their daughter Jill was born. Rowan Oak served as the Faulkner family home until William Faulkner's death in 1962.

Rowan Oak was William Faulkner's private world, in reality and imagination, and he was fascinated with its history. During his time at Rowan Oak, Faulkner kept horses on the property for riding, jumping, and, occasionally, fox hunting, and he would often attend athletics events at nearby Ole Miss.

Faulkner made several renovations and additions to the home and property. In the 1930s, he installed plumbing and electricity, added brick terraces with balustrades framing the front portico, added a porch off the dining room, a porte-cochère on the home's west side, a fourth bedroom, a butler's pantry and kitchen, as well as other structural changes. In the 1950s, he oversaw other updates, including the enclosing of the second floor sleeper porch and the ground floor porch. In 1951, Faulkner added a private closet, bathroom, and office on the ground floor. He would spend the last decade of his career writing in the office, and wrote the outline of his Pulitzer Prize-winning novel A Fable on the office walls.

Faulkner's years spent at Rowan Oak were productive, resulting in him ultimately winning the Nobel Prize for Literature in 1949, and the Pulitzer Prize and National Book Award for A Fable in 1954.

== Preservation ==
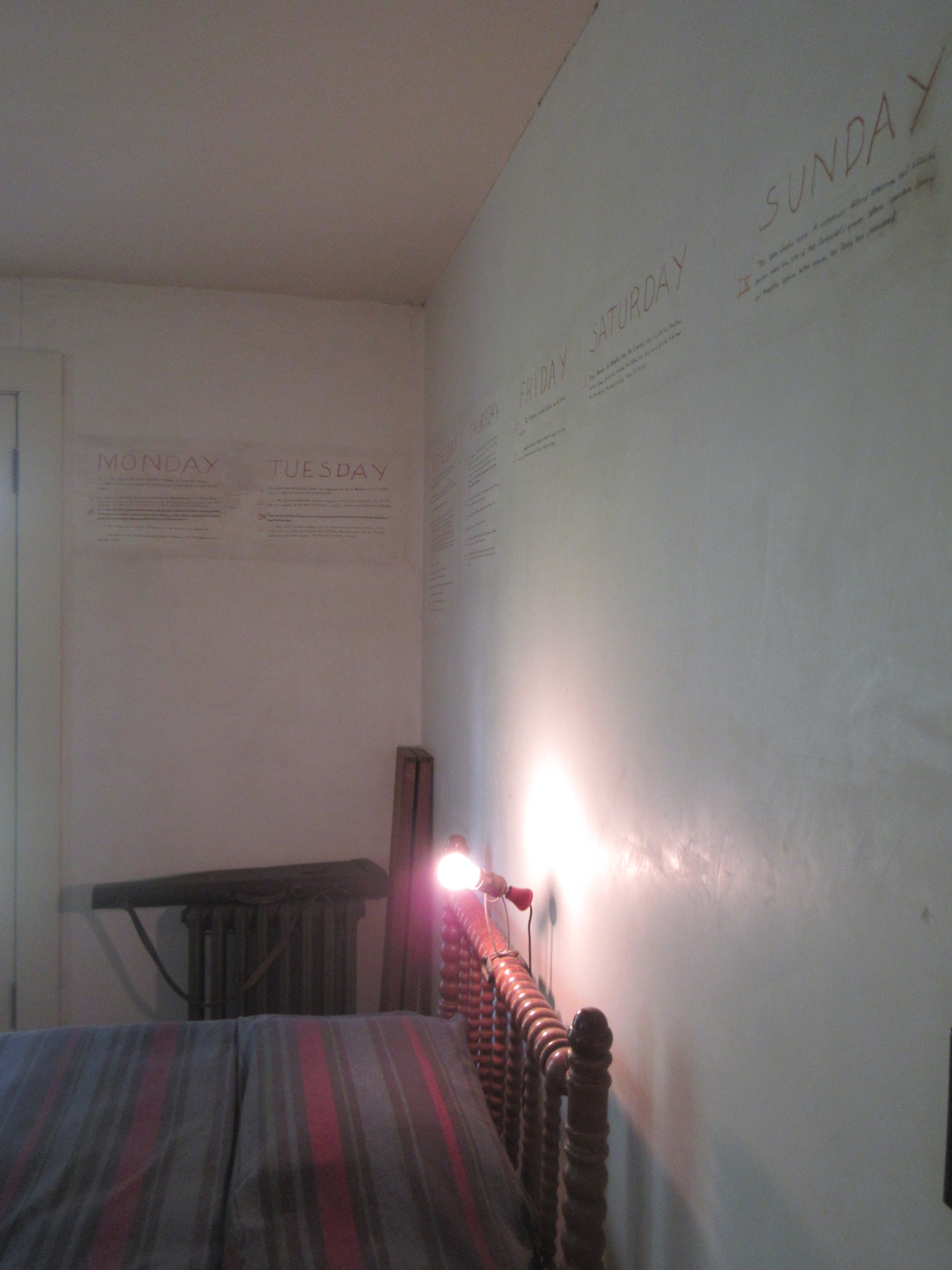
Faulkner wrote the plot outline of his 1954 novel A Fable on the walls of his office at Rowan Oak.

In 1972, the University of Mississippi purchased Rowan Oak. The home is preserved as it was at the time of Faulkner's death in 1962 and contains 90% of all the original furnishings. The university maintains the home in order to promote Faulkner's literary legacy, and it is open to visitors year-round. The home has been visited by such writers as John Updike, Czesław Miłosz, Charles Simic, Richard Ford, James Lee Burke, Bei Dao, Charles Wright, Charles Frazier, Alice Walker, the Coen brothers, Bobbie Ann Mason, Salman Rushdie, and others. Writer Mark Richard once repaired a faulty doorknob on the French door to Faulkner's study.

Rowan Oak was declared a National Historic Landmark in 1977.

The current curators of Rowan Oak are William Griffith and Rachel Hudson. Past curators include the novelists Howard Bahr and Cynthia Shearer. The original curator was Bev Smith, an Ole Miss alumna, who was responsible for finding a large number of Faulkner's original manuscripts hidden within the closet under the stairs in the home.

== See also ==
- List of residences of American writers
