= James Kilgo =

American writer (1941–2002)

James Patrick Kilgo (June 27, 1941 – December 8, 2002) was an American essayist and novelist, known for writing about nature. He was a professor at the University of Georgia.

== Early life and education ==
Kilgo was born June 27, 1941, in Darlington, South Carolina to John Simpson Kilgo and Caroline Lawton. He received a Bachelor of Arts from Wofford College in 1963, then a Master of Arts and Doctor of Philosophy in American Literature from Tulane University in 1965 and 1972 respectively.

== Career ==
In 1967, Kilgo began teaching at the University of Georgia, where he remained until his retirement in 1999. He released his debut book, an essay collection titled Deep Enough for Ivorybills, with Algonquin Books in 1988, followed by six other non-fiction and fiction texts, including Inheritance of Horses (1994), The Blue Wall (1996), Daughter of My People (1998), The Hand-Carved Creche and other Christmas Memories (1999), The Colors of Africa (2003), and Ossabaw (2004), the last of which were published posthumously. His 1998 novel Daughter of My People won the 2000 Townsend Prize for Fiction. Kilgo was inducted into the Georgia Writers Hall of Fame in 2011.

== Personal life ==
Kilgo married Jane Guillory on August 27, 1963. The couple had three children.

Kilgo died from cancer on December 8, 2002, in Athens, Georgia.

== Publications ==
- Deep Enough for Ivorybills (Algonquin Books of Chapel Hill, 1988)
- Inheritance of Horses (University of Georgia Press, 1994)
- The Blue Wall: Wilderness of the Carolinas and Georgia (Westcliffe, 1996)
- Daughter of My People (University of Georgia Press, 1998)
- The Hand-Carved Creche and other Christmas Memories (Hill Street Press, 1999)
- The Colors of Africa (University of Georgia Press, 2003)
- Ossabaw: Evocations of an Island (with Jack Leigh, Alan Campbell) (University of Georgia Press, 2004)
