= Cynthia Shearer =

American academic and novelist

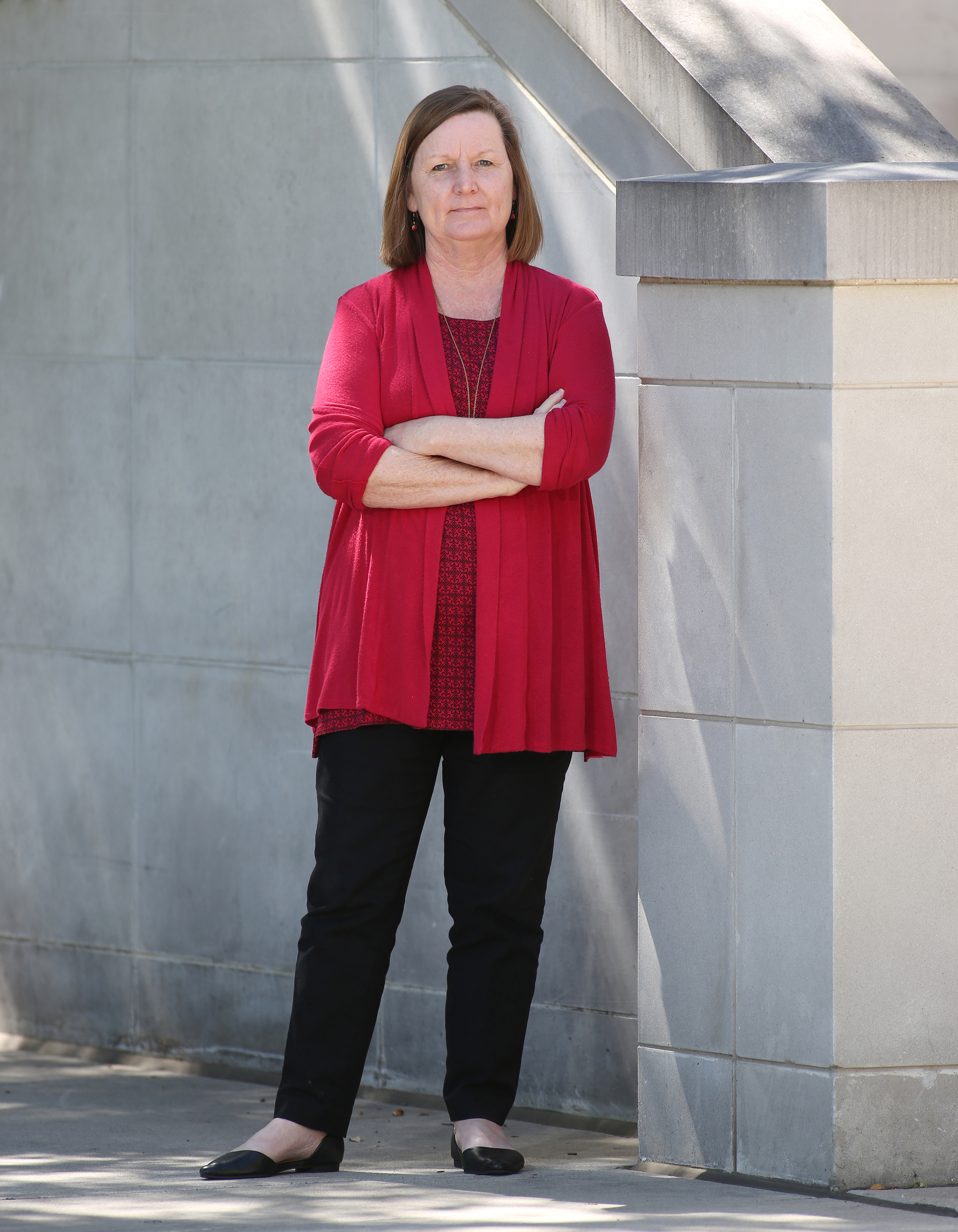
- Cynthia Shearer photographed by Carolyn Cruz
- Born: June 25, 1955 (age 71); Chicopee, Massachusetts
- Occupations: Author & adjunct professor of English at Texas Christian University & former curator of William Faulkner's Oxford home, Rowan Oak
- Years active: 1994–present
- Notable work: Two Fictional Novels,The Wonder Book of the Air and The Celestial Jukebox
- Spouse: Daniel Williams

Cynthia Shearer is an American novelist known for The Wonder Book of the Air and The Celestial Jukebox, southern literatures inspired from personal experiences growing up in Georgia and Mississippi. Shearer is a former curator for William Faulkner's Oxford home, Rowan Oak, and in 2024 retired as a writing consultant at Texas Christian University.

== Early life and education ==
Shearer was born on June 25, 1955, in Westover Air Force Base in Chicopee, Massachusetts. Less than a month after her birth, her family moved to Alapaha, Georgia, her parents' hometown. She describes Alapaha as a "small town where everyone knew everyone else's family tree, and life was simple." Not long after their arrival to Alapaha her parents divorced. Shearer remained with her mother, Marjorie E. Shearer, an English teacher through her high school years. In a 1997 interview, Shearer said that she "read more than anyone around [her], and . . . kept a journal every day."

In the 1970s, Shearer enrolled at Valdosta State College (now known as Valdosta State University). After earning her bachelor's degree in 1977, Cynthia Shearer moved to Oxford, Mississippi to pursue a master's degree in English from the University of Mississippi and graduated in 1979. In the 1980s Shearer completed coursework for a Ph.D. in English but did not finish the degree. After taking a fiction writing course with Barry Hannah, she opted to write fiction.

== Published works and recognition ==
Shearer is known for authoring two works of fiction: The Wonder Book of the Air and The Celestial Jukebox Her first piece, The Wonder Book of the Air, won the 1996 prize for fiction from the Mississippi Institute of Arts and Letters. Her work has appeared in several publications such as Virginia Quarterly Review, Tri-Quarterly, the Missouri Review, and the Oxford American. Shearer was awarded a National Endowment for the Arts Fellowship in Fiction in 2000. Shearer's autobiographical short fiction “Flight Patterns” was included in anthologies The Best of the Oxford American (2002) and After O'Connor: Stories from Contemporary Georgia (2003).Her Oxford American essay “Barbershop Duet: Looking for Janis Joplin in Port Arthur” was included The Oxford American Book of Great Music Writing (2008). Her 2005 novel The Celestial Jukebox has been the subject of numerous critical articles and is often included in surveys of Southern literature for its representation of the historic and social differences found in various immigrant communities living in the Mississippi Delta at the end of the twentieth century.

Shearer is known for curating Rowan Oak, William Faulkner's home in Oxford, Mississippi, for six years. Her 2006 essay about that work won a Pushcart Prize. Shearer was inducted in 2018 to the Georgia Writers Hall of Fame. The University of Georgia Libraries established the Georgia Writers Hall of Fame in 2000 to honor Georgia writers and expand Georgia literature and cultural history research. She lives in Fort Worth, Texas, with her husband, Dan Williams.
