= Cathryn Hankla =

American poet

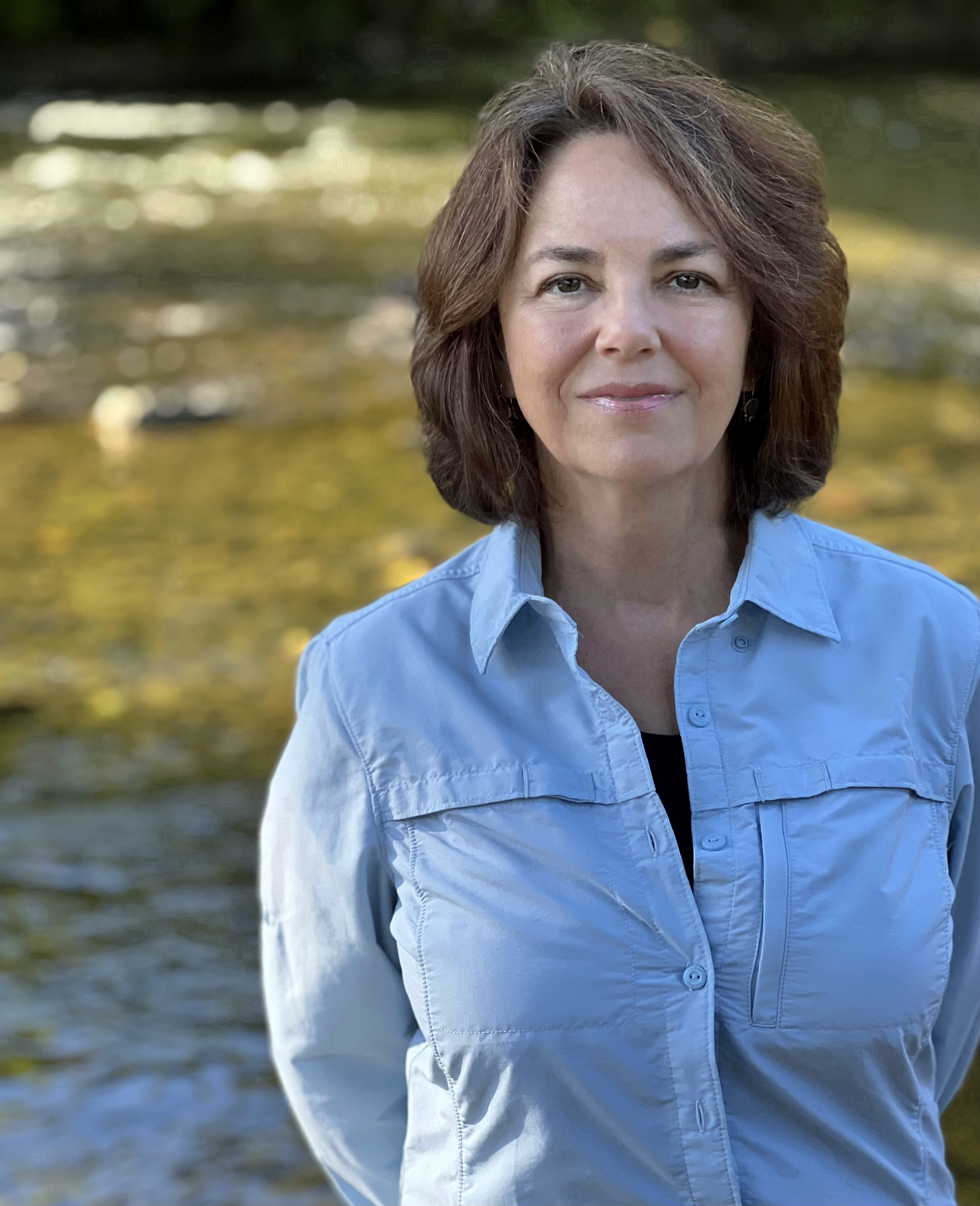
- Hankla in 2022
- Born: March 20, 1958 (age 68); Richlands, Virginia, U.S.
- Education: Hollins College (BA, MA)
- Occupations: Poet; novelist; essayist
- Website: www.cathrynhankla.com

Cathryn "Cathy" Hankla (born March 20, 1958) is an American poet, novelist, essayist and author of short stories. She is professor emerita of English and Creative Writing at Hollins University in Hollins, Virginia, and served as inaugural director of Hollins' Jackson Center for Creative Writing from 2008 to 2012.

Hankla is the author of more than a dozen books of poetry and prose. Her writing has been published in multiple journals and anthologies, including the Chicago Tribune, Ploughshares, Virginia Quarterly Review, The Missouri Review, Alaska Quarterly Review, Shenandoah, Denver Quarterly, Prairie Schooner, Passages North, A Cast Iron Aeroplane That Can Actually Fly: Contemporary Poets Comment on Their Prose Poems, and A Literary Field Guide to Southern Appalachia.

While at Hollins, Hankla was appointed Susan Gager Jackson Professor of Creative Writing (2012–2014). She twice chaired the university's English and Creative Writing department and taught courses in image/word, drawing, writing, cartooning, and filmmaking, in addition to literature and creative writing. Additionally, Hankla has held teaching appointments at Washington and Lee University (1989–1991), Randolph Macon Women's College (1987) and the University of Virginia (1985). She has served as Poetry Editor for The Hollins Critic , a literary journal, since 1996.

== Life ==
Hankla was born in the Appalachian town of Richlands, Virginia. She currently resides in Roanoke, Virginia and operates a painting studio. She collaborates with artists of various disciplines as part of her generative process. Much of her work is featured on cathrynhankla.com.

== Publications ==
Hankla's 14 books of poetry and prose include Lost Places: On Losing and Finding Home, Galaxies, Great Bear, Fortune Teller, Miracle Fish, Last Exposures: A Sequence of Poems, and Texas School Book Depository: Prose Poems.(See full list below).

== Bibliography ==
=== Essays ===
- Lost Places: On Losing and Finding Home Mercer University Press. 2018. ISBN 9780881466485

=== Novels ===
- The Land Between Baskerville Publishers. 2003. ISBN 9781880909645
- A Blue Moon in Poorwater Ticknor and Fields. 1988. Reprinted University Press of Virginia. 1998. ISBN 9780813918464

=== Poetry ===
- Return to a Certain Region of Consciousness: New and Selected Poems Mercer University Press. 2025. ISBN 9780881460414
- Immortal Stuff: Prose Poems Mercer University Press. 2023. ISBN 9780881468748
- Not Xanadu Mercer University Press. 2022. ISBN 9780881468328
- Galaxies Mercer University Press. 2017. ISBN 9780881466164
- Great Bear Groundhog Poetry Press, LLC. 2016. ISBN 9780997676600
- Last Exposures: A Sequence of Poems Louisiana State University Press. 2004. ISBN 9780807129487
- Poems for the Pardoned Louisiana State University Press. 2002. ISBN 9780807128138
- Emerald City Blues Tryon Publishing Co. 2002. ISBN 9781884824289
- Texas School Book Depository: Prose Poems Louisiana State University Press. 2000. ISBN 9780807125410
- Negative History Louisiana State University Press. 1997. ISBN 9780807121535
- Afterimages Louisiana State University Press. 1991. ISBN 9780807116852
- Phenomena University of Missouri Press. 1983. ISBN 9780826203861

=== Short story collections ===
- Fortune Teller Miracle Fish Michigan State University Press. 2011. ISBN 9781611860047
- Learning the Mother Tongue University of Missouri Press. 1987. ISBN 9780826206220

=== Chapbooks and monographs ===
- Imaginative Thinking: Expressive Writing and Drawing. Nancy Dahlstrom and Cathryn Hankla. Hollins University Press. 2003.
- Cool Water: An Interview and New Poems. Yarrow Chapbook Series. 1992.

=== Journal features ===
- Hankla's poem "What Falls" featured in A Cast Iron Airplane That Can Actually Fly: Contemporary Poets Comment on Their Prose Poems MadHat Press. 2019. ISBN 9781941196922
- Hankla's poem "Two-Chambered Heart" featured in A Literary Field Guide to Southern Appalachia University of Georgia Press. 2019. ISBN 9780820356242

== Awards and recognition ==
=== Writing ===
Among various other recognitions, Hankla has received a Virginia Commission for the Arts Fellowship in Poetry (1998), a PEN Syndicated Fiction Prize (for "Lost in Space," 1989), and the James Boatwright III Prize ( 2009) for her poem "Bee Tree." Her first book of poetry, Phenomena, reviewed by NPR as one of the five best collections of the year (1983), and her story collection Learning the Mother Tongue were both Breakthrough Series winners (1983, 1987).

Two volumes of Hankla's poetry have been finalists in the Library of Virginia Awards (Texas School Book Depository: Prose Poems (2001), and Great Bear (2017)). Her short story "Powerful Angels," originally published in Virginia Quarterly Review, was listed in Best American Short Stories' "100 Other Distinguished Short Stories" (2001).

Hankla's early papers are archived at James Branch Cabell Library in Richmond, Virginia.

=== Visual art ===
Hankla’s geometric abstract paintings were included in Studio Visit (2009) and have been selected for national juried shows. Her paintings hang in private and corporate collections in Arizona, Colorado, Massachusetts, Michigan, North Carolina, Texas, and Virginia.

== Education ==
Hankla attended Pulaski County High School in Dublin, Virginia, where she was involved with drama, band, filmmaking, and photography. She served as editor of the student literary magazine, Inklings.

Hankla later received her Bachelor of Arts in English and Film from Hollins College in Hollins, Virginia (Hollins University, today) in 1980. She earned her Master of Arts in English and Creative Writing from Hollins in 1982.

== Academic appointments ==
- Chairperson, Department of English and Creative Writing, Hollins University (2016–2020).
- Director, MFA and Undergraduate Creative Writing, Jackson Center for Creative Writing, Hollins University (2008–2012).
- Coordinator, Graduate Teaching Fellows, Hollins University (2004–2007).
- Director, Graduate Teaching Fellows, Hollins University (2004–2005).
- Chair, Department of English, Hollins University (1995-1998).
- Chair, Imagination Studies Pathway, Hollins University (1991-1995).
