= Judson Mitcham =

American poet

- Born: 1948 (age 77–78); Monroe, Georgia, U.S.
- Education: University of Georgia (PhD)
- Occupations: Author; poet
- Parent(s): Wilson Mitcham; Myrtle

Judson Mitcham (born 1948) is an American author and poet best known for being the state of Georgia's tenth official poet laureate between 2012 and 2019. He is the only writer to win the Townsend Prize for Fiction twice. His poetry is featured regularly in publications such as Harpers, The Georgia Review, The Chattahoochee Review, The Gettysburg Review, and Southern Poetry Review.

In 2002, Mitcham began teaching writing workshops as a part-time professor at Mercer University. He also directed the Summer Writers' Institute at Emory University.

== Life and career ==
Judson Cofield Mitcham was born in 1948 in Monroe, Georgia to Wilson Mitcham, who worked at the local mill, and Myrtle, who worked for the New Deal Seed Loan Program. When he was 16, Judson Mitcham was involved in a car accident while driving a Chevrolet Corvair, which caused the death of one of his friends. Thinking about this incident was among the things that fueled Mitcham to write.

Mitcham studied psychology at University of Georgia, receiving his Ph.D. at 1974. He taught psychology at Fort Valley State University until his retirement in 2004.

In interviews, Mitcham has stated he had not written poetry in a serious way until he was 30. He originally wanted to write songs, but realized that his lyrical skills were a lot better than his music skills. His first published poetry collection, Somewhere in Ecclesiastes, won him both the Devins Award and the Georgia Author of the Year. His first novel, The Sweet Everlasting, won the Townsend Prize for Fiction. Mitcham stated that he wrote "narrative poems", and thus switching from poetry to fiction was a natural one. His poems and novels are set in Georgia, and the themes of his works include family, loss, age, and spirituality.

In 2012, Georgia's Governor Nathan Deal named him the state's Poet Laureate. As Poet Laureate, he initiated Poet Laureate's Prize, awarded annually to an original poem written by a Georgia high school student. In 2013, Mitcham was inducted into Georgia Writers Hall of Fame. He resides in Macon with his wife. He has two children and four grandchildren.

== Bibliography ==
=== Poetry ===
Collections

- Somewhere in Ecclesiastes (1991)
- The Sweet Everlasting (1996)
- This April Day (2003)
- Sabbath Creek (2004)
- Heart of All Greatness (2007)
- A Little Salvation: Poems Old and New (2007)

List of poems

Title	Year	First published	Reprinted/collected
Preface to an omnibus interview	1994	Mitcham, Judson (Summer 1994). "Preface to an omnibus interview". The Georgia Review.	Mitcham, Judson (November 1994). "Preface to an omnibus interview". Harper's Magazine. 289 (1734): 32.
