= Ferrol Sams =

American writer

- Born: Ferrol Aubrey Sams Jr. September 26, 1922; Fayette County, Georgia, U.S.
- Died: January 29, 2013 (aged 90); Fayetteville, Georgia, U.S.
- Education: Mercer University; Emory University School of Medicine (MD)
- Occupations: Physician; novelist
- Spouse: Helen Fletcher (m. 1948)
- Children: 4
- Parent(s): Ferrol Aubrey Sams Sr. Mildred Matthews

Ferrol Aubrey Sams Jr. (September 26, 1922 – January 29, 2013) was an American physician and novelist.

== Early life and education ==
Sams was born to Mildred Matthews and Ferrol Aubrey Sams Sr, in Fayette County, Georgia, United States. The younger Sams lived in a house built by his great-grandfather. On July 18, 1948, he married Helen Fletcher, who was also a physician. Sams' medical career started at Mercer University in Macon, Georgia, from which he graduated in 1942. He then attended Emory University School of Medicine for a semester and then joined the United States Army Medical Corps.

After serving from 1943 to 1947 and seeing action in France, Sams returned to Emory to continue his medical studies. He received his M.D. in 1949. Both Sams and his wife, Helen, practiced medicine in Fayette County until they retired in 2006. Sams was affectionately known by his family and a few close friends as "Sambo". Sams had four children—Ferrol Aubrey Sams III, James (Jim) Sams, Ellen Sams Nichol and Fletcher Sams. Ferrol III and Jim are both medical doctors and practice in Fayette County. Ellen is a hospital administrator where her brothers practice, and Fletcher is a Fayette County judge.

While at Mercer, Sams was initiated into Kappa Alpha Order by the Kappa chapter. In 2001, he became the nineteenth recipient of Kappa Alpha Order's highest honor, the Distinguished Achievement Award.

== Literary career ==
Sams wrote eight books, including a trilogy of works featuring Porter Osborne Jr., a character who appears to be largely based on Sams himself. Sams's writing drew heavily on Southern storytelling tradition. Run with the Horsemen was Sams' first book, published in 1982 when he was 60. In 1991, Sams was awarded the Townsend Prize for Fiction for his publication of When All the World Was Young.

Sams's works of fiction developed from the act of writing his own memoirs of growing up in rural Fayette County for his posterity. His works are generally set during the Depression and feature several eccentric characters.

Sams has been the subject of several community reading programs: Run with the Horsemen was chosen as the 2006 Atlanta Reads selection, and Down Town was selected for the 2007 Gwinnett Reads by the Gwinnett County Public Library.

Mercer University Press awards the Ferrol Sams Award for Fiction annually. It is "given to the best manuscript that speaks to the human condition in a Southern context. This category includes both novels and short stories." In addition, the Jennifer Sams Endowed Memorial Scholarship Fund was established in memory of his granddaughter.

== Death ==
Sams died January 29, 2013, at his home in Fayetteville, Georgia at age 90.

== Bibliography ==
- Run with the Horsemen (1982)
- The Whisper of the River (1985)
- The Passing: Perspectives of Rural America (1988), with illustrations by Jim Harrison
- The Widow's Mite (1989)
- Christmas Gift! (1989)
- When All the World Was Young (1992)
- Epiphany (1995)
- The Passing: Stories (2001)
- Down Town (2007)
