= Terry Kay =

American novelist (1938–2020)

- Born: Terry Winter Kay; February 10, 1938; Royston, Georgia, U.S.
- Died: December 12, 2020 (aged 82); Athens, Georgia, U.S.
- Occupation: Novelist
- Spouse: Tommie Duncan Kay
- Children: Four
- Writing career
- Notable awards: Townsend Prize; Georgia Author of the Year; Southern Emmy Award; Appalachian Heritage Writers Award
- Website: terrykay.com

Terry Winter Kay (February 10, 1938 – December 12, 2020) was an American author, whose novels examined life in the American South. His most well-known book, To Dance with the White Dog, was made into a Hallmark Hall of Fame television movie starring Hume Cronyn and Jessica Tandy. Three of Kay's books became movies.

== Early life and career ==
Born in Royston, Georgia to T.H. and Viola Winn Kay, Kay was the eleventh of twelve children. He graduated from LaGrange College in 1959, majoring in social science. After college he sold insurance, then found work as a copy boy and then writer for the Decatur-DeKalb News. He moved to the Atlanta Journal as a sports writer and film and theater critic. In 1973 he left the Journal to work in advertising, and in 1977 he moved to work at Oglethorpe Power. By the time he left in 1989 to devote his full time to writing, he had become Oglethorpe's vice president for public relations.

At the urging of his friend, writer Pat Conroy, he submitted a magazine article manuscript to Houghton-Mifflin that provided the concept for a novel. His experience of growing up on a rural farm without electricity formed the basis of The Year the Lights Came On, published in 1976.

== Writing career ==
Kay's second novel, After Eli, was published in 1981, winning the Georgia Writer's Association award for Author of the Year. It was followed by Dark Thirty in 1984.

The Southeastern Library Association named Kay Outstanding Author of the Year in 1991 for To Dance with the White Dog, based in part on his father's experiences after the death of Kay's mother. The book was a bestseller, selling especially well in Japan, where 2 million copies sold. A 1993 movie starring Hume Cronyn and Jessica Tandy aired on Hallmark Hall of Fame, winning an Emmy Award for Cronyn. It was followed by a 2002 Japanese version and a 2016 Japanese theatrical production. To Dance with the White Dog was twice nominated for the American Booksellers Association Book of the Year award.

Kay won a Southern Emmy Award in 1990 for his teleplay, Run Down the Rabbit. Kay's novel The Valley of Light won the 2004 Townsend Prize for Fiction. Kay received the 2006 Appalachian Heritage Writers Award.

Two more books, The Runaway and The Valley of Light, were adapted as movies.

Kay lived in Athens, Georgia with his wife Tommie Duncan Kay. He had four children. He died on December 12, 2020, of liver cancer.

== Bibliography ==
=== Novels ===
- The Year the Lights Came On (1976)
- After Eli (1981)
- Dark Thirty (1984)
- To Dance with the White Dog (1990)
- Shadow Song (1994)
- The Runaway (1997)
- The Kidnapping of Aaron Greene (1999)
- Taking Lottie Home (2000)
- The Valley of Light (2003)
- The Book of Marie (2007)
- Bogmeadow's Wish (2011)
- The Seventh Mirror (2013)
- Song of the Vagabond Bird (2014)
- The Forever Wish of Middy Sweet (2020)

=== Other books ===
- To Whom the Angel Spoke: A Story of the Christmas (1991)
- Special K: The Wisdom of Terry Kay (2000)
- The Greats of Cuttercane: The Southern Stories (2011)

=== Movie adaptations of Kay's work ===
- To Dance with the White Dog (1993 and 2002)
- The Runaway (2002)
- The Valley of Light (2007)

=== Teleplays ===
- Run Down the Rabbit

=== Plays ===
- Piano Cabaret
