= Stephenson =

Origin
- Language: English
- Meaning: "son of Stephen" (from Greek "stephanos", meaning "crown")

Other names
- Variant forms: Steffensen, Stefansson, Stephensen, Stevenson, Stivenson

Stephenson is a medieval patronymic surname meaning "son of Stephen". The earliest public record is found in the county of Huntingdonshire in 1279. There are variant spellings including Stevenson. People with the surname include:

- Ashley Stephenson (born 1982), Canadian hockey and baseball player
- Ashley Stephenson (1927–2021), British horticulturalist
- Benjamin Stephenson (disambiguation), several people
- Ben Stephenson (fl. 1990s–2020s), Anglo-American television executive
- Chandler Stephenson (born 1994), Canadian ice hockey player
- Charles Bruce Stephenson (1929–2001), American astronomer
- D. C. Stephenson (1891–1966), American, Ku Klux Klan leader
- Debra Stephenson (born 1972), British actress
- Dwight Stephenson (born 1957), American football player
- Earl Stephenson (born 1947), American baseball pitcher
- F. Richard Stephenson (born 1941), British astronomer
- Gene Stephenson, American college baseball coach
- George Stephenson (1781–1848), British mechanical engineer who created Stephenson's Rocket
- George Robert Stephenson (1819–1905), English civil engineer (nephew of George Stephenson)
- George Stephenson (disambiguation), multiple other people
- Gilbert Stephenson (1878–1972), British Vice Admiral
- Gordon Stephenson (1908–1997), Australian town planner and architect
- Helga Stephenson, Canadian media executive
- Henry Stephenson (1871–1956), British actor
- Isaac Stephenson (1829–1918), U.S. politician from Wisconsin
- Jim Stephenson, New Zealand international football (soccer) goalkeeper
- John Stephenson (disambiguation), people named John Stephenson
- June Ethel Stephenson (1914–1999), Australian artist
- Lance Stephenson (born 1990), American professional basketball player
- M. F. Stephenson (1802–1881/2), American assayer of the Dahlonega, Georgia Mint
- Neal Stephenson (born 1959), U.S. author
- Nicola Stephenson (born 1971), British actress
- Pamela Stephenson (born 1949), New Zealand-Australian comedian, actress and psychologist, also known as Pamela Connolly
- Paul Stephenson (footballer) (born 1968), former British footballer
- Paul Stephenson (civil rights campaigner) (born 1937), British civil rights campaigner
- Sir Paul Stephenson (born 1983), former London Metropolitan Police Commissioner
- Paul Stephenson (rugby league), Australian professional rugby league footballer
- Riggs Stephenson (1898–1985), U.S. baseball player
- Robert Stephenson (1803–1859), English civil engineer and designer of locomotives
- Robert Stephenson (disambiguation), several other people
- Rosie Stephenson-Goodknight (born 1953), U.S. Wikipedia editor
- Roy Laverne Stephenson (1917–1982), judge of the United States Court of Appeals for the Eighth Circuit
- Samuel M. Stephenson (1803–1859), U.S. politician from Michigan
- Sean Stephenson (1979–2019), American therapist, writer, and speaker
- Shay Stephenson (born 1983), Canadian ice hockey player
- Thomas Alan Stephenson (1898–1961), British zoologist
- Thomas Frederick Stephenson (1894–1917), British World War I flying ace
- Tyler Stephenson (born 1996), American baseball player
- William Stephenson (1897–1989), Canadian soldier, airman, businessman, inventor, and spymaster
- William Stephenson (psychologist) (1902–1989), psychologist and physicist
- William Haswell Stephenson (1836–1918), English industrialist and philanthropist in Newcastle upon Tyne

== See also ==
- Clan MacTavish - Stephenson Associated Family Name (Septs)
- Justice Stephenson (disambiguation)
- Stephen (surname)
- Stephens Surname
- Stevenson Surname
- Stinson (surname)
