= Stephens =

Stephens is a surname. It is a patronymic and is recorded in England from 1086.

Notable people with the surname include:

- Alexander Stephens (born 1996), Welsh musician better known as Strawberry Guy
- Alexander H. Stephens (1812–1883), Vice President of the Confederate States
- Alison Stephens (1970–2010), British mandolinist
- Ann S. Stephens (1813–1886), American dime novelist
- Anne Stephens (WRAF officer) (1912–2000), director of the Women's Royal Air Force
- Annie Fitzgerald Stephens (1844–1934), American landowner and grandmother of Margaret Mitchell
- Arran Stephens (born 1944), Canadian author and organic food advocate
- Beau Stephens (born 2002), American football player
- Brad Stephens (born 1979), former Australian rules footballer
- Brandon Stephens (disambiguation), multiple people
- Bret Stephens (born 1973), Pulitzer Prize-winning American journalist, editor, and columnist
- Chad Stephens, American politician
- Charles Stephens (disambiguation), multiple people
- Clara Bloodgood, born Clara Stephens (1870–1907) American stage actress, granddaughter of Ann S. Stephens
- Dwayne Stephens (born 1971), American college basketball coach
- Eliza Stephens (1757–1815), English governess, later emigrated to Russia
- Eric John Stephens (1895–1967), Australian flying ace
- Florence Stephens (1881–1979), landholder and the main figure of the Huseby court case
- Frederic George Stephens (1828–1907), British art critic and member of the Pre-Raphaelite Brotherhood
- George Stephens (disambiguation), several people
- H. F. Stephens (1868–1931), British civil engineer in railroads
- Harry J. Stephens (1866–1947), Australian journalist
- Helen Stephens (1918–1994), American athlete
- Henry Stephens (disambiguation), several people
- Hubert D. Stephens (1875–1946), Mississippi politician
- Huw Stephens (born 1981), Welsh radio DJ and television presenter
- Jack Stephens (footballer) (born 1994), English footballer
- Jackson Stephens (baseball) (born 1994), American baseball player
- James Stephens (disambiguation), several people
- James Francis Stephens (1792–1852), English zoologist
- Jane Stephens (1879–1959), Irish zoologist
- Jane Stephens (actress) (1812?–1896), British actress
- Jeffrey Stephens, American politician
- Jeremy Stephens (born 1986), American mixed martial arts fighter
- John Lloyd Stephens (1805–1852), American explorer and diplomat
- John R. Stephens, Canadian Anglican bishop
- John Stephens Jr. (born 1999), American football player
- John Roger Stephens (born 1978), American singer-songwriter and pianist, known as John Legend
- Jonathan Stephens (born 1960), British civil servant
- Kate Stephens, American naturalist
- Kenny Stephens (born 1946), English footballer
- Les Stephens (1898–1958) Australian rules footballer
- Linden Stephens (born 1995), American football player
- Linton Stephens (1823–1872), associate justice of the Supreme Court of Georgia
- Marvin Stephens (1922–2008), American actor
- Maybelle Stephens (1872–1919), American suffragist
- Meic Stephens (1938–2018), Welsh literary editor and journalist
- Michael Stephens (disambiguation), several people
- Mitchell Stephens (disambiguation), several people
- Myles Stephens (born 1997), American basketball player
- Nathan Stephens (born 1988), Welsh athlete
- Niles Stephens, American politician
- Olin Stephens (1908–2008), American yacht designer
- Oswold Stephens (1896–1980), New Zealand teacher, chemist, and potter
- Philip Stephens (journalist), an associate editor of the Financial Times
- Sir Philip Stephens, 1st Baronet (1723–1809), British First Secretary of the Admiralty during the American Revolution
- Rayner Stephens (1805–1879), Scottish Methodist minister
- Red Stephens (1930–2003), American football player
- Richard Stephens (disambiguation), several people
- Richie Stephens (Richard Stephenson, born 1966), Jamaican singer and producer
- Robert Stephens (1931–1995), British actor
- Rockwell Stephens (1900–1982), American author and recreational skiing pioneer
- Rycklon Stephens (born 1978), Guyanese professional wrestler better known as Ezekiel Jackson
- Sammy Stephens (born 1957), American entertainer
- Samuel Stephens (disambiguation), several people
- Santo Stephens (born 1969), American football player
- Sarah Stephens (born 1990), Australian model and actress
- Simon Stephens (born 1971), British playwright
- Sloane Stephens (born 1993), American tennis player
- Stan Stephens (1929–2021), American politician
- Steve Stephens, U.S. television host and musician
- Suzanne Stephens (born 1946), American clarinetist and basset horn player, resident in Germany
- Thomas Stephens (historian) (1821–1875), Welsh historian and critic
- Toby Stephens (born 1969), British actor
- Uriah Smith Stephens (1821–1882), American labor leader
- Ursula Stephens (born 1954), Australian Senator
- Vern Stephens (1920–1968), American baseball player
- Warren Stephens (born 1957), American businessman of Stephens Inc.
- William Stephens (disambiguation), several people
- Willis Stephens (born 1955), American politician
- Woody Stephens (1913–1998), American thoroughbred horse racing trainer

== See also ==
- Justice Stephens (disambiguation)
- Senator Stephens (disambiguation)
- St. Stephens (disambiguation)
- Stephen (surname)
- Stephenson Surname
- Stevenson Surname
- Stinson (surname)
- Clan MacTavish - Stephens Associated Family Name (Sept)
