= Stevenson =

- Language: English

Origin
- Meaning: "son of Steven" (from Greek stephanos, meaning "crown")
- Region of origin: England

Other names
- Variant form: Stivenson

Stevenson is an English language patronymic surname meaning "son of Steven". Its first historical record is from pre-10th-century England. Another origin of the name is as a toponymic surname related to the place Stevenstone in Devon, England. There are variant spellings of the name, including Stephenson.

== Notable people sharing this surname include ==
- Adonis Stevenson (born 1977), Canadian boxer
- Alexander Campbell Stevenson (1802–1889), American politician and physician
- Alexandra Stevenson (born 1980), American tennis player
- Angus Stevenson (born 1959 or 1960), British lexicographer
- Anne Stevenson (1933–2020), American-British poet
- Anita Stevenson, English table tennis player
- B. W. Stevenson (1949–1988), American country pop singer and musician
- Ben Stevenson (disambiguation), multiple people
- Cal Stevenson (born 1996), American baseball outfielder
- Carter L. Stevenson (1817–1888), American soldier
- Charles Stevenson (disambiguation), multiple people
- Christine Wetherill Stevenson (1878–1922), heiress of the Pittsburgh Paint Company, dramatist and arts patron
- Coke Stevenson (1888–1975), American politician, Governor of Texas 1941–47
- Collette Stevenson (born 1969), Scottish politician
- Dani Stevenson (born 1980), American R&B singer
- DeShawn Stevenson (born 1981), American basketball player
- D. E. Stevenson (1892–1973), Scottish author
- Ebony Stevenson (born 2009), Australian wheelchair basketball player
- Elizabeth Stevenson (disambiguation), multiple people
- Eric Stevenson (disambiguation), multiple people
- Fox Stevenson (born Stanley Stevenson Byrne, 1993), English music producer
- Francis Seymour Stevenson, (1862–1938), MP for Eye (1885–1906)
- Frank A. Stevenson (born 1970), Norwegian computer game developer and cryptographer
- Gary E. Stevenson (born 1955), American religious leader
- Gerda Stevenson (born 1956), Scottish actress, director and writer
- Graeme Stevenson (1958–2022), Australian wildlife artist and television presenter
- Harold Stevenson (1929–2018), American painter
- Helen Stevenson (artist) (fl.1920–1935), Scottish artist and printmaker
- Henry Stevenson (1867–1945), Scottish rugby player and cricketer
- Hilda Stevenson (1893–1987), Australian philanthropist
- Ian Stevenson (1918–2007), Canadian psychiatrist and reincarnation researcher
- James Stevenson (died 1805), East India Company officer
- Jane Stevenson (born 1959), British historian
- Jane Stevenson (born 1971), British Member of Parliament elected 2019
- Jarin Stevenson (born 2005), American basketball player
- Jessica Hynes (née Stevenson) (born 1972), English writer and actress
- Jocelyn Stevenson, writer and producer
- John Stevenson (disambiguation), multiple people
- J. J. Stevenson (1831–1908), British architect of the late-Victorian era
- Juliet Stevenson (born 1956), English actress
- Katharine Lente Stevenson (1853–1919), American reformer, missionary, editor
- Kimberly Stevenson, American businesswoman
- Laura Stevenson (born 1984), American singer-songwriter
- Leigh Stevenson (1895–1989), Canadian air marshal
- Lewis Stevenson (disambiguation), multiple people
- Llanchie Stevenson, African-American ballet dancer
- Mandisa Stevenson (born 1982), American basketball player
- Marquez Stevenson (born 1998), American football player
- Mary Ashley Stevenson (born 2005), American basketball player
- McLean Stevenson (1927–1996), American actor
- Michael Ray Stevenson (born 1989), American rapper
- Monica Lisa Stevenson (born 1967), American gospel musician
- Morris Stevenson (1943–2014), Scottish footballer
- ND Stevenson (formerly Noelle, but currently Nate) (born 1991), American cartoonist
- Pamela Stevenson (born 1959), Kentucky House of Representatives, minority leader (as of 2025)
- Parker Stevenson (born 1952), U.S. television actor
- Peter Stevenson, Derry Gaelic footballer
- Ray Stevenson (political activist) (1919–2004), Canadian writer and political activist
- Ray Stevenson (born 1964), Northern Irish actor
- Rhamondre Stevenson (born 1998), American football player
- Robert Stevenson (disambiguation), multiple people
- Robin Stevenson, Canadian children's book writer
- Ronald Stevenson (1928–2015), Scottish composer
- Ronald Stevenson (cricketer) (1938–1999), Scottish cricketer
- Ronald Stevenson (rugby union) (1873–1934), Scottish rugby union player
- Ryan Stevenson (disambiguation), multiple people
- Sarah Hackett Stevenson (1841–1909), American physician
- Savannah Stevenson (born 1983), English musical theatre actress
- Shakur Stevenson (born 1997), American boxer
- Stewart Stevenson (born 1946), Scottish politician
- Susan N. Stevenson, American diplomat
- Teófilo Stevenson (1952–2012), Cuban boxer
- Thyra Stevenson (1944–2020), American politician
- Toby Stevenson (athlete) (born 1976), American pole vaulter
- Tom Stevenson (born 1951) British wine writer
- Tommy Stevenson (1914–1944), jazz trumpet player
- Trudy Stevenson (1944–2018), Zimbabwean politician
- Tyrique Stevenson (born 2000), American football player
- Venetia Stevenson (1938–2022), English-American actress
- Vernon K. Stevenson (1812–1884), American businessman
- William Bennet Stevenson (c. 1787 – c. 1830), British explorer

Middle name:

- James Stevenson Ewing (1835–1918), American lawyer and politician
- Solomon Stevenson Fleming (1812–1901), American politician and merchant
- Willie Stevenson Glanton (1922–2017), American politician

Extended families:

- Stevenson family from Illinois
  - Adlai Stevenson I (1835–1914), U.S. Vice President
  - Adlai Stevenson II (1900–1965), American politician, governor of Illinois
  - Adlai Stevenson III (1930–2021), U.S. Senator from Illinois
  - Lewis Stevenson (politician) (1868–1929), American politician from Illinois
  - McLean Stevenson (1929–1996), actor
- Scottish family of (mostly) lighthouse engineers
  - Alan Stevenson (1807–1865), lighthouse engineer
  - Charles Alexander Stevenson (1855–1950), lighthouse engineer
  - D. E. Stevenson (1892–1973), author
  - David Stevenson (engineer) (1815–1886), lighthouse engineer
  - David Alan Stevenson (1854–1938), lighthouse engineer
  - Robert Stevenson (civil engineer) (1772–1850), lighthouse engineer
  - Robert Alan Mowbray Stevenson (1847–1900), art critic
  - Robert Louis Stevenson (1850–1894), author of Treasure Island and Strange Case of Dr. Jekyll and Mr. Hyde
  - Thomas Stevenson (1818–1887), lighthouse designer
- Scottish family with links to Tyneside
  - Flora Stevenson (1839–1905) education reformer
  - J. J. Stevenson (1831–1908), architect
  - James Cochran Stevenson (1825–1905) chemical manufacturer and Member of Parliament
  - Louisa Stevenson (1835–1908), campaigner for women's causes
  - Nathaniel Stevenson (1840–1911), General and Governor of Guernsey
  - James Stevenson-Hamilton (1867–1957), 16th of Fairolm and Kruger National Park ranger
  - Hilda Runciman (1869–1956), MP for St. Ives, 1928–1929

== See Also ==
- Clan MacTavish - Stevenson Associated Family Name (Sept)
- Stephen (surname)
- Stephenson Surname
- Stephens Surname
- Stinson (surname)
