= Charles Stevens =

Charles Stevens may refer to:

- Charles Stevens (actor) (1893–1964), Apache/Mexican actor
- Charles Stevens (Australian politician) (1823–1883), New South Wales politician
- Charles Stevens (pastor) (1892–1982), founder and president of Piedmont Bible College
- Charles Stevens (serial killer) (born 1969), American serial killer
- Charles A. Stevens (1816–1892), U.S. representative from Massachusetts
- C. A. Stephens (Charles Asbury Stephens, 1844–1931), American writer
- Chuck Stevens (Charles Augustus Stevens Jr., 1918–2018), American baseball player
- Charles Cecil Stevens (1841–1909), British colonial administrator in Bengal
- C. C. Stevens (Charles Cyril Stevens, 1907–1974), British sound engineer
- Charles Edward Stevens (1927–2008), American scientist, professor, and veterinarian
- Charles F. Stevens (1934–2022), American neuroscientist
- Charles Isaac Stevens (1835–1917), American-born clergyman
- Charles Joseph Stevens (1841–1911), music teacher, conductor and choirmaster in South Australia
- Chas A. Stevens, or Charles A. Stevens, a Chicago department store

== See also ==
- Charles Stevens House, in Astoria, Oregon, U.S.
- Charles E. Stevens American Atheist Library and Archives, in Cranford, New Jersey, U.S.
- Charles Stephens (disambiguation)
