= Robert Stevens =

Robert, Rob(by), or Bob(by) Stevens may refer to:

== Business ==
- Robert J. Stevens (born 1951), American businessman, former chief executive officer of Lockheed Martin
- Robert L. Stevens (1787–1856), American shipbuilder and railroad executive

== Entertainment ==
- Robert Stevens, one of three pseudonyms for Robert Kellard (1915–1981), American actor
- Robert Stevens (director) (1920–1989), American film and television director ("Alfred Hitchcock Presents", etc.)
- Robert M. Stevens, cinematographer
- Bob Stevens (band), a Swedish dansband
- Bobby Stevens (singer) (born 1936), British singer also known by his real name Ray Pilgrim
- Bobby Stevens, member of the American R&B group Checkmates, Ltd.
- Robert Stevens (theater director) (1882–1963), theater actor and director

== Law and politics ==
- Robert Stevens (lawyer) (1933–2021), academic at various American universities and master of Pembroke College, Oxford
- Robert Stevens (legal scholar), professor of law at the University of Oxford
- Robert Stevens (Tennessee politician), American politician, Tennessee legislator
- Robert J. Stevens (born 1941/2), exonerated defendant associated with 2010 U. S. Supreme Court case United States v. Stevens
- Robert S. Stevens (politician) (1824–1893), American politician, U.S. representative from New York
- Robert S. Stevens (judge) (1916–2000), California politician, judge
- Robert T. Stevens (1899–1983), American businessman and politician, secretary of the Army, opposed Joseph McCarthy

== Sports ==
- Robert Stevens (baseball), 19th-century American baseball player
- Robert Stevens (Australian footballer) (born 1951), Australian footballer
- Robert Stevens (priest) (1777–1870), English cricketer and dean of Rochester, 1820–1870
- Bob Stevens (basketball) (1923–2012), American basketball coach
- Bob Stevens (golfer) (1928–2008), Australian amateur golfer
- Rob Stevens (kickboxer), British kickboxer
- Bob Stevens (sportscaster), American sportscaster
- Bob Stevens (sportswriter) (1916–2002), American sportswriter
- Bobby Stevens (1907–2005), American baseball player

== Others ==
- Robert Stevens (scientist) (born 1965), professor of computer science at the University of Manchester
- Robert Stevens (photo editor) (1938–2001), American photo editor, first fatality linked to the 2001 anthrax attacks
- Bobby Stevens, a main character in the CBS television series Smith
- Robert Stevens (Royal Navy officer) (born 1948), British admiral

== See also ==
- Robert Stephens (disambiguation)
- Robert Stevenson (disambiguation)
- Robert Stephenson (disambiguation)
