= Fitzstephen =

Origin
- Meaning: "son of Stephen"
- Region of origin: England

Other names
- Variant form: Stephen

Fitzstephen is an English language Hiberno-Norman surname. It is patronymic as the prefix Fitz- derives from the Old French filz (Modern French fils de), itself from Latin filius, meaning "son of". Its variants include FitzStephen, Fitz Stephen, Fitz-Stephen; alternate spelling Fitzstephens (common name in 16th century Ireland); and the given name turned surname Stephen. Fitzstephen is rare as a given name. People with the name Fitzstephen include:

- James Lynch fitz Stephen
- John Óge Lynch fitz Stephen
- Ralph fitzStephen
- Robert FitzStephen (fl. 1150), Welsh soldier
- Thomas FitzStephen (died 1120), Normandy, illegitimate son of sea captain for William the Conqueror
- William Fitzstephen (died 1191), servant of Thomas a Becket
