= Stephen (surname) =

- Pronunciation: Stee-ven

Origin
- Region of origin: English, Scottish and German

Other names
- Variant forms: Stephenson, Stevens, Stephens, Fitzstephen

Stephen is a surname of English, Scottish, and German origin. It is a reasonably common surname. The German variant is thought to have originated from the German-speaking world as (Von) Stephan.

Stephen is the 3,845th most common surname in the USA.

MacStèaphain (Scottish Gaelic) Stephen is a sept of the clan MacTavish. It is believed that Stephens from North East Scotland (Morayshire, Banffshire, and Aberdeenshire) south of the Moray Firth are descended from a Viking named Tarben whose longship landed in Banffshire in the late 10th century CE. His name was Christianized to Stephen.

== Notable people with the surname ==
- Stephen (Australian legal family), a prominent legal dynasty, includes

- Sir Alfred Stephen (1802–1894), Chief Justice of New South Wales
- Sir Colin Stephen (1872–1937), lawyer and horse racing administrator
- George Milner Stephen (1812–1894), Australian politician and faith healer
- Harold Stephen MLA (1841–1889), Australian politician
- Sir Henry Stephen (Matthew Henry Stephen 1828–1920), Puisne Judge in New South Wales
- James Wilberforce Stephen (1822–1881), judge of the Victorian Supreme Court
- Montagu Stephen MLA (1827–1872), solicitor and politician
- Septimus Alfred Stephen MLC (1842–1901), solicitor and politician

- A. G. Stephen (1862–1924), Hong Kong banker
- Caroline Emelia Stephen (1834–1909), British philanthropist and writer on Quakerism
- C. M. Stephen (1918–1984), Indian politician
- Elizabeth Willisson Stephen (1856-1925), American author
- George Stephen, 1st Baron Mount Stephen, Canadian businessman, financier, philanthropist
- George A. Stephen (c.1922–1993), American inventor and entrepreneur
- Harry Lushington Stephen, judge, alderman, writer
- Hugh R. Stephen (1913–2002), mayor of Victoria, BC, Canada
- James Stephen (disambiguation), several people

- James Stephen (architect) (1858–1938), American architect
- James Stephen (British politician) (1758–1832), British abolitionist lawyer and Member of Parliament
- Sir James Stephen (civil servant) (1789–1859), British under-secretary for the colonies, 1836–1847
- Sir James Fitzjames Stephen (1829–1894), British judge and anti-libertarian writer
- James Kenneth Stephen (1859–1892), English poet

- Jimmy Stephen (1922–2012), footballer
- Julia Stephen (1846–1895), English art model, wife of Leslie
- Leslie Stephen, English author, critic, historian, biographer, mountaineer, husband of Julia
- Marcus Stephen (born 1969), President of Nauru (2007–2011)
- Margaret Stephen (midwife), 18th-century British midwife and author
- Nicol Stephen, Scottish politician
- Ninian Stephen (1923–2017), Australian judge and Governor-General of Australia
- Norman Stephen (1865–1948), Scottish schoolmaster and cricketer
- Pamela Helen Stephen (1964–2021), English opera singer
- Patrick John Stephen (1864–1938), Methodist minister in Sydney, Australia
- Shamar Stephen, American football player
- Susan Stephen, English actor
- W. S. E. Stephen (died c. 1973), philatelist

== See also ==
- Stephen, given name
- Stephens Surname
- Stephenson Surname
- Stevenson Surname
- Stinson (surname)
- Clan MacTavish - Stephen Associated Family Name (Sept)
