= Hen 3-401 =

Planetary nebula in the constellation Carina

Nebula
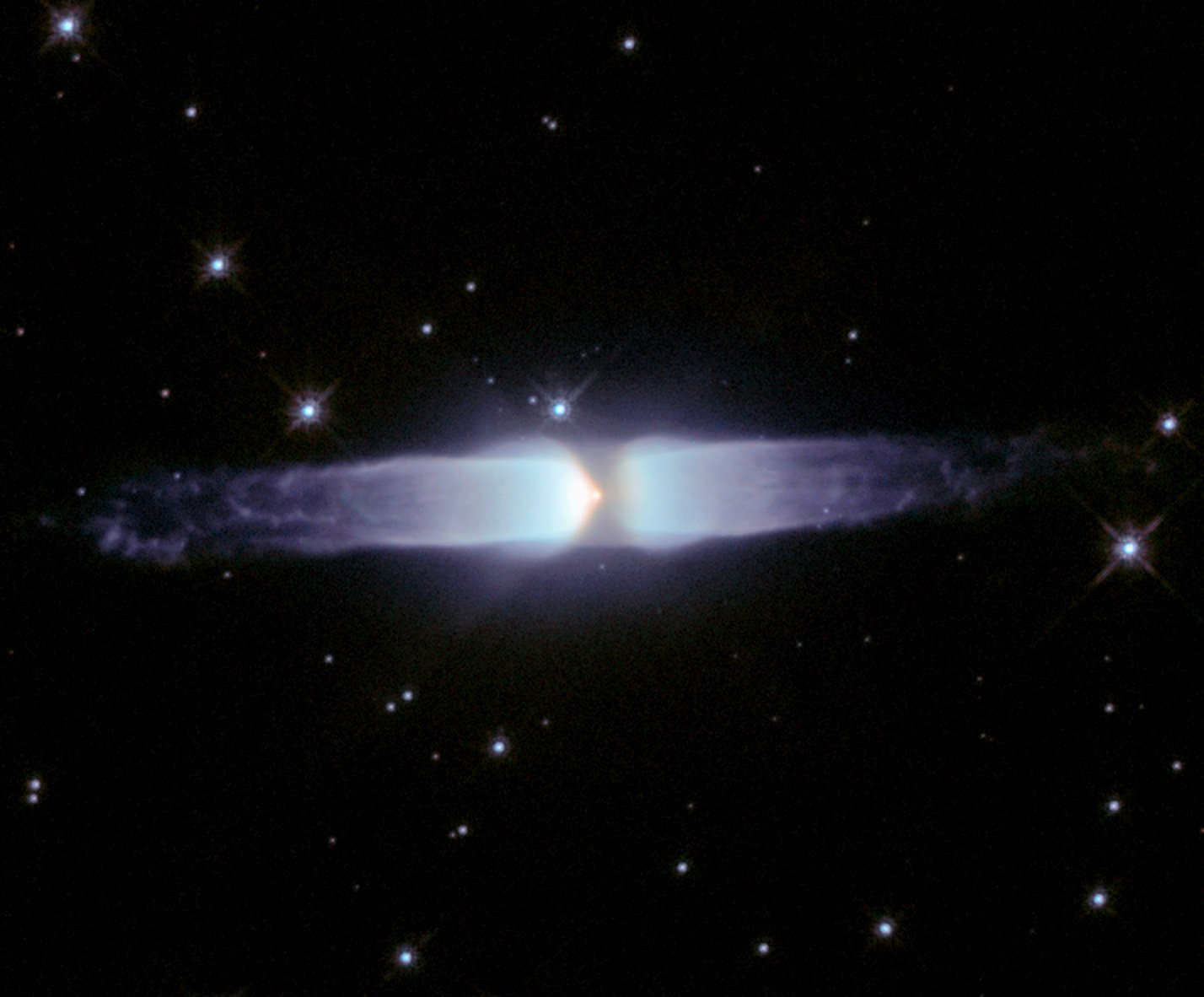
- Hen 3-401 imaged by Hubble Space Telescope

Observation data: J2000 epoch
- Right ascension: 10h 19m 32.501s
- Declination: -60° 13' 29.48"
- Distance: 10,000 ly
- Apparent magnitude (V): 12.5
- Constellation: Carina
- Designations: Henize 3-401, IRAS 10178-5958, PK 285-02 2, PN G285.1-02.7

Hen 3-401 (Henize 3-401) is an elongated planetary nebula located approximately 10,000 light years away in the constellation Carina. It is classified to be a bipolar nebula, as seen from its cylindrical jets. The nebula was discovered by astronomers Karl G. Henize, N. Sanduleak and C. B. Stephenson.

The central star in Hen 3-401 is a Be star with a temperature of 22,000 K. which suggest that the nebula might actually be a protoplanetary nebula.
