= Robert Stephens (disambiguation) =

Robert Stephens (1931–1995) was an English actor.

Robert Stephens may also refer to:

- Robert Estienne (1503–1559), a.k.a. Robert Stephens, French printer, and publisher
- Robert Stephens, one of three pseudonyms for Robert Kellard (1915–1981), American actor
- Robert Stephens (historian) (1665–1732), English historian, appointed historiographer royal in 1727
- Robert D. Stephens (born 1955), American amateur astronomer and photometrist
- Robert F. Stephens (1927–2002), justice of the Kentucky Supreme Court
- Robert Grier Stephens Jr. (1913–2003), American politician; United States Representative from Georgia
- Robert L. Stephens (1921–1984), American test pilot
- Robert Neilson Stephens (1867–1906), American novelist and playwright
- Robert Stephens (Geek Squad), American entrepreneur; founder of Geek Squad

== See also ==
- Robert Stevens (disambiguation)
- Robert Stephen (disambiguation)
- Robert Stevenson (disambiguation)
- Robert Stephenson (disambiguation)
