= Delta Lyrae =

The Bayer designation Delta Lyrae (δ Lyr / δ Lyrae) is shared by a star and a star system, in the constellation Lyra:

- δ¹ Lyrae
- δ² Lyrae

== See also ==
- Delta Lyrae cluster
