= Steenson =

Steenson is a surname and may refer to:

- Brian Steenson, former Grand Prix motorcycle road racer
- Gareth Steenson (born 1984), currently a Fly-half for Exeter Chiefs
- Gerard Steenson (1957–1987), Irish republican paramilitary in the Irish National Liberation Army (INLA) during the Troubles in Northern Ireland
- Jeffrey N. Steenson PA (born 1952), American prelate of the Roman Catholic Church, the first ordinary of the Personal Ordinariate of the Chair of Saint Peter
- Malachy Steenson, Irish far-right politician
- Molly Wright Steenson (born 1971), American professor of design and historian of architecture and technology
- Willie Steenson, a blind fiddler in Redgauntlet (1824), a historical novel by Sir Walter Scott

== See also ==
- Steens (disambiguation)
- Stenson
- Stevenstone
