= Charles Stephenson =

Charles Stephenson may refer to:

- Charles Bruce Stephenson (1929–2001), American astronomer
- Charles C. Stephenson Jr., American petroleum industry executive and philanthropist
- Charles Elwood Stephenson (1898–1965), Canadian politician
- Charles Stephenson (rower) (1865–?), New Zealand rowing champion
- Charles Skip Stephenson (1940–1992), American actor and comedian
- Charles W. Stephenson (1853–1924), English amateur international footballer

== See also ==
- Charles Stevenson (disambiguation)
