= James Stevens =

James Stevens may refer to:

== Politics ==
- James Stevens (Connecticut politician) (1768–1835), United States Representative from Connecticut
- James H. Stevens (1818–1856), mayor of Houston, Texas
- James G. Stevens (1822–1906), Scottish-born lawyer, judge and political figure in New Brunswick
- James Stevens (New York politician) (1836–1912), New York state politician
- James M. Stevens (1873–1937), Lieutenant Governor of Idaho, 1903–1905
- James Stevens (Australian politician) (born 1983), member of the Australian House of Representatives for Sturt

== Sport ==
- Jim Stevens (baseball) (1889–1966), American baseball player
- James Norman Stevens (1910–1993), English cricketer
- James A. Stevens (fl. 1949–1967), American college football coach
- James Stevens (soccer, born 1984), American soccer player
- James Stevens (footballer, born 1992), English footballer

== Others ==
- J. A. Stevens (James Algernon Stevens, 1873–1934), British customs officer in India
- James Stevens (writer) (1892–1971), American writer and songwriter
- James Hay Stevens (1913–1973), British aviation journalist and pilot
- James Stevens (composer) (1923–2012), English composer
- James C. Stevens (born 1953), American chemist at the Dow Chemical Company
- James Thomas Stevens (born 1966), American poet and academic

== Fictional characters ==
- James Stevens, or The Consultant, character used by the music group Cardiacs
- James Stevens, protagonist of the novel The Remains of the Day

== See also ==
- James Stephens (disambiguation)
- Jimmy Stevens (disambiguation)
- Jamie Stevens (born 1989), English footballer
