= John Stinson =

John Stinson may refer to:

- John Stinson (Canadian politician) (1764–1842), political figure in Upper Canada
- John O. Stinson (died 2021), American civil engineer and town administrator
- J. T. Stinson (John T. Stinson; 1866–1958), academic fruit specialist

== See also ==
- Jonathan Stinson (fl. 2000s–2010s), American singer and composer of opera
