= Delta Lyrae cluster =

Sparse open cluster in the constellation of Lyra

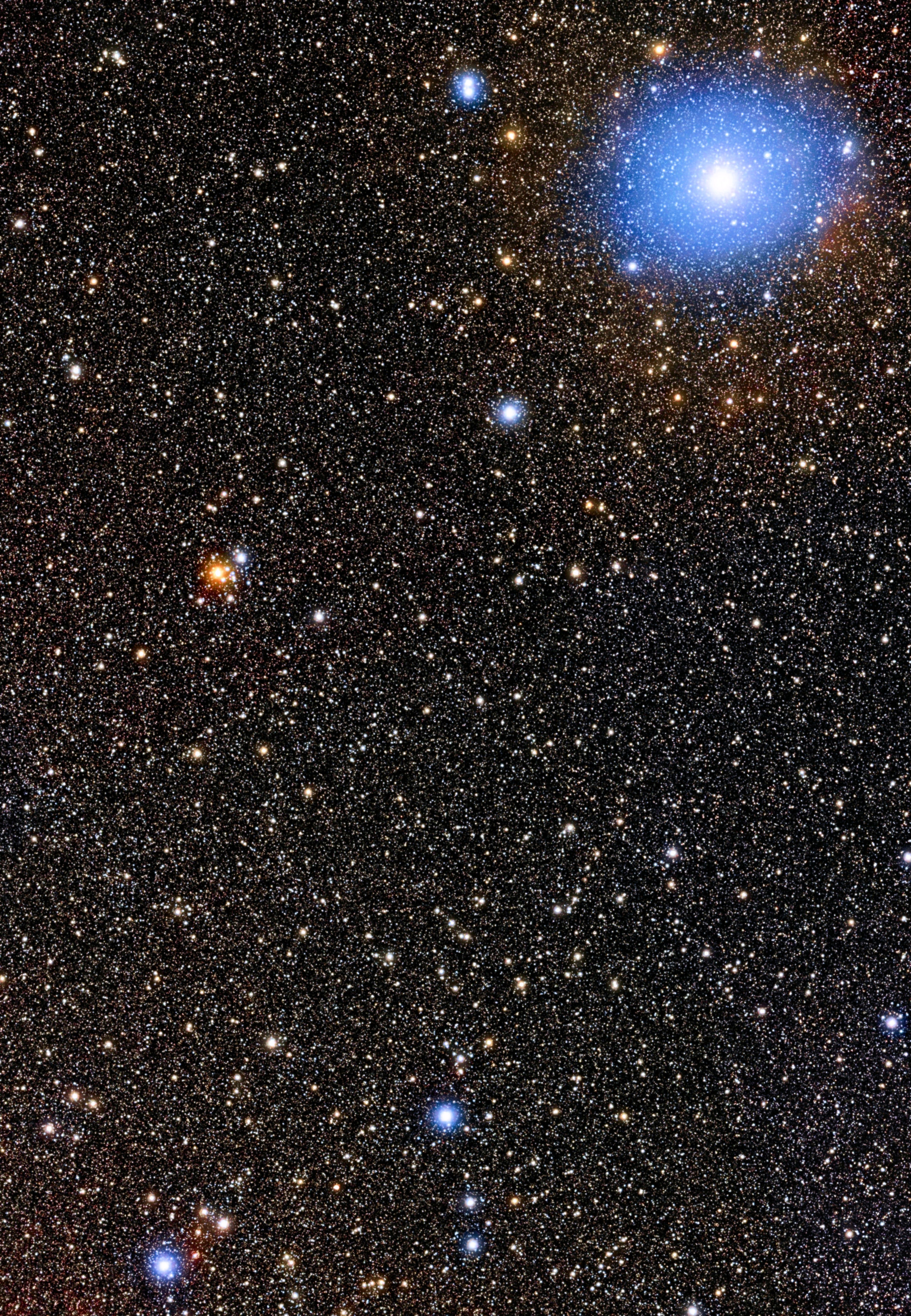
- Lyra with the δ Lyrae pair and surrounding cluster stars left of centre

Observation data (J2000 epoch)
- Right ascension: 18^{h} 53^{m} 30.(0)^{s}
- Declination: +36° 55′ 0(0)″
- Distance: 1,220 ly (373 pc)
- Apparent magnitude (V): 3.8
- Apparent dimensions (V): 20′

Physical characteristics
- Mass: 589 M_{☉}
- Estimated age: 49 Myr
- Other designations: Stephenson 1

Associations
- Constellation: Lyra

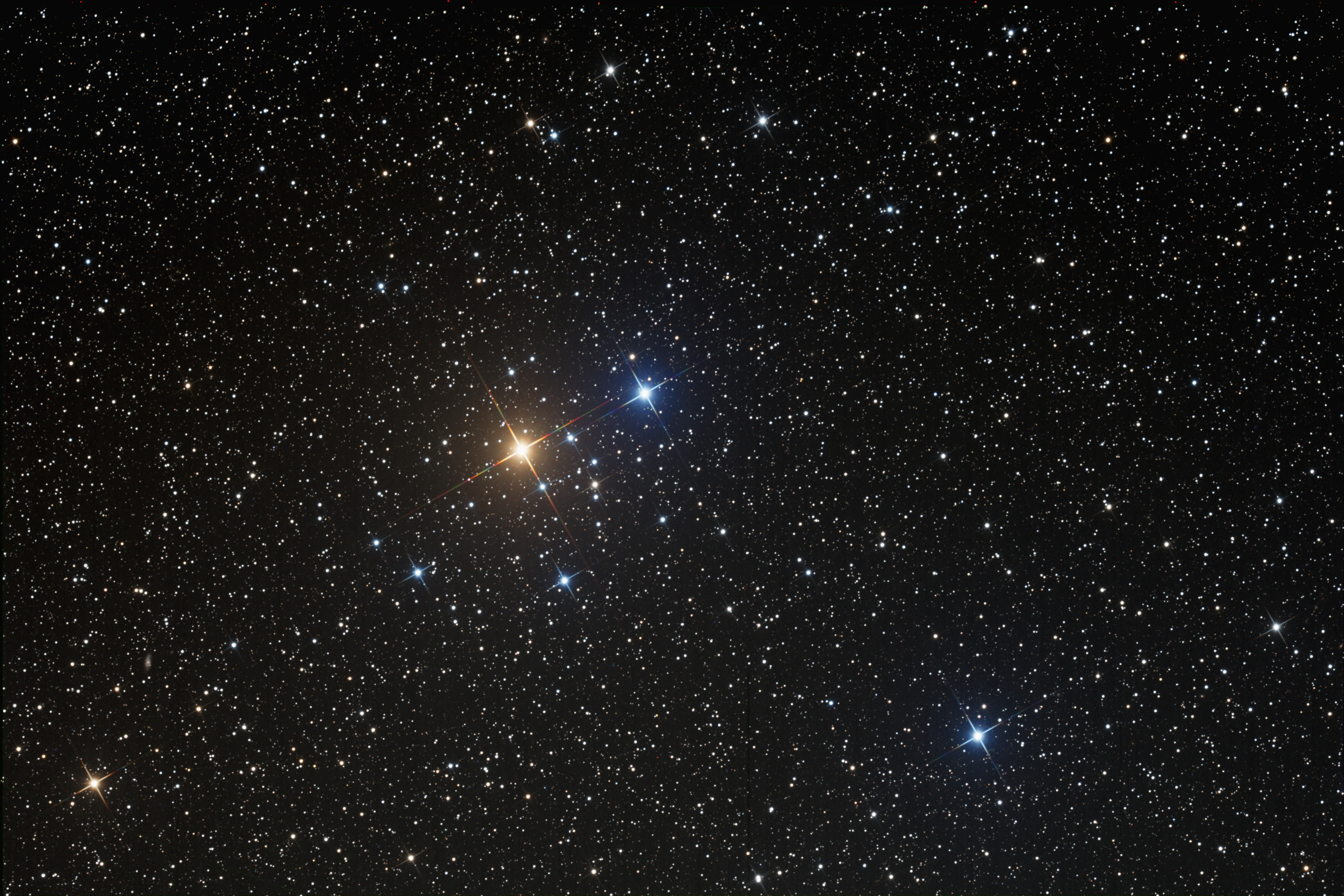
The cluster is dominated by the red giant δ^{2} Lyr and the hot blue δ^{1} Lyr.

The Delta Lyrae cluster or Stephenson 1 is a sparse open cluster of stars located about 1,220 light years away in the northern constellation of Lyra. Centered on the bright star Delta^{2} Lyrae for which it is named but not a member like Delta^{1} Lyrae is with 70% certainty.

This cluster was first suspected in 1959 by American astronomer Charles B. Stephenson, then was later concluded not to exist by German astronomer Werner Bronkalla in 1963. However, subsequent photometric observations at the Palomar and Mount Wilson observatories led American astronomer Olin J. Eggen to demonstrate that there was an actual cluster, at least for the observed stars down to absolute magnitude +5.5. Eggen's study found at least 33 members.

The cluster has a visual magnitude of 3.8 and spans an angular diameter of 20 arc minutes. The tidal radius of the cluster is 38 ly (11.5 pc) and it has an estimated combined mass of 589 times the mass of the Sun. Based upon its estimated age and motion through space, it may be associated with the Gould Belt. It includes an Algol variable star, BD+36° 3317, discovered in 2007 from Spain: this is a spectroscopic binary star system that undergoes regular eclipses because the orbital plane is nearly aligned with the line of sight to the Earth.

An exoplanet has been found orbiting the star Kepler-1627 in this cluster.

== See also ==
- Stephenson 2
