= Norman Stevens =

Norman Stevens may refer to:

- James Norman Stevens, English cricketer
- Norman Stevens (boxer) , Indigenous Australian boxer
- Norman D. Stevens, library administrator
