= Richard Stephens =

Richard Stephens may refer to:

- Richard Stephens (figure skater) (born 1947), Canadian figure skater
- Richard Stephens of Eastington (died 1599), English lawyer and Member of Parliament
- Richard Stephens (burgess) (1585–1636), burgess of the Jamestown Settlement
- Richard Stephens (judge) (c. 1630–1692), Irish barrister, politician and judge
- Richard Stephens (pioneer) (1755–1831), American Revolutionary War soldier, politician and slave-plantation owner
- Richard Stephens, member of The String-A-Longs

== See also ==
- Richard Stevens (disambiguation)
- Richie Stephens (Richard Stephenson, born 1966), Jamaican singer and producer
- Stephens (surname)
