= Delta2 Lyrae =

Red giant star in the constellation Lyra

δ^{2} Lyrae
- Location of δ^{2} Lyrae (circled)

Observation data Epoch J2000.0 Equinox ICRS
- Constellation: Lyra
- Right ascension: 18^{h} 54^{m} 30.28269^{s}
- Declination: +36° 53′ 55.0317″
- Apparent magnitude (V): 4.22 – 4.33

Characteristics
- Evolutionary stage: AGB
- Spectral type: M4 II
- U−B color index: +1.65
- B−V color index: +1.68
- Variable type: SRc?

Astrometry
Radial velocity (R_{v})	−25.55 km/s
Proper motion (μ)	RA: −6.598 mas/yr Dec.: 1.953 mas/yr
Parallax (π)	4.2352±0.2951 mas
Distance	770+68 −42 ly (237+21 −13 pc)
Absolute magnitude (M_{V})	−3.3

Details
Mass	4.5±1 M_{☉}
Radius	293+19 −22 R_{☉}
Luminosity	10,248±1,500 L_{☉}
Surface gravity (log g)	0 cgs
Temperature	3,394±32 K
Age	75 (Note: For a mass of 6 solar masses.) Myr

Other designations
- Jiantai, δ ^{2} Lyr, 12 Lyr, BD+36°3319, GC 25959, HD 175588, HIP 92791, HR 7139, SAO 67559

Database references
SIMBAD	data

Delta^{2} Lyrae (δ^{2} Lyr), also named Jiantai, is a 4th magnitude star in the constellation Lyra, approximately 770 light years away from Earth. It is visible to the naked eye. It is one of the M4II spectral standard stars.

== Nomenclature ==
Delta^{2} Lyrae (Latinized from δ^{2} Lyrae, abbreviated δ^{2} Lyr) is the star's Bayer designation. In Chinese astronomy, this star is part of the asterism Jiàn Tái (Clepsydra Terrace, 漸台), which represents timekeeping with water clocks. The IAU Working Group on Star Names adopted the name Jiantai for this star on 18 June 2026, after this Chinese constellation.

== Characteristics ==
It began life as a hot blue main sequence star, but now is a large cool asymptotic giant branch star with a degenerate carbon-oxygen core. It is a semi-regular variable star that has its brightness change by 0.2 magnitudes over an ill-defined period. Delta^{2} Lyrae was a 5.0 M_{☉} star when still in the main sequence, but due to stellar mass loss it has lost 0.5 solar masses. The star's photosphere has expanded to 290 times the size of the Sun, and is now radiating 10,200 times the luminosity of the Sun. It has cooled to 3,394 K (3,121 °C), giving Delta^{2} Lyrae a reddish hue typical of M-type stars.

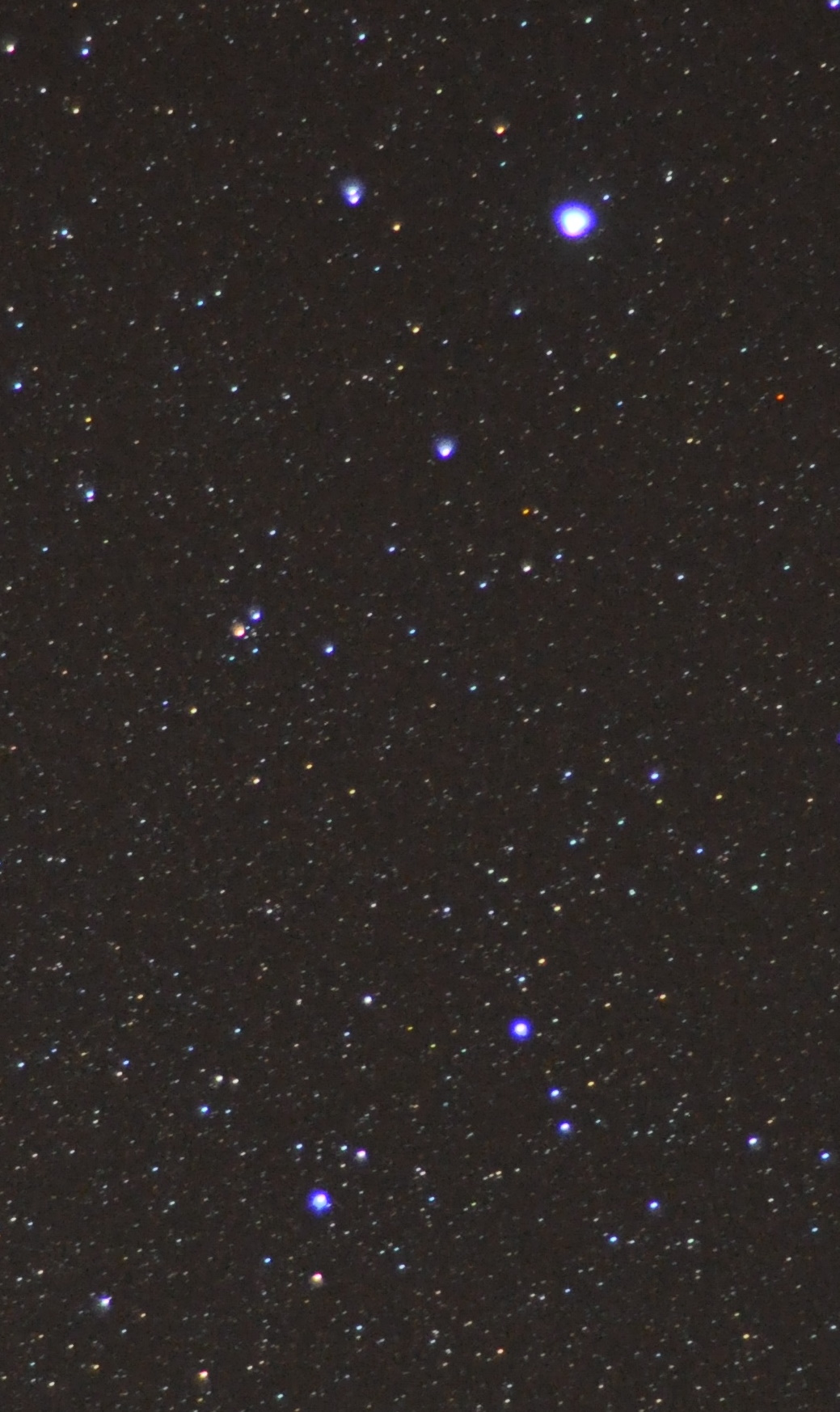
Lyra with the δ Lyrae pair and surrounding cluster stars left of centre

It is the brightest member of the scattered open cluster Stephenson 1, also known as the δ Lyrae Cluster. Other known members include δ^{1} Lyrae, a handful of 8th-9th magnitudes stars, and at least thirty other stars down to 14th magnitude.

== Variability ==
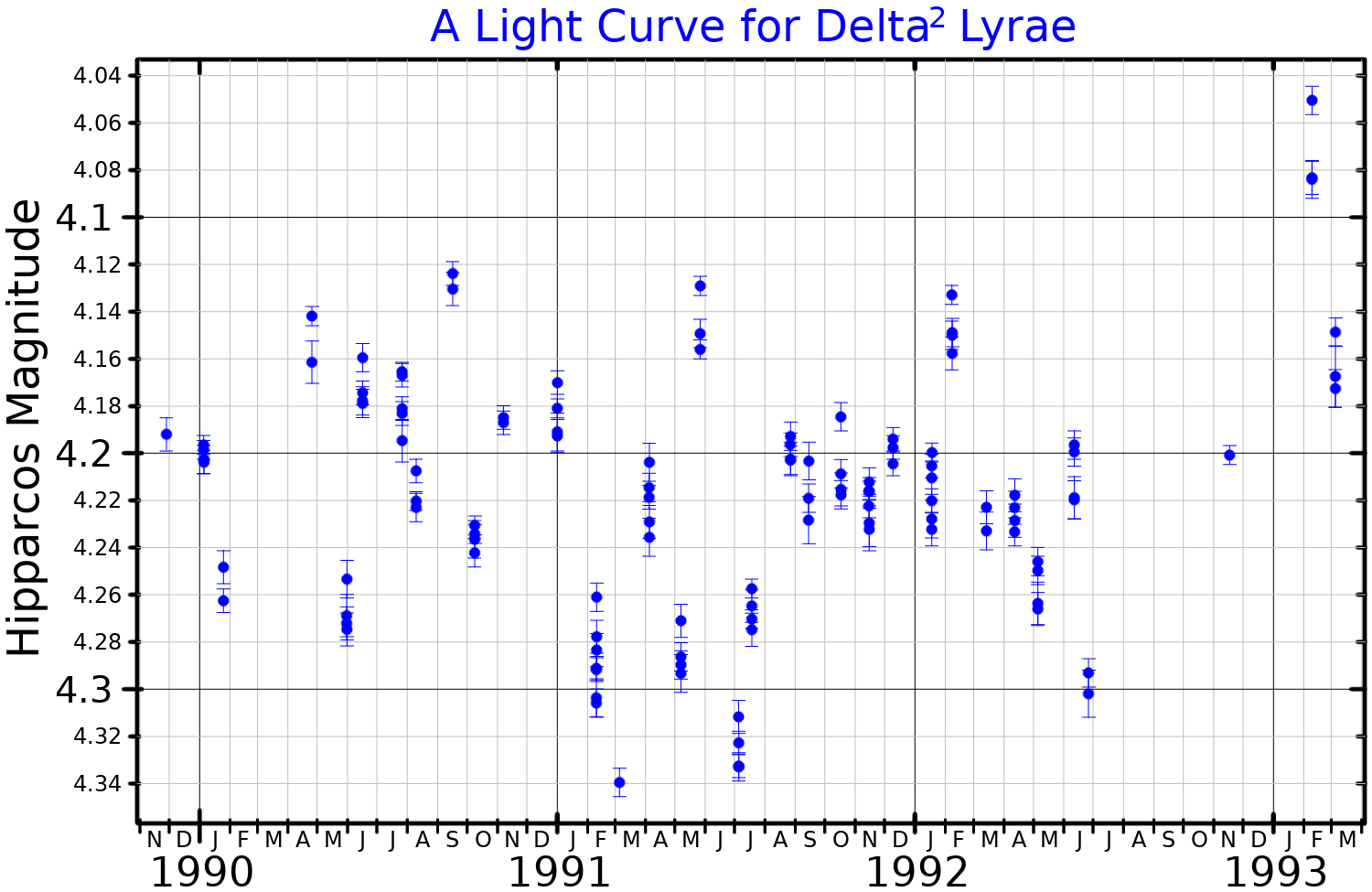
A light curve for Delta^{2} Lyrae, plotted from Hipparcos data

δ^{2} Lyrae is a variable star, probably a semiregular variable. It has a magnitude range of 4.22 to 4.33.

== Companion stars ==
Multiple star catalogues list several companions to δ^{2} Lyrae, with designations such as ADS 11825. Two of them are a close pair of 10th magnitude stars about 87" from δ^{2}, designated components B and C. The spectral type of the pair suggests that they are at the same distance as Delta^{2} Lyrae, which could mean that the three stars form a triple star system. In this case, the ADS 11825BC pair would be 24,000 AU away from δ^{2} Lyrae, and it would take 24,000 years for it to make an orbit. The two stars in the BC system take at least 10,500 years to make an orbit and are separated by 600 AU.

Delta^{2} Lyrae was once thought to form a visual binary with the star Delta^{1} Lyrae, but it does not, only appearing to do so if seen from Earth's direction.
