= Louis Stevens =

Louis Stevens may refer to:

- Louis Stevens, a character in the TV series Even Stevens
- Louis Stevens (writer) (1896–1966), American screenwriter

== See also ==
- Lewis Stevens (born 1936), British politician
- Lewis M. Stevens (1898–1963), lawyer and politician from Philadelphia
- Red Stephens (Louis Edmund Stephens, 1930–2003), American football player
- Lewis Stevenson (disambiguation)
