= Richard Stevens =

Richard Stevens may refer to:

- Richard Stevens (MP) (1702–1776), English politician, MP for Calling 1761–68
- Richard Stevens (tennis), American tennis player
- Richard Stevens (lawyer) (1868–1919), American lawyer and real estate developer
- Richard Y. Stevens (born 1948), American politician in North Carolina
- W. Richard Stevens (1951–1999), author of Unix and networking books
- Richard Stevens (cartoonist), author of the web comic Diesel Sweeties
- Richard Henry Stevens (1893–1967), British intelligence officer captured during the Venlo incident
- R. J. S. Stevens (1757–1837), London composer-organist; Gresham Professor of Music from 1801
- Richard Stevens (Falkland Islands politician) (born 1955), Falkland Islands politician
- Richard L. Stevens, U.S. Army Corps of Engineers officer
- Dick Stevens (1948–2026), American football player
- Rick Stevens (1940–2017), first lead vocalist of Tower of Power

== See also ==
- Richard Steevens (1653–1710), physician, gave rise to Dublin's Dr. Steevens' Hospital
- Richard Stephens (disambiguation)
- Stevens (surname)
