= Stephen Lynch fitz James =

Stephen Lynch fitz James, Mayor of Galway, fl. 1499–1524.

Lynch is believed to have been the son of James Lynch fitz Stephen, Mayor 1493–94. He and Peter French were the town bailiffs from 1499–1500 under Mayor James Lynch fitz Martin. Stephen served three terms as Mayor: 1509–10, 1516–17 and 1523. During his first term he passed a statute penalising anyone who kept any swine or goats in town for more than 14 days.

== See also ==
- Galway
- Tribes of Galway
- Mayors of Galway

Civic offices
Preceded by Stephen Lynch fitz Dominick Dubh	Mayor of Galway; 1509–1510	Succeeded by James Lynch fitz Stephen

Civic offices
Preceded by James Lynch fitz Stephen	Mayor of Galway; 1516–1517	Succeeded by Stephen Lynch fitz Dominick Dubh

Civic offices
Preceded by Stephen Lynch fitz Dominick Dubh	Mayor of Galway; 1523–1524	Succeeded by Adam Font
