= John Óge Lynch fitz Stephen =

John Óge Lynch fitz Stephen, Mayor of Galway 1552–53.

== Information ==
Lynch was elected mayor in August 1552 and sworn into office in September. He passed into town law a statute ordering that no person could approach any child or apprentice with a contract of work without first approaching the child's father or guardians.

== Notes ==
- History of Galway, James Hardiman, Galway, 1820.
- Old Galway, Maureen Donovan O'Sullivan, 1942.
- Henry, William (2002). Role of Honour: The Mayors of Galway City 1485-2001. Galway: Galway City Council. OCLC 51023721 ASIN B003NECRYW
- Martyn, Adrian (2016). The Tribes of Galway: 1124-1642

Civic offices
Preceded by John Óge Lynch	Mayor of Galway; 1551–1552	Succeeded by Patrick Lynch
