= Stivenson =

Stivenson is a patronymic surname literally meaning "son of Stiven. Notable people with the name include:

- Bessie Stivenson, executed for witchcraft in Stirling, Scotland
- Kristofer Stivenson, Greek swimmer

== Fictional characters ==
- Robert Stivenson in the 1982 Russian film Resident Return

== See also ==
- Stevenson Magloire, Haitian painter, whose name is often misspelled as Stivenson
