= Stinson (surname) =

Stinson is an English and Scottish surname. There are many variants, including Stephenson, Stevenson, and Steenson. The Stinson family first landed in Glasgow around the year 1100, from Denmark, changing their name of "Stenson" to Anglicize it.

Notable people with the surname include:

- Albert Stinson (1944–1969), American jazz double-bassist
- Andrea Stinson (born 1967), basketball player
- Bess Stinson (1902-1996), Arizona state legislator
- Bob Stinson (1959–1995), founding member and lead guitarist for the American rock band The Replacements
- Darrel Stinson (born 1945), retired politician in British Columbia, Canada
- Doug Stinson Canadian mathematician and cryptographer
- Ford E. Stinson, Louisiana state legislator
- G. E. Stinson, American guitarist and founding member of new age / electronic musical group Shadowfax
- Harry Stinson, real estate developer in Toronto, Canada
- Harry Stinson (musician), American multi-instrumentalist
- Harry Edward Stinson (1898–1975), sculptor
- J. T. Stinson, 20th century fruit specialist and the first director of the Missouri State Fruit Experiment Station
- Jonathan Stinson (born 1978), American opera singer and composer
- Katherine Stinson (1891–1977), fourth woman in the United States to obtain a pilot's certificate
- Kathy Stinson, Canadian children's writer
- Lloyd Stinson (1904–1976), politician in Manitoba, Canada
- Marvin Stinson, American boxer
- Thomas Stinson (1798–1864), Ontario merchant, banker & land owner
- Thomas Henry Stinson, Ontario MPP
- Tommy Stinson (born 1966), American bassist (brother of Bob Stinson) who was a founding member of the American rock band The Replacements and later a member of Guns N' Roses until 2015
- Tyler Stinson (born 1986), American mixed martial artist
- Walton Stinson (born 1948), American sound engineer and businessman

Fictional characters:

- Barney Stinson, a fictional character in the American TV series How I Met Your Mother

== See Also ==
- Clan MacTavish - Stinson Associated Family Name (Sept)
