= Richard L. Stevens =

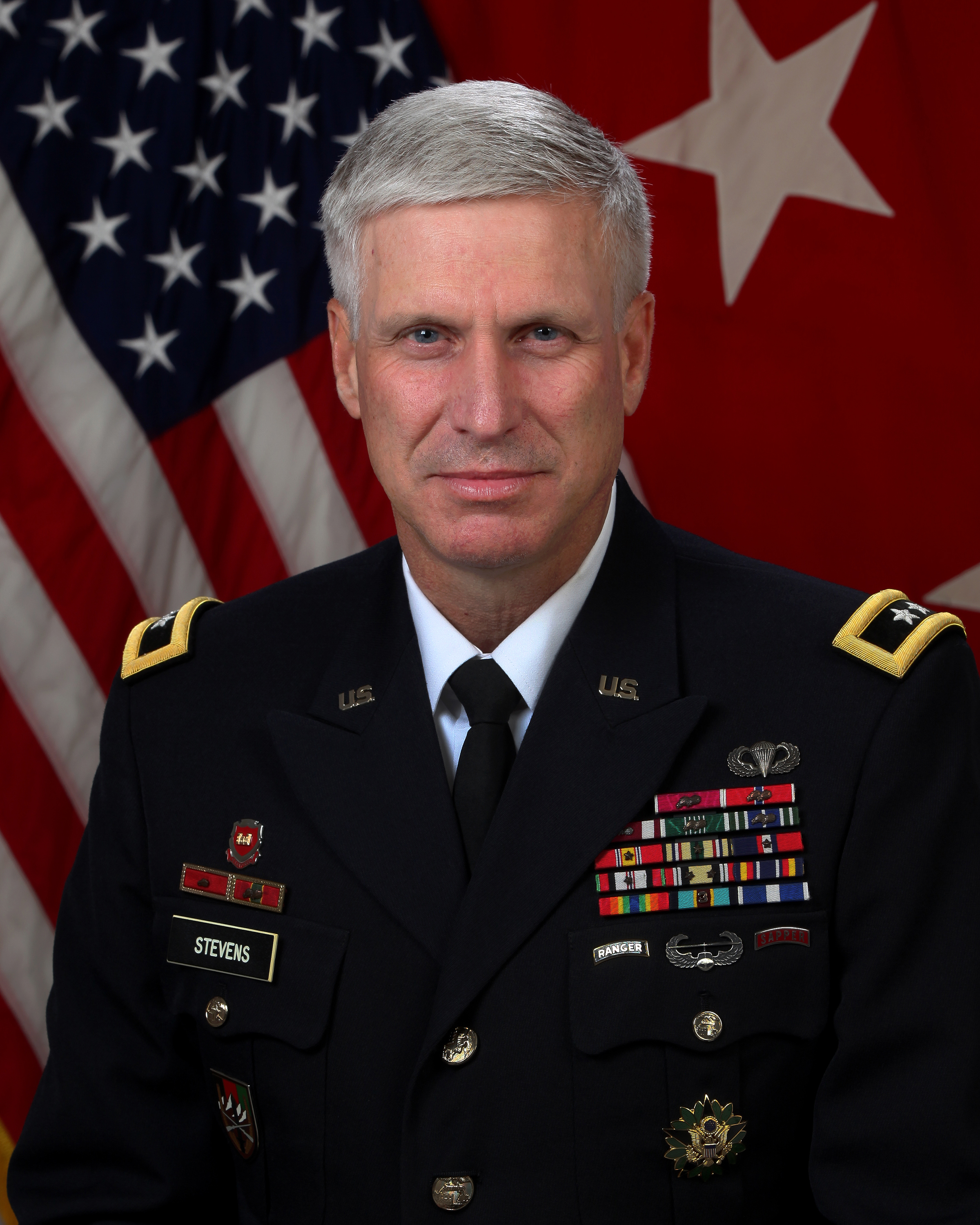
- Military career
- Allegiance: United States
- Branch: United States Army
- Service years: 1982–2017
- Rank: Major General
- Commands: Pacific Ocean Division; 36th Engineer Brigade; 11th Engineer Battalion
- Conflicts: Iraq War; War in Afghanistan
- Awards: Army Distinguished Service Medal; Legion of Merit (3); Bronze Star Medal (3)

Major General Richard Lee "Rick" Stevens is a retired United States Army officer. He served as Deputy Chief of Engineers and Deputy Commanding General of the United States Army Corps of Engineers from 2014 to 2017, and was previously the 30th Commander and Division Engineer for the Pacific Ocean Division.

== Early life ==
Stevens is from Vincennes, Indiana. He graduated from the United States Military Academy at West Point in 1982. He also holds Masters of Science degrees in Applied Mathematics from Purdue University and National Security Strategy from the National War College. He also served as an Army Senior Military Fellow at the Brookings Institution in Washington, DC.

== Military career ==
Upon graduation from West Point, Stevens received his commission as an Engineer officer. He has held a variety of command and staff positions including service with the 101st Airborne Division (Air Assault) at Fort Campbell, Kentucky, Department of Mathematical Sciences at West Point, New York, Third United States Army in Kuwait and both the 24th and 3rd Infantry Divisions at Fort Stewart, Georgia.

Stevens commanded the 11th Engineer Battalion at Fort Stewart, Georgia and the 36th Engineer Brigade at Fort Hood, Texas. He has served multiple duty assignments within the Headquarters, Department of the Army at the Pentagon, most notably with the Army G-8, Office of the Chief of Engineers, and culminating with his most recent assignment as the Executive Officer to the 36th Army Chief of Staff.

Steven's operational assignments included service in Kosovo, Iraq and Afghanistan.

=== Division Engineer ===
Stevens became the 30th Commander and Division Engineer for the Pacific Ocean Division of the United States Army Corps of Engineers on June 30, 2011. He became the Deputy Chief of Engineers and Deputy Commanding General of the United States Army Corps of Engineers on September 2, 2014.

As the Division Engineer, Stevens was responsible for a mission that includes engineering design, construction and real estate management for the Army in Hawaii, Army and Air Force in Alaska, and for all Department of Defense agencies in Japan, the Republic of Korea, and Kwajalein Atoll, Marshall Islands. Pacific Ocean Division administers the Corps’ federal water resource development program and waters and wetlands regulatory programs in Alaska, Hawaii, American Samoa, Guam, and the Commonwealth of the Northern Mariana Islands. The Division program includes the $10 billion multi-year Korea Transformation Program and the $9 billion multi-year Japan Defense Program Realignment Initiative. Pacific Ocean Division also supports U.S. Pacific Command and U.S. Army Pacific's Theater Security Cooperation strategies, Humanitarian Assistance Program, and Civil Military Emergency Preparedness with projects throughout the Asia Pacific region.

== Personal life ==
Stevens is married to the former Terri Steckler, also from Vincennes, and they have three children; Matthew, Keller, and Aly.

In politics, Stevens attempted to run as a Democrat against Larry Bucshon in 2018 but was blocked from standing. He claimed that he was "politically independent in the military, describing himself as a fiscal conservative who is progressive on social and environmental issues."
