= Jimmy Stevens =

Jimmy Stevens may refer to:

- Jimmy Stevens (politician) (died 1994), Ni-Vanuatu nationalist and politician
- Jimmy Stevens (musician) (born 1942), English singer-songwriter and musician
- Jimmy Stevens (rugby union) (born 1991), English rugby union player

== See also ==
- James Stevens (disambiguation)
