= Left on Labrador =

Left on Labrador, alternatively titled The Cruise of the Schooner-yacht Curlew, is a novel by author C. A. Stephens as part of his Camping-Out Series. It was first published by James R. Osgood in 1872, and later by the New York Hurst and Company Publishers in 1873.
