= Justice Stevens (disambiguation) =

Justice Stevens (John Paul Stevens, 1920–2019) was an associate justice of the Supreme Court of the United States.

Justice Stevens may also refer to:

- Correale Stevens (born 1946), associate justice of the Supreme Court of Pennsylvania
- E. Ray Stevens (1869–1930), associate justice of the Wisconsin Supreme Court
- Harold A. Stevens (1907–1990), judge of the New York Court of Appeals
- Stephen Stevens (1793–1870), associate justice of the Supreme Court of Indiana
- Truman S. Stevens (1867–1950), associate justice of the Iowa Supreme Court

== See also ==
- Judge Stevens (disambiguation)
- Justice Stephens (disambiguation)
