= Ryan Stephenson =

Ryan Stephenson may refer to:

- Ryan Stephenson, Bones character played by David Gallagher
- Ryan Stephenson, councillor elected in the 2016 Leeds City Council election

== See also ==
- Ryan Stevenson (disambiguation)
