= Judge Stephens =

Judge Stephens may refer to:

- Albert Lee Stephens Jr. (1913–2001), judge of the United States District Courts for the Southern and Central Districts of California
- Albert Lee Stephens Sr. (1874–1965), judge of the United States Court of Appeals for the Ninth Circuit
- Harold Montelle Stephens (1886–1955), judge of the United States Court of Appeals for the District of Columbia Circuit
- William Stephens (judge) (1752–1819), judge of the United States District Court for the District of Georgia

== See also ==
- Justice Stephens (disambiguation)
- Judge Stevens (disambiguation)
