= Woodrush High School =

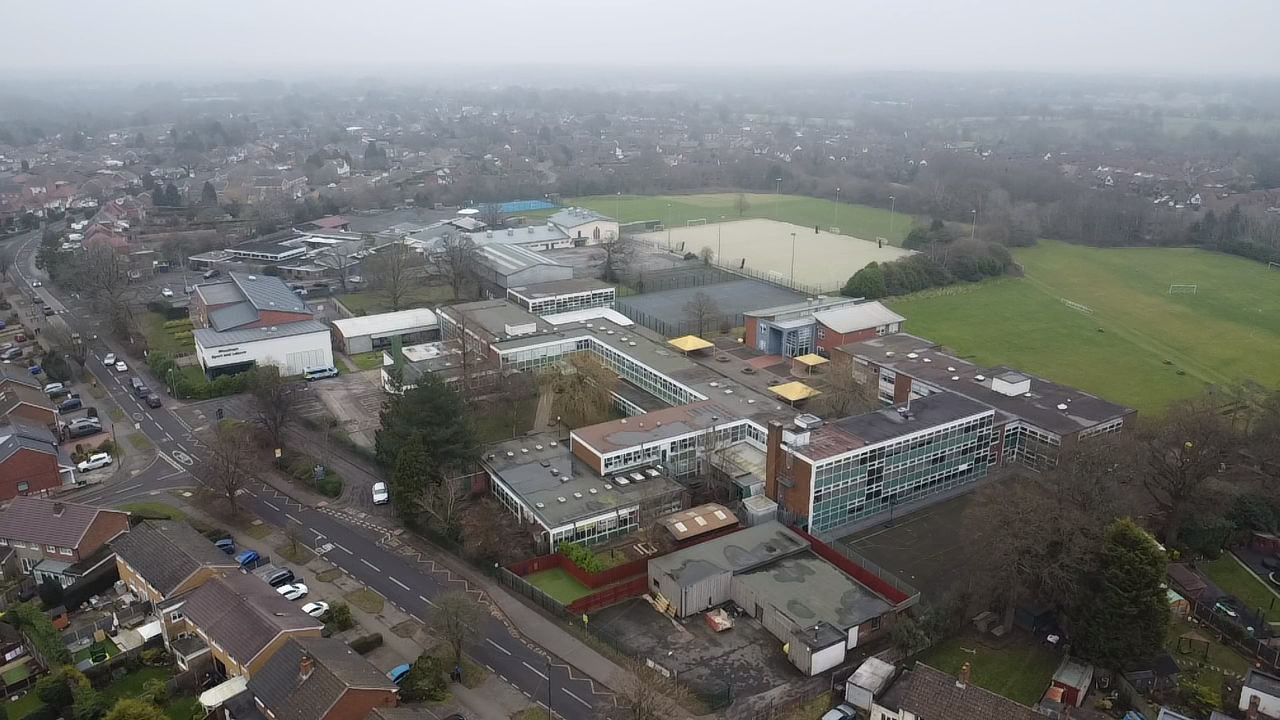
- Woodrush High School and Community Hub, and the Coppice Primary School, Hollywood

Location
- Shawhurst Lane; Hollywood, Worcestershire, B47 5JW; England; 52.3882°N 1.8787°W

Information
- Type: Academy
- Motto: Excellence through Endeavour
- Established: 1958
- School district: Bromsgrove and Redditch
- Local authority: Worcestershire
- Department for Education URN: 136924 Tables
- Ofsted: Reports
- Chair: Professor Stuart Brand
- Headteacher: J Barber
- Gender: Mixed
- Age: 11 to 18
- Enrolment: 1008
- Capacity: 1020
- Sixth form students: 100
- Houses: Brindley, Cadbury, Eliot and Lanchester
- Colours: Black and Green
- Website: http://www.woodrush.org

Woodrush High School is a mixed secondary school and sixth form located in the parish of Wythall in the English county of Worcestershire.

Woodrush High School offers GCSEs, BTECs and Cambridge Nationals as programmes of study for pupils, while students in the sixth form have the option to study from a range of A-levels and further BTECs. As of 2018, the school also started enrolling higher ability students onto the Mandarin Excellence programme.

As of the most recent Ofsted inspection published in April 2024, the school has 1008 enrolled pupils of its 1020 capacity, 100 of whom are in the Sixth Form. As of the latest full inspection, published January 2019, the school were graded overall 'good' with 'outstanding' development, behaviour, welfare, and leadership & management, .

The schools catchment area closely matches the Wythall Parish Council area boundary, with the exception of a c.3.75 square kilometre area around Forhill and Redhill Road, and a smaller area at Weatheroak Hill. The school takes applications from within this catchment area, as well as all students finishing at the Coppice Primary School (adjacent), Meadow Green Primary School, Hollywood Primary School, and Tidbury Green School, regardless of their address, but closest applicants take priority.

== School history ==
Established in 1958, it later became a foundation school administered by Worcestershire County Council. In July 2011 Woodrush High School converted to academy status, but continues to coordinate with Worcestershire County Council for admissions.

In November 2019, the school was close to partially shutting down due to an outdated boiler and heating system. Parents had attempted to fundraise £60,000 through a GoFundMe page, after multiple requests for Condition Improvement Funding were rejected. However the matter was resolved after Sajid Javid, (now former) Bromsgrove MP and Chancellor of the Exchequer, visited the school. An Urgent Capital Support application was submitted, leading to the Department for Education providing an emergency fund for the school.

In March 2020, the school was forced to temporarily close due to government guidelines surrounding COVID-19, with remote learning undertaken through online services.

== Academic success ==
In 2018/19 exams 44% of the pupils obtained a level 5 grade or higher in both English and Maths GCSEs, 1% higher than the national average and an improvement by 1% from the 2017/18 exams. Overall, 62 grade 9s were received with 11 in History, 9 in Chemistry and 7 in Maths. Also, last year, students from the sixth form achieved 41% A* to C grades along with a 100% pass rate.

== School awards ==
- 2010 - 2013 British Council International School Award
- 2015 - 2016 Discovering Democracy Award
- 2016 Prince's Teaching Institute - Geography
- 2016 Prince's Teaching Institute - History
- St John Ambulance School Mark
- The Healthy Schools Award
- Silver Eco Schools Award

== Notable former pupils ==
- Nick Rhodes, musician
- Eniola Aluko, footballer
- Sone Aluko, footballer
- Parry Glasspool, actor
- Devon Winters, musician and actor AKA Su Yaka
- Rob Stevens, World Champion kickboxer
- Lloyd Glasspool, Tennis player
