= Stephensport, Kentucky =

Unincorporated community in Kentucky, United States

- Unincorporated community
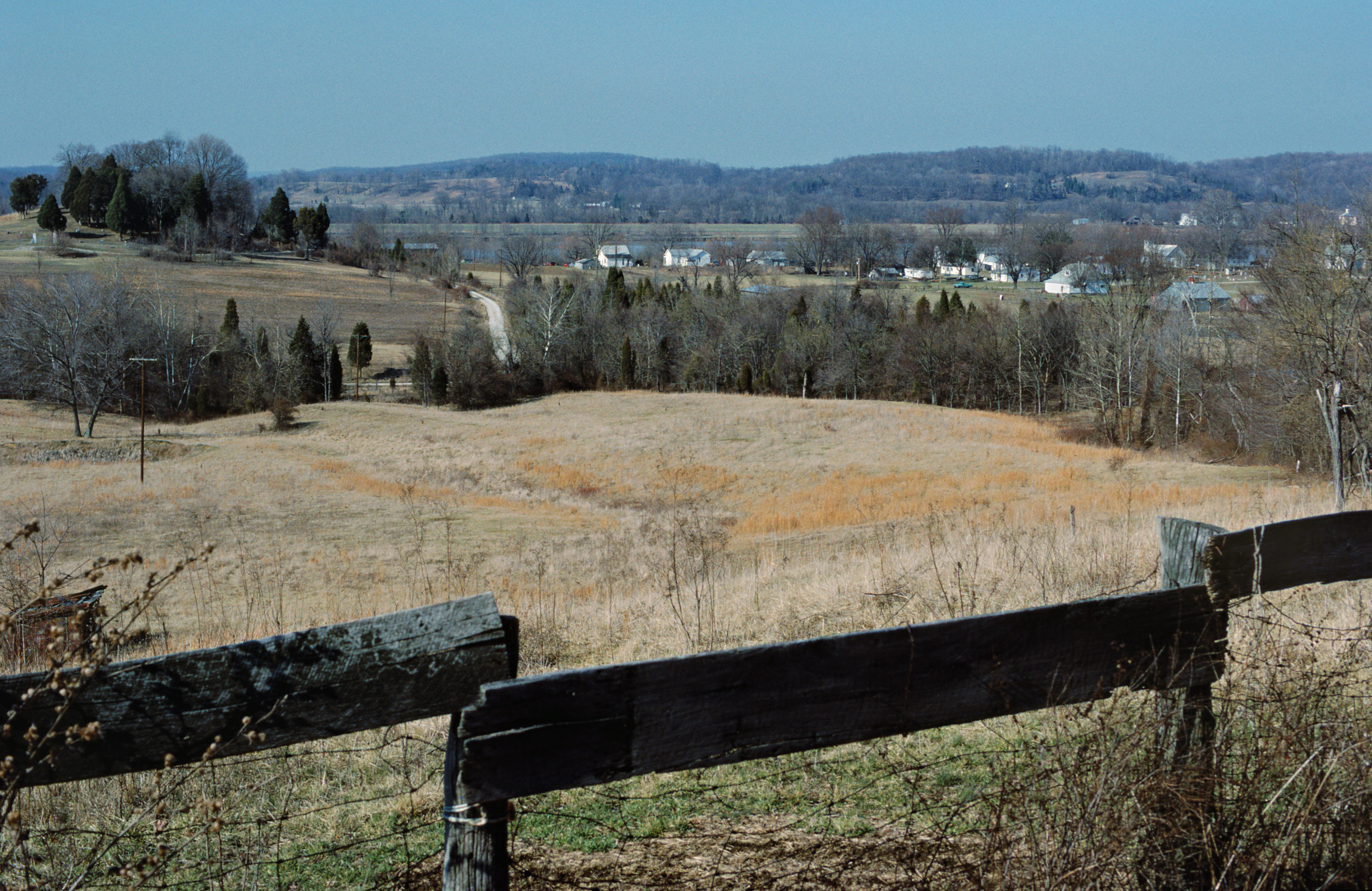
- Fence and field near Stephensport, Kentucky

- Location within Kentucky Location within the United States
- Coordinates: 37°54′45″N 86°31′38″W
- Country: United States
- State: Kentucky
- County: Breckinridge
- Elevation: 430 ft (130 m)
- Time zone: UTC-6 (Central (CST))
  - Summer (DST): UTC-5 (CDT)
- ZIP code: 40170
- Area code: 270
- GNIS feature ID: 515690

Stephensport is an unincorporated community in Breckinridge County, Kentucky, United States.

== Climate ==
The climate in this area is characterized by hot, humid summers and generally mild to cool winters. According to the Köppen Climate Classification system, Stephensport has a humid subtropical climate, abbreviated "Cfa" on climate maps.

== Geography ==
Stephensport is located on the Ohio River along Kentucky Route 144, 9.8 miles (15.8 km) north-northwest of Hardinsburg.

== History ==
Richard Stephens served as a private in the Continental Army for 3 years during the American Revolution. For his service to George Washington, Richard Stephens, in February 1784, then 29 years old, accepted a 100,000 land grant on the Ohio River in Kentucky. Over time, Richard Stephens added more land to his estate. By 1799, with over 100,000 acres (about 150 square miles), including a large plantation 8 miles south of Hawesville and the land Stephensport was sitting on, and at least a dozen slaves, Richard Stephens was the wealthiest landowner in Breckinridge County.

Stephensport, which was plotted in 1803, was named in his honor. It was incorporated in 1825.

In 1830, Richard Stephens' son, Daniel J. Stephens, had a Methodist church built. In the 1850s a Baptist congregation was formed.

During the nineteenth century the town was relatively prosperous. It had several general stores, a drug store, warehouses, a school, flour mills, a bank, hotels, and saloons. In 1887, the town had oil street lamps installed. The economic activity was brought in by riverboats and then by the completion of the Louisville, Henderson & St. Louis railroad in 1888. In 1896 the town purchased a city hall.

A fire swept through the northeast corner of town in 1912 destroying several stores and the bank. The town Board of Trustees no longer met after 1915. Another fire in 1927 burned down two warehouses and two stores. Most non-agricultural economic activity that was left was destroyed by the Ohio River flood of 1937.

In 1950, a new bridge was placed over Sinking Creek and in 1952 Main Street was paved.

== Post office ==
Stephensport has a post office with ZIP code 40170, which opened on December 12, 1825.
