= The Young Moose Hunters =

1882 short story

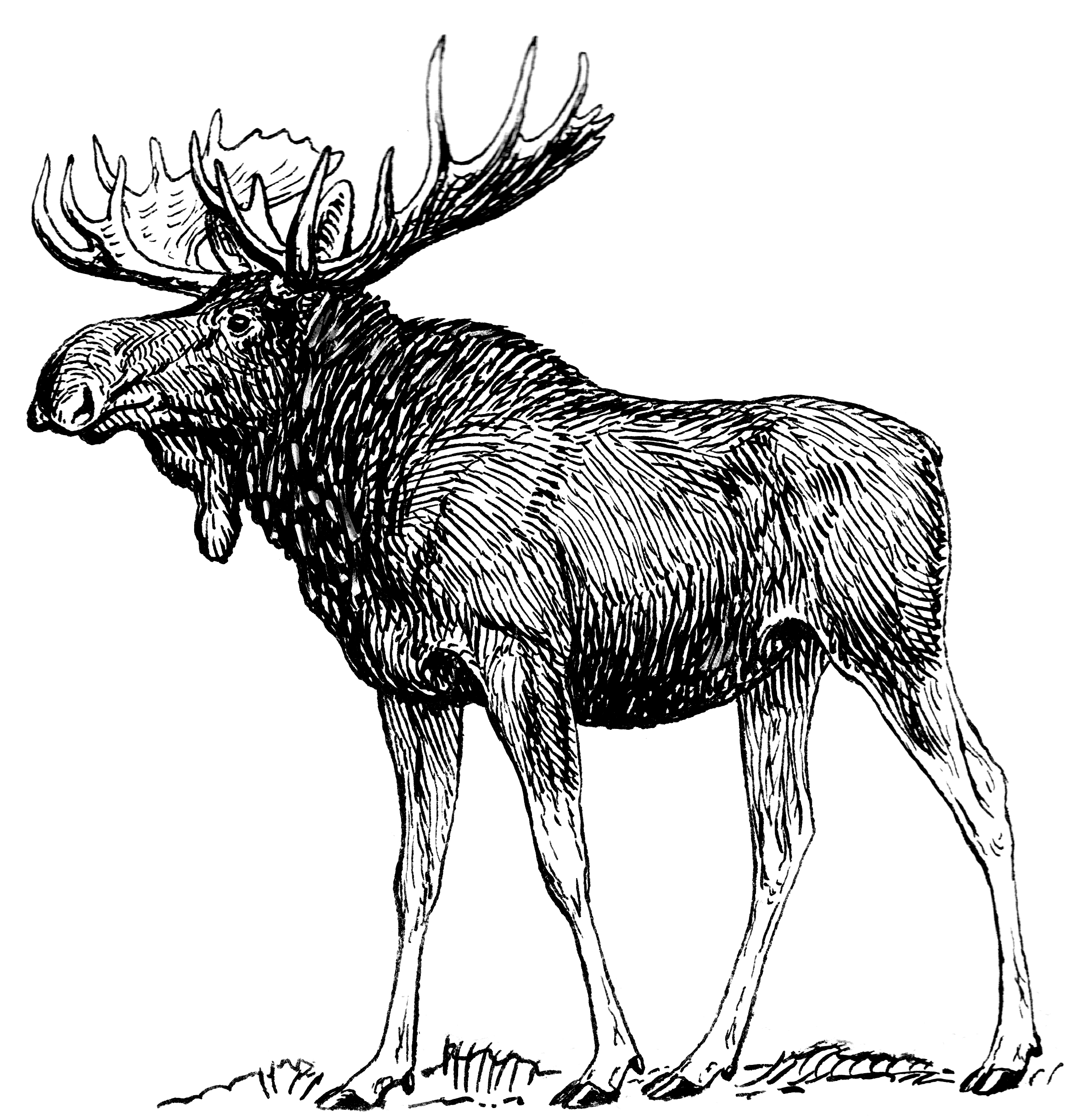

"The Young Moose Hunters" is an 1882 story by American writer C. A. Stephens. The story recounts the author's recollections of his adventures with fellow Paris Hill Academy students Henry Scott Whitman and Fred Bartlett during the American Civil War. The students travel over the St. Lawrence and Atlantic Railroad and then walk to Lake Umbagog where Bartlett's friend, Charles Henry Farr, has a boat they row to Parmachenee Lake. There the four teenagers camp in the woods catching trout, trapping furs and gathering spruce gum to sell earning money for tuition, board and room while attending school.
