= James Lynch fitz Stephen =

Mayor of Galway

James Lynch fitz Stephen was mayor of Galway for the civic year 1493–1494. He is believed to have been the father of Stephen Lynch fitz James, mayor 1509–10, 1516–17 and 1523. James Lynch funded a window in St. Nicholas' Collegiate Church.

== Hanging legend ==
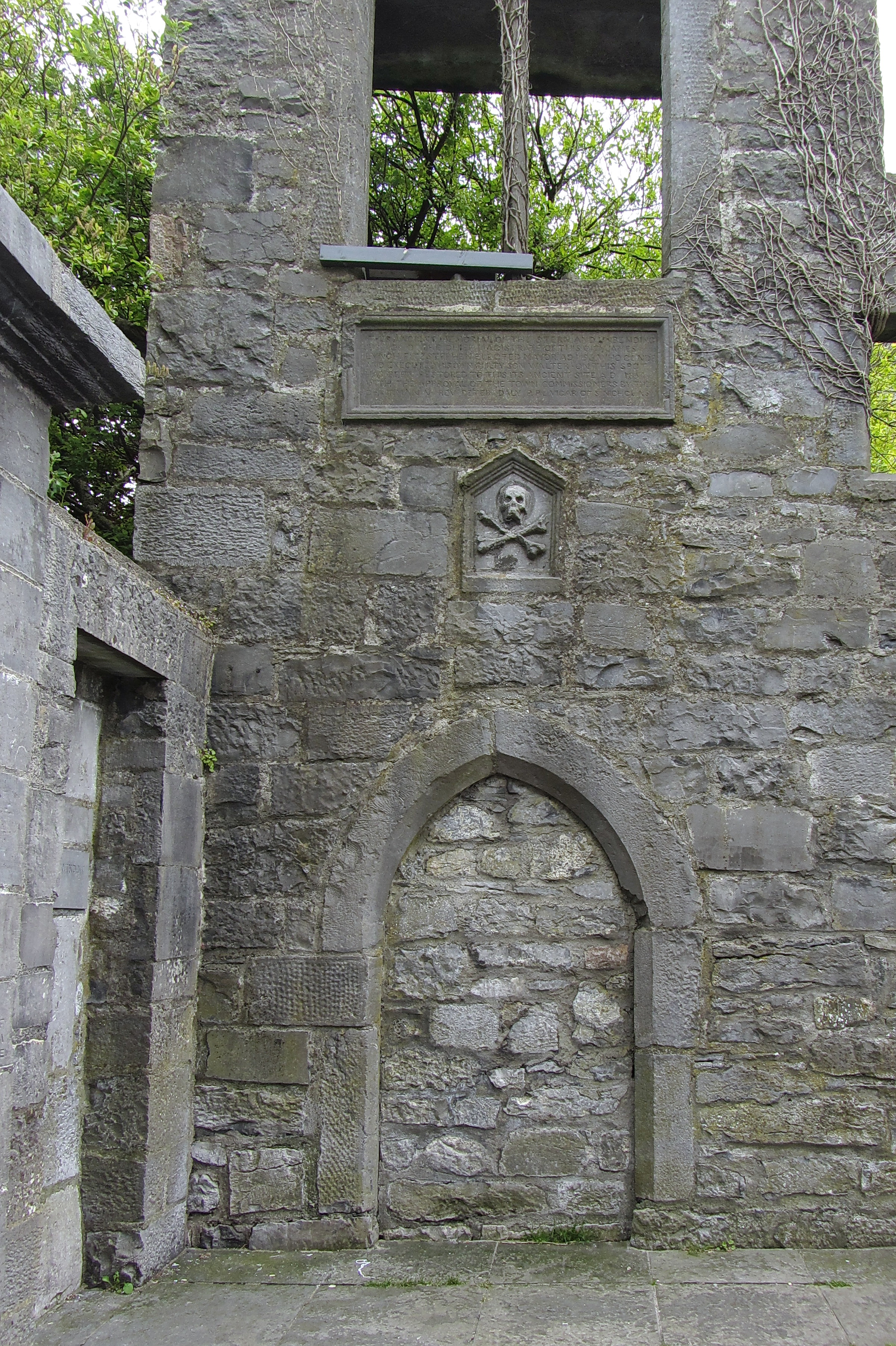
Lynch Memorial Window, Galway

A legend states that James Lynch, during his term as mayor, sentenced his son to death for "broken trust" and murder of "a stranger", and personally hanged him from a window of his own house. The earliest extant account was written by a Spanish Dominican in 1674. James Mitchell argues that the story is a pure myth, since numerous earlier accounts of the period make no mention of it. Later accounts state that the "stranger" was a Spaniard. By the eighteenth century, the site of the hanging was identified as a house in Lombard Street whose facade included stones inscribed with the date 1624, a skull and crossbones, and the motto "REMEMBER DEATHE / VANITI OF VANITI & ALL IS BUT VANITI". In Edward Mangin's 1807 novel, George III, a sea-captain tells an embellished version of the story in which the son kills a Spanish friend whom he wrongly suspects of wooing his fiancée. James Hardiman's 1820 History of Galway presents Mangin's account as legend rather than fiction, though Hardiman's later writings give it less credence. Edward Groves' 1831 play The Warden of Galway is based on the legend, with the protagonist "Walter Lynch" as Warden of Galway rather than Mayor.

In 1844, the house in Lombard Street was demolished, and the inscribed stones were retained by a committee. They were displayed at the Great Industrial Exhibition in Dublin in 1853. In 1854 Galway town commissioners allowed the committee to set them in a specially constructed imitation house-front set in the Market Street boundary wall of St. Nicholas' churchyard, near the site of the demolished house. A new inscription states: "This Ancient Memorial Of The Stern And Unbending Justice Of The Chief Magistrate Of This City James Lynch Fitzstephen Elected Mayor A.D. 1493 Who Condemned And Executed His Own Guilty Son Walter On This Spot Has Been Restored To This Its Ancient Site A.D. 1854". Concrete supports were added in 1978.

In the twentieth century, the story of mayor Lynch was presented as a false etymology of the verb "to lynch".

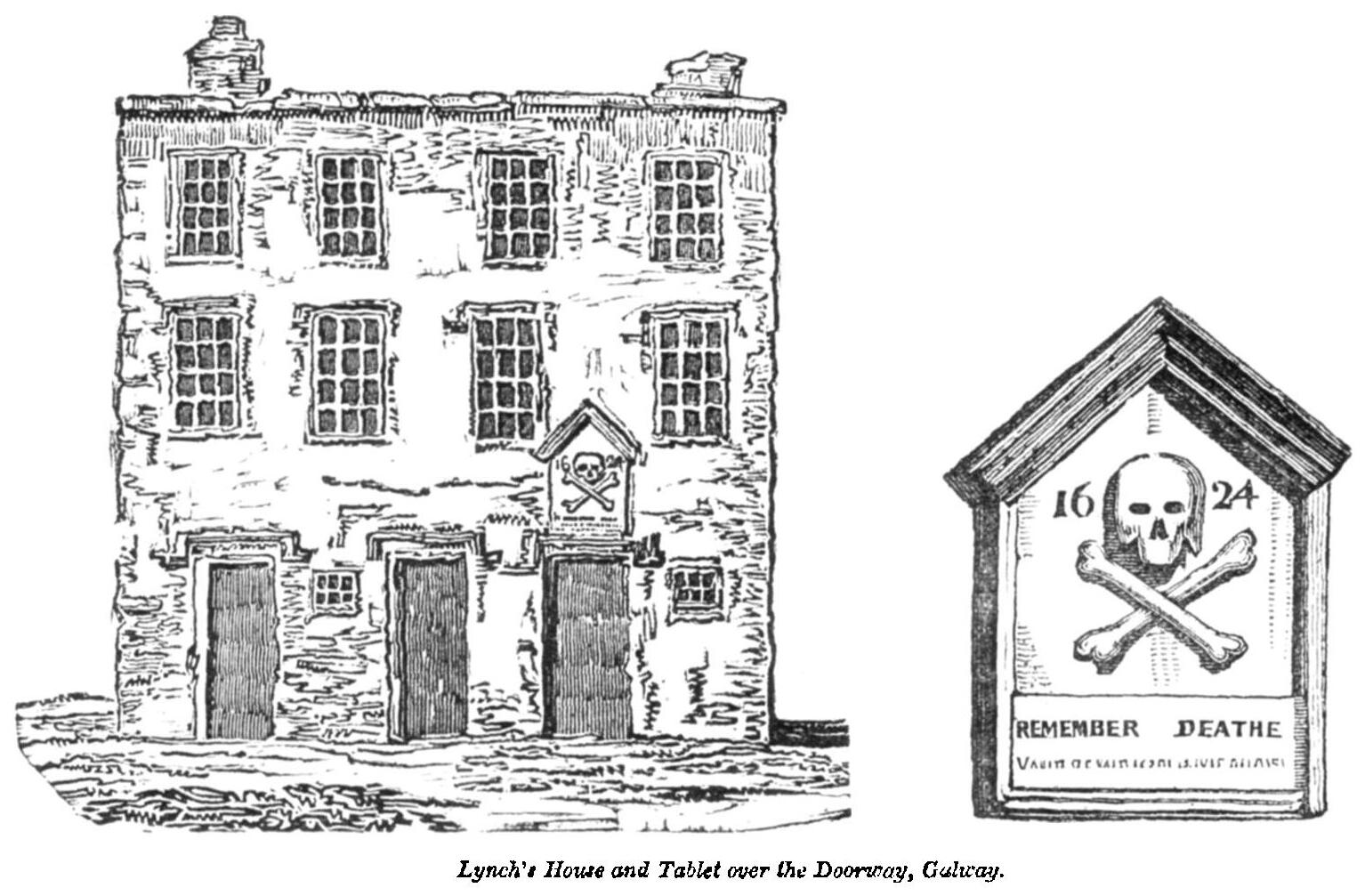
Warden Lynch's House
