= Samuel Stevens =

Samuel Stevens may refer to:

- Samuel Stevens (naturalist) (1817–1899), British naturalist
- Samuel Amour Stevens (South African) (Born 2001) Professional basketball player
- Samuel Stevens Jr
- Samuel Stevens (New York) (1794–1854), American attorney, legislator, and militia officer
- Sammy Stevens (1890–?), English footballer
- Sam Stevens (footballer) (born 1935), Scottish footballer
- Sam Stevens (golfer) (born 1996), American professional golfer

== See also ==
- Samuel Stephens (disambiguation)
