= Ben Stevenson =

Ben Stevenson may refer to:

- Ben Stevenson (dancer) (1936–2026), English ballet dancer and artistic director
- Ben Stevenson (footballer) (born 1997), English footballer, for Forest Green Rovers
- Ben Stevenson (American football) (1906–1969), American football player
- Ben Stevenson (rugby union) (born 1998), English Rugby Union player
- Ben Stevenson (water polo) (born 1995), American water polo player

== See also ==
- Benjamin Stephenson (disambiguation)
