= Judge Stephenson =

Judge Stephenson may refer to:

- John Stephenson (judge) (1910–1998), English barrister and judge, Lord Justice of Appeal
- Roy Laverne Stephenson (1917–1982), judge of the United States Court of Appeals for the Eighth Circuit
- William B. Stephenson (1802–1884), judge of the Harford County Levy Court

== See also ==
- Justice Stephenson (disambiguation)
