= Charles Stephens =

Charles Stephens may refer to:

- Charlie Stephens (born 1981), Canadian ice hockey forward
- C. A. Stephens (1844–1931), American writer of short stories and articles
- C. W. Stephens (c.1846–1917), British architect, best known for Harrods
- Charles Stephens (daredevil) (1862–1920), first person to die attempting to go over Niagara Falls
- Charles Edward Stephens (1821–1892), English musician and composer

== See also ==
- Charlie J. Stephens, American novelist and short story writer
- Charles Stevens (disambiguation)
