= John Óge Lynch =

Mayor of Galway from 1551 to 1552

John Óge Lynch was Mayor of Galway from 1551-52.

Lynch was mayor at a time of unrest in Connacht and Munster provoked by the Irish spy George Paris, and a French agent, M. de Botte. Despite fears to the contrary, no invasion or uprising occurred in Galway.

Civic offices
Preceded by Richard Kirwan (Mayor)	Mayor of Galway; 1551–1552	Succeeded by John Óge Lynch fitz Stephen
