= Robert Stevenson =

Robert, Rob, or Bob Stevenson may refer to:

- Robert Stevenson (civil engineer) (1772–1850), Scottish lighthouse engineer
- Robert Louis Stevenson (1850–1894), Scottish writer ("Treasure Island"), grandson of lighthouse engineer Robert Stevenson
- Robert Alan Mowbray Stevenson (1847–1900), Scottish art critic
- Robert Macaulay Stevenson (1854–1952), Scottish painter
- Bob Stevenson (trade unionist) (1926–2003), Scottish trade union leader
- Robert Horne Stevenson (1812–1886), Scottish minister
- Robert A. Stevenson (1918–2000), American ambassador to Malawi

== Entertainment ==
- Rob Stevenson (born 1970), music executive
- Robert Stevenson (musicologist) (1916–2012), American musicologist
- Robert J. Stevenson (1915–1975), American actor, politician, and husband of politician Peggy Stevenson (1924–2014)
- Robert Stevenson (filmmaker) (1905–1986), English film writer and director ("Mary Poppins", etc.)
- Robert Lindsay (actor) (Robert Stevenson, born 1949), English actor

== Sports ==
- Robert Stevenson (rugby union, born 1866) (1866–1960), Irish international rugby union player
- Robert Stevenson (rugby union, born 1886) (Robert C. Stevenson, 1886–c. 1973), Scottish international rugby union player
- Robert Stevenson (Australian footballer) (born 1976), former Australian rules footballer
- Robert Stevenson (equestrian) (born 1968), Canadian Olympic equestrian
- Robert Stevenson (footballer, born 1869) (1869–?), Scottish footballer (Thames Ironworks)
- Robert Stevenson (footballer, born 1898) (1898–?), Scottish footballer (Grimsby Town)
- Robert Stevenson (inside left) (fl. 1910s), Scottish footballer (Morton, St Mirren)
- Robert G. Stevenson (1877–1949), American football coach
- Robert L. Stevenson (coach) (1890–1952), American sports coach

== See also ==
- Robert Stephenson (disambiguation)
- Robert Stevens (disambiguation)
- Robert Stephen (disambiguation)
