= Senator Stephens (disambiguation) =

Hubert D. Stephens (1875–1946), was a U.S. Senator from Mississippi from 1923 until 1935. Senator Stephens may also refer to:

- Alexander H. Stephens (1812–1883), Georgia State Senate
- Allie Edward Stakes Stephens (1900–1973), Virginia State Senate
- Blake Stephens (fl. 2020s), Oklahoma State Senate
- Harry Stephens (Kansas politician), Kansas State Senate
- John H. Stephens (1847–1924), Texas State Senate
- John W. Stephens (1834–1870), North Carolina State Senate
- Richard Stephens (pioneer) (1755–1831), Kentucky State Senate
- Robert G. Stephens Jr. (1913–2003), Georgia State Senate
- Stan Stephens (1929–2021), Montana State Senate
- Vernon Stephens (politician) (born 1957), South Carolina State Senate

== See also ==
- Senator Stevens (disambiguation)
