= Steffensen =

Steffensen may refer to:

- Hans Christian Steffensen (1837–1912), Danish politician, jurist and speaker of the Landsting
- Jens Steffensen (born 1950), Danish footballer
- Jens Olai Steffensen (1891–1961), Norwegian politician for the Labour Party
- Johan Frederik Steffensen (1873–1961), Danish mathematician, statistician, and actuary
- John Steffensen (born 1982), Australian athlete, who specialises in 200 and 400 metres
- John Toralf Steffensen (1919–1996), Norwegian politician for the Labour Party
- Lennart Steffensen (born 1977), Norwegian football midfielder
- Peter Steffensen (born 1979), Danish badminton player
- Steffen Olai Steffensen (1842 – ??), Norwegian politician for the Conservative Party
- Wilhelm Steffensen (1889–1954), Norwegian gymnast who competed in the 1920 Summer Olympics

== See also ==
- Steffen
