= Senator Stevens (disambiguation) =

Ted Stevens (1923–2010) was a U.S. Senator from Alaska from 1968 to 2009.

Senator Stevens may also refer to:

- Ben Stevens (1959–2022), Alaska State Senate
- Dan Stevens (Minnesota politician) (born 1950), Minnesota State Senate
- Edward Stevens (general) (1745–1820), Virginia State Senate
- Elmer A. Stevens (1862–1932), Massachusetts State Senate
- Ephraim E. Stevens (1851–1907), Wisconsin State Senate
- Frederick C. Stevens (New York politician) (1856–1916), New York State Senate
- Gary Stevens (politician) (born 1941), Alaska State Senate
- Henry Stevens (Wisconsin politician) (1818–1875), Wisconsin State Senate
- Hiram F. Stevens (1852–1904), Minnesota State Senate
- James Stevens (New York politician) (1836–1912), New York State Senate
- John H. Stevens (1820–1900), Minnesota State Senate
- John L. Stevens (1820–1895), Maine State Senate
- John Stevens (Tennessee politician) (born 1973), Tennessee State Senate
- Moses T. Stevens (1825–1907), Massachusetts State Senate
- Orlando Stevens (1797–1879), Vermont State Senate
- Richard Y. Stevens (born 1948), North Carolina State Senate
- Robert S. Stevens (judge) (1916–2000), California State Senate
- Robert S. Stevens (politician) (1824–1893), Kansas State Senate
- Val Stevens (fl. 1990s–2010s), Washington State Senate
- Willard T. Stevens (1865–1937), Wisconsin State Senate
- William A. Stevens (1879–1941), New Jersey State Senate
- William N. Stevens (1850–1889), Virginia State Senate

== See also ==
- Senator Stephens (disambiguation)
