= Judge Stevens =

Judge Stevens may refer to:

- John Paul Stevens (1920–2019), judge of the United States Court of Appeal for the Seventh Circuit before becoming an associate justice of the Supreme Court of the United States
- Joseph Edward Stevens Jr. (1928–1998), judge of the United States District Courts for the Eastern and Western Districts of Missouri
- Harold A. Stevens (1907–1990), judge of the New York Court of General Sessions
- Robert S. Stevens (judge) (1916–2000), judge of the Los Angeles County Superior Court

== See also ==
- Justice Stevens (disambiguation)
- Judge Stephens (disambiguation)
