= Magdalene Blair =

Magdalene Blair was accused as a witch in Stirling in the 17th century.

== History ==
In March 1659, Magdalene Blair was tried on witchcraft-related charges alongside two other Stirling women, Isobel Bennet and Bessie Stivenson, for allegedly using charms to cure illness. Depositions in the case against Magdalene Blair provided names of the witnesses in the trials. Of the three women, Magdelene Blair was the only one to be acquitted and released.
