= James Stephen =

James Stephen may refer to:

- James Stephen (architect) (1858–1938), American architect
- James Stephen (British politician) (1758–1832), British abolitionist lawyer and Member of Parliament
- Sir James Stephen (civil servant) (1789–1859), British under-secretary for the colonies, 1836–1847, son of the British politician
- Sir James Fitzjames Stephen (1829–1894), British judge and anti-libertarian writer, son of the civil servant
- James Stephen (Australian politician) (1822–1881), member of the Victorian Legislative Assembly, Attorney-General of Victoria and Supreme Court judge
- James Kenneth Stephen (1859–1892), English poet, son of James Fitzjames Stephen
- James Lynch fitz Stephen, mayor of Galway, 1493–1494
- Jimmy Stephen (1922–2012), footballer

== See also ==
- James Stephens (disambiguation)
