= Pacific Ocean Division =

One of the eight permanent divisions of the U.S. Army Corps of Engineers

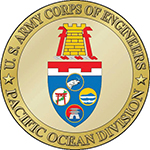
Division emblem

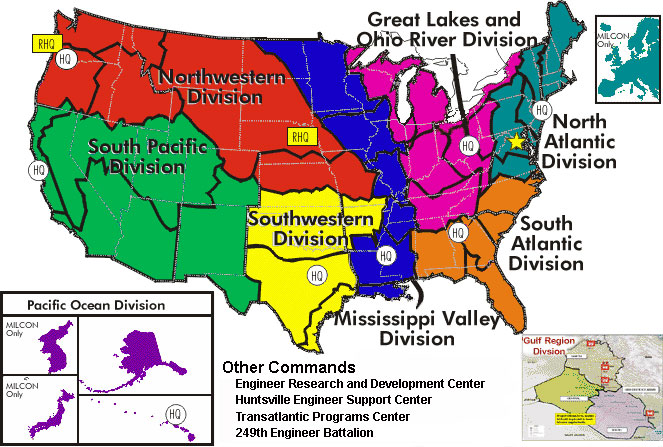
USACE Pacific Ocean Division, in purple

The United States Army Corps of Engineers Pacific Ocean Division (POD) is an Army organization providing Military and Host Nation Construction services, and civil works in the American states and territories in the Pacific: Alaska, Hawaii, Guam, American Samoa and the Commonwealth of the Northern Mariana Islands. Projects include navigation, flood damage reduction, shore protection, and environmental restoration.

The division is headquartered in Honolulu, Hawaii. The Division Commander is directly responsible to the USACE Chief of Engineers.

The Pacific Ocean Division has four districts:

- the Alaska district, at Elmendorf Air Force Base in Anchorage, Alaska
- the Honolulu District, at Fort Shafter in Honolulu, Hawaii
- the Far East district, based in Seoul, Korea, which administers "a multi-billion dollar construction program for U.S. Forces in the Republic of Korea"
- the Japan District, in Camp Zama in the Kanagawa Prefecture of Japan
