= Bob Stevens (band) =

Bob Stevens is a Swedish dansband established in 1958 in Scania, Sweden continuing until the late 1970s. The band was revived under new management in 1987 with new members. In the 1990s, the band released a number of albums that charted on the Svensktoppen chart. Famous singles from the period include "Ett litet under" and cover for "No more Bolero", with Mats Kärrlid on main vocals. After a brief stop in the mid-2000s, is "Bobbarna 're in the process of writing music, touring and recording discs. In 2010s, they returned with albums För bra för att va'sann (2012), Mitt skåne (2014) and Skåne är ett härligt land (2015) that all charted on Sverigetopplistan, the official Swedish Albums chart.

Most recent members of the band are: Mats Kärrlid (main vocals and guitar), Dan Gustafsson (guitar, saxophone and backing vocals), Mats Olsson (saxophone and keyboards) and Micke Langen (drums).

== Discography ==
=== Albums ===
- 1994: Bob Stevens
- 1996: 2
- 1998: Samma leende som du
- 2001: Ljusblåa ögon
- 2005: Barndomsåren
- 2008: Här igen!
- 2010: Bolero

Year	Album	Peak positions
Year	Album	SWE
2012	För bra för att va' sann	12
2014	Mitt Skåne	29
2014	Skåne är ett härligt land	41

=== EPs ===
- 1989: Räck ut din hand / Nidälven
- 1990: Månskenskyssen / Gitarr-medley
