= Emission-line star =

An emission-line star is a star whose spectrum exhibits emission lines in the optical spectra. Common types include:

- Be star
- Herbig Ae/Be star
- Shell star
- Wolf–Rayet star
