= Steens =

Steens may refer to:

- Steens, Mississippi, an unincorporated community
- Steens Mountain, a fault-block mountain in southeast Oregon state

== See also ==
- Ron Steens (b. 1952), Dutch field hockey player
- Steens Highway, Oregon Route 78
