= Ryan Stevenson =

Ryan Stevenson may refer to:

- Ryan Stevenson (cricketer) (born 1992), English cricketer
- Ryan Stevenson (drummer) (born 1987), Canadian drummer and singer
- Ryan Stevenson (footballer) (born 1984), Scottish footballer
- Ryan Stevenson (singer) (born 1979), American Christian musician, singer, guitarist

== See also ==
- Ryan Stephenson (disambiguation)
