= Charles Edward Stevens =

American scientist (1927–2008)

Dr. Charles Edward "Ed" Stevens (1927–2008) was an American scientist, professor, and veterinarian. An internationally recognized expert in the field of comparative physiology and digestive systems, Dr. Stevens was responsible for over 70 publications including text books used in Veterinary Schools worldwide, including Comparative Physiology of the Vertebrate Digestive System.

== Education and accolades ==
Dr. Stevens graduated from the University of Minnesota with a Bachelor and Master of Science, Doctor of Veterinary Medicine and Doctor of Philosophy degree. He was a professor, research scientist and Chairman of Physiology, Biology and Pharmacology at Cornell University for 18 years. In 1980, he joined North Carolina State University and helped establish the NC State Veterinary School, becoming Associate Dean and Director of Research and Graduate Studies. He also served as Associate Vice Chancellor before retiring in 1992. Dr. Stevens was President of the American Association of Veterinary Physiologists and Pharmacology; a Fulbright Scholar; honorary Professor of San Marcos University in Lima, Peru; the second Honorary Lifetime Member of the Comparative Nutrition Society, and the recipient of the Distinguished Alumni Award from the College of Veterinary Medicine, University of Minnesota.
