= James Stephens =

James Stephens may refer to:

- James Stephens (MP) (died 1683), MP for Gloucester
- James Francis Stephens (1792–1852), English entomologist and naturalist
- James B. Stephens (1806–1889), founder of East Portland, Oregon
- James Stephens (trade unionist) (1821–1889), Welsh-born Australian stonemason and trade unionist
- James Stephens (Fenian) (1825–1901), Irish revolutionary
- James Brunton Stephens (1832–1902), Scottish-born Australian poet and teacher
- James Stephens (Australian politician) (1881–1962), South Australian politician
- James Stephens (author) (1882–1950), Irish novelist and poet
- James T. Stephens (born 1939), American heir, businessman and philanthropist
- James Stephens (actor) (born 1951), American actor

== Other ==
- James Stephens GAA, a Kilkenny-based Gaelic Athletic Association club
- SS James B. Stephens, a 1942 liberty ship named for the founder of East Portland

== See also ==
- James Stevens (disambiguation)
- James Stephen (disambiguation)
