= Elizabeth Stevenson =

Elizabeth Stevenson may refer to:

- Elizabeth Cottrell (born 1975), legally Stevenson, American geologist
- Elizabeth Gaskell (1810–1865), née Stevenson, English novelist, biographer, and short story writer
- Elizabeth Stevenson (academic) (1919–1999), American author
