= Bessie Stivenson =

- Born: c.1610?
- Died: 1659; Stirling, Scotland
- Cause of death: Capital punishment (strangled and burnt)

Bessie Stivenson or Bessie Stevenson (c.1610? to 1659) was executed for witchcraft in Stirling, Scotland in the 17th century.

== Biography ==
Bessie Stivenson was tried on witchcraft-related charges in March 1659, alongside two other Stirling women, Magdalene Blair and Isobel Bennet, for using charms to cure illness. She was a widow and thought to be around 49 years old at the time of the trial.

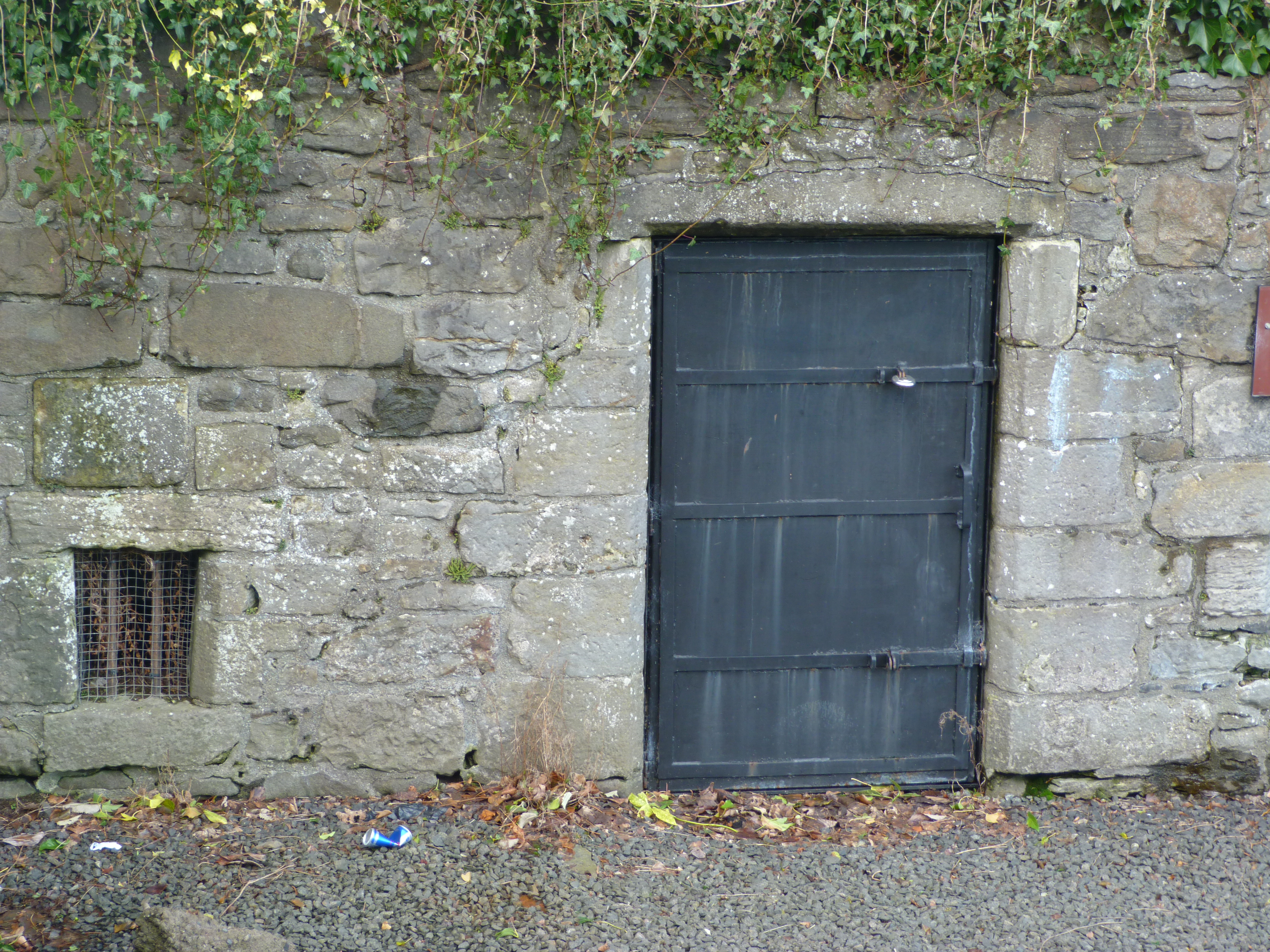
The door to the well at Wellgreen, Stirling.

Stivenson confessed to healing with deeds at a local well (Wellgreen), but denied using words. She was found guilty and sentenced to death. She was strangled and burnt.
