= Stenson =

Stenson is a surname. See "Stinson" for its origin. Notable people with the surname include:

- Bobo Stenson (born 1944), Swedish pianist
- Carley Stenson (born 1982), English actress and singer
- Dernell Stenson (1978–2003), US baseball player
- Enda Stenson, Gaelic football referee
- Fran Stenson (born 2001), English footballer
- Fred Stenson (politician) (1914–1990), former Canadian MP for Peterborough
- Fred Stenson (writer) (born 1951), writer of historical fiction from Alberta
- Ged Stenson (born 1959), English footballer
- Henrik Stenson (born 1976), Swedish golfer
- John Stenson (born 1949), English footballer
- Michael Thomas Stenson (1838–1912), Canadian politician
- Tyler Stenson (born 1981), singer/songwriter from Oregon
- William Stenson (1770–1861), mining engineer

== See also ==
- Stenson, Derbyshire, hamlet south of Derby on the Trent and Mersey Canal in the UK
