= Justice Stephenson =

Justice Stephenson may refer to:

- Donnan Stephenson (1919–2000), associate justice of the New Mexico Supreme Court
- James B. Stephenson (1916–2005), associate justice of the Kentucky Supreme Court
- Marshall L. Stephenson (c. 1838–1911), associate justice of the Arkansas Supreme Court
- Roscoe B. Stephenson Jr. (1922–2011), associate justice of the Supreme Court of Virginia
- Will P. Stephenson (1868–1943), associate justice of the Supreme Court of Ohio

== See also ==
- Birnie Stephenson-Brooks (fl. 1980s–2020s), justice of the Eastern Caribbean Supreme Court
- William Stevenson (judge) (1934–2021), justice of the Canadian Supreme Court
- Judge Stephenson (disambiguation)
