= Stephensen =

Stephensen is a surname. Notable people with the surname include:

- Dana Stephensen (born 1984/85), Australian ballet dancer
- Felix Stephensen (born 1990), Norwegian poker player
- Marta María Stephensen (1770–1805), Icelandic writer
- P. R. Stephensen (1901–1965), Australian writer, publisher, and political activist
- Stephan Stephensen
