= Samuel Stephens =

Samuel Stephens may refer to:

- Samuel Stephens (senior) (1728–1794), Member of Parliament for St Ives 1751–1754
- Samuel Stephens (junior) (c.1768–1834), Member of Parliament for St Ives 1806–1812 and 1818–1820, son of the above
- Samuel Stephens (colonial manager) (1808–1840), first colonial manager (CEO) of the South Australian Company (1836–1837)
- Samuel Stephens (New Zealand politician) (1803–1855), member of the New Zealand House of Representatives
- Samuel Stephens (North Carolina governor) (1629–1669), colonial governor of North Carolina
- Samuel Barron Stephens, (1814–1882), member of the Florida House of Representatives

== See also ==
- Samuel Stevens (disambiguation)
