= Charles Stevens (serial killer) =

American serial killer on death row

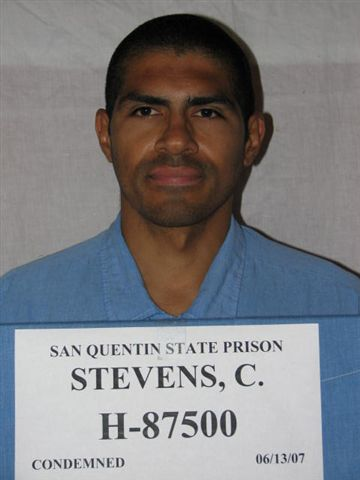
- Born: Charles Arnett Stevens; March 19, 1969 (age 57); Oakland, California, U.S.
- Other name: "The I-580 killer"
- Convictions: First degree murder with special circumstances First degree murder (3 counts); Attempted murder (6 counts)
- Penalty: Death

Details
- Victims: 4 (one as an accomplice)
- Span of crimes: April 3 – July 27, 1989
- Country: United States
- State: California
- Date apprehended: July 27, 1989
- Imprisoned at: San Quentin State Prison, San Quentin, California

Charles Arnett Stevens (born March 19, 1969), known as The I-580 Killer, is an American serial killer who shot eight people along Interstate 580 in 1989, killing four of them. He was sentenced to death and currently resides in San Quentin State Prison.

== Early life ==
Stevens was born on March 19, 1969, in Oakland, California, the younger of two siblings. Throughout his childhood, his mother was repeatedly arrested for crimes involving alcohol, such as drunk driving and child abuse. The alcohol abuse eventually led to her death. At age 12, Stevens tied a noose in his room and attempted suicide. He attended high school at Oakland Technical High School, where he was known to be shy and timid, but many of his peers found him attractive, which led to a girl named Mia Chatman forming a relationship with him. They dated for about seven months before she broke up with him. In his senior year, he met Richard James Clark, younger than him. The two hit it off and quickly dived into a friendship.

== Murders ==
On April 3, 1989, Stevens and Clark approached a parked vehicle containing 29-year-old Leslie Noyer. Stevens opened the passenger-side unlocked door, leaving a mark of his palm print, and Clark shot Noyer in the head. Police collected the shell-casings that Stevens had left, as well as the palm print. Three months later, Stevens, this time on his own, failed to ambush a woman named Karen Anderson while she was making a turn down a poorly lit grassy trail. He fired at least six shots, missing all of them but shattering Anderson's window. The next day, on June 8, Stevens killed 16-year-old Laquann Sloan while she was making a turn through an exit on Interstate-580.

On July 6, Stevens, again on his own, pulled over behind a vehicle occupied by 36-year-old Lori Rochon on the side of the highway near the Grand Avenue exit in Oakland. He shot at her multiple times, killing her. On July 16, with Clark in the passenger seat, Stevens was driving his car on the highway when he merged a van into the right lane and shot multiple times at it. The vehicle was occupied by Paul Fenn and Julia Peters. Peters was cut by a loose piece of glass that a bullet set off, and she received hospital treatment before making a recovery.

The police and motorists who drove on the highway frequently became weary of the string of murders, and police cars would be scouting the highway, looking for the killer. Then on July 27, Stevens narrowly avoided killing 24-year-old Rodney Stokes on the highway, missing his shots. After nearly being killed by Stevens, Rodney Stokes followed behind him with his headlights off, and he saw Stevens pull up next to a car and shoot and kill the driver. Stokes followed Stevens for a couple of minutes before stopping at a payphone, calling the police, and giving a vehicle description. While there, police found the vehicle that the killer shot at and identified the murdered driver as 28-year-old Raymond August. A few hours later, police stopped a vehicle matching the description Stokes gave out. The driver, who was Stevens, was arrested, and police confiscated his gun.

The gun, which was a .357 Magnum Desert Eagle, was tested by police to the bullets and the ballistics used to kill August, as well as the three victims on the I-580, and the three other attempted murders. They matched, and Stevens was charged with the murders. After being captured, Stevens sold out Clark, and he, too, was soon arrested.

== Conviction and appeals ==
During the trial, Clark testified against Stevens for the Noyer slaying. Clark claimed he only shot Noyer because Stevens had a gun pointed at his head and was threatening him. After just an hour of deliberating, in January 1993, Stevens was found guilty on all counts by jury verdict. Days later, he was sentenced to death and transported to San Quentin State Prison to await execution. Clark pleaded no contest to voluntary manslaughter, and he was sentenced to 13 years in prison in May 1993.

Stevens attempted to appeal his sentence in 2004 because his original defense team did not try to challenge the evidence presented at trial. For example, they never hired an expert to challenge the ballistics evidence and never pressed any questions against Clark, who was testifying against Stevens. The plea was not accepted, though. Clark was released in 2006, but Stevens remains in prison awaiting execution. Capital punishment in California remains in a state of limbo following multiple ballot initiatives and a governor-imposed moratorium, and executions have not been fulfilled in California since 2006, so what will happen to Stevens is uncertain. On February 14, 2022, The United States Court of Appeals For The Ninth Circuit affirmed the US District Court for the Northern District of California's denial of his petition for writ of habeas corpus. His petition for en banc rehearing was subsequently denied April 22, 2022. On September 9, 2022, Stevens filed a petition for writ of certiorari to the Supreme Court of the United States, which was denied on January 9, 2023. This was his final appeal after which all appeals are now exhausted.

== See also ==
- List of death row inmates in the United States
- List of serial killers in the United States
