= Stefansson =

Stefansson or Stefánsson is a surname of Icelandic or Swedish origin, meaning son of Stefán. In Icelandic names, the name is not strictly a surname, but a patronymic. The name may refer to:

- Baldur R. Stefansson (1917–2002), Canadian agricultural scientist; known as the Father of Canola
- Davíð Stefánsson (1895–1964), Icelandic poet
- Hannes Stefánsson (born 1972), Icelandic chess grandmaster
- Hermann Stefánsson (born 1968), Icelandic author
- Ívar Stefánsson (1927–2009), Icelandic cross-country skier
- Janne Stefansson (born 1935), Swedish Olympic cross-country skier
- Jón Arnór Stefánsson (born 1982), Icelandic professional basketball player
- Jón Kalman Stefánsson (born 1963), Icelandic author
- Kári Stefánsson (born 1949), Icelandic physician and professor of neurology; co-founder of deCODE Genetics
- Ólafur Stefánsson (born 1973), Icelandic professional handball player
- Sigurd Stefánsson, the author of the historical Skálholt Map
- Stefán Jóhann Stefánsson (1894–1980), Icelandic politician; prime minister of Iceland 1947–49
- Stefán Karl Stefánsson (1975–2018), Icelandic film and stage actor
- Stefán Vagn Stefánsson (born 1972), Icelandic politician
- Vilhjalmur Stefansson (1879–1962), Canadian Arctic explorer and ethnologist
