= Robert Stephen (disambiguation) =

Robert Stephen is a snooker player.

Robert Stephen may also refer to:

- Bob Stephen, Canadian football player

== See also ==
- Robert Stephens (disambiguation)
