= Mitchell Stephens =

Mitchell Stephens may refer to:

- Mitchell Stephens (academic) (born 1949), American university professor and author
- Mitchell Stephens (ice hockey) (born 1997), Canadian ice hockey player
