= Ben Stevenson (American football) =

American football player (1906–1969)

No. 48
- Position: Halfback

Personal information
- Born: March 20, 1906; Smith Mills, Missouri, U.S.
- Died: November 14, 1969 (aged 63); Houston, Texas, U.S.
- Listed height: 6 ft 2 in (1.88 m)
- Listed weight: 210 lb (95 kg)

Career information
- High school: Garrison (Liberty, Missouri); Tuskegee Normal Industrial Institute (Tuskegee, Alabama)
- College: Tuskegee (1923–1930)
- College Football Hall of Fame (Class of 2003)

Ben Stevenson (March 20, 1906 – November 14, 1969) was an American football player. He was elected to the College Football Hall of Fame in 2003. Ben Stevenson or "Big Ben" was discovered by coach Cleve Abbott, who persuaded him to join him at Tuskegee. Stevenson played eight seasons for the Golden Tigers, and during that period the team suffered only 2 losses.

Stevenson combined his great speed, endurance and strength. He played both in defense and attack, and scored with a combination of long runs and drop kicks. With him, the Tigers won six national championships.

During his career, which spanned 7 years, he managed to score 42 touchdowns on runs of 50 yards or more. Ben Stevenson was named to seven consecutive Black College All-America teams and was named the game's best all-around player.

At Tuskegee, he studied under George Washington Carver and later coached at the college and high school levels.
