= Steffen Olai Steffensen =

Norwegian politician

Steffen Olai Steffensen (1842 – 1928) was a Norwegian politician for the Conservative Party.

He was elected to the Parliament of Norway in 1897, representing the constituency of Akershus Amt. He was a farmer. He sat through one term.
