= Rob Stevens (kickboxer) =

English personal trainer, kickboxer and strength coach

Rob Stevens is an English personal trainer, strength coach, and kickboxer. Billing as Rob "Diesel" Stevens he notably won a World Champion Belt at Super Lightweight and was ISKA Lightweight World Kickboxing Champion.

Stevens, from Wythall near Birmingham, attended Oak Cottage Primary, and Woodrush School studying languages at Birmingham University. In his early career he trained at Birmingham Martial Arts Centre, Hall Green. In 2007, IKF Europe noted Stevens was considered amongst the very best amateur full contact fighters in the world. He made his professional debut on 11 February 2007 defeating Andy Mann the pro North West West Area champion for WAKO, the World Association of Kickboxing Organizations. On 1 April 2007, previously undefeated, Stevens lost to Sukhy Shoria. He fought Aaron Robinson on 3 June 2007.

On 7 December 2008, as a Featherweight, Stevens outpointed Steve Cooke over 6 rounds at The Opera House, Boscombe.

On 8 February 2009, Stevens defeated Mike Nudd winning all eight rounds for a unanimous decision to become the Kickboxing Super Lightweight English Champion in the International Kickboxing Federation (IKF). By Stevens as British, Kickboxing champion, defeated Paddy Burke to take the ISKA British welterweight pro-am title with unanimous decision over five rounds.

By May 2013 Stevens was World Kick Boxing Champion

Stevens switched to fight K-1 rules in 2018.
