= Robert Stevenson (footballer, born 1898) =

Scottish footballer

Personal information
- Date of birth: 1898
- Place of birth: Craigneuk, Scotland
- Height: 5 ft 8 1/2 in (1.74 m)
- Position: Full-back

Senior career*
Years	Team	Apps	(Gls)
1920–1921	Motherwell YMCA		
1921–1923	Grimsby Town	8	(0)
- * Club domestic league appearances and goals

Robert Stevenson (1898 – after 1922) was a Scottish professional footballer who played as a full-back.
