= Justice Stephens =

Justice Stephens may refer to:

- Debra L. Stephens (born 1965), associate justice of the Washington Supreme Court
- Kenneth C. Stephan (born 1946), associate justice of the Nebraska Supreme Court
- Linton Stephens (1823–1872), associate justice of the Supreme Court of Georgia
- Robert F. Stephens (1927–2002), associate justice and chief justice of the Kentucky Supreme Court
- William Stephens (judge) (1752–1819), chief justice of the Supreme Court of Georgia

== See also ==
- John Stephen (Maryland judge) (1780–1844), associate justice of the Maryland Court of Appeals
- Judge Stephens (disambiguation)
- Justice Stevens (disambiguation)
