= Hardiman's History of Galway =

1820 history by James Hardiman

The History of the Town and County of the Town of Galway. From the Earliest Period to the Present Time
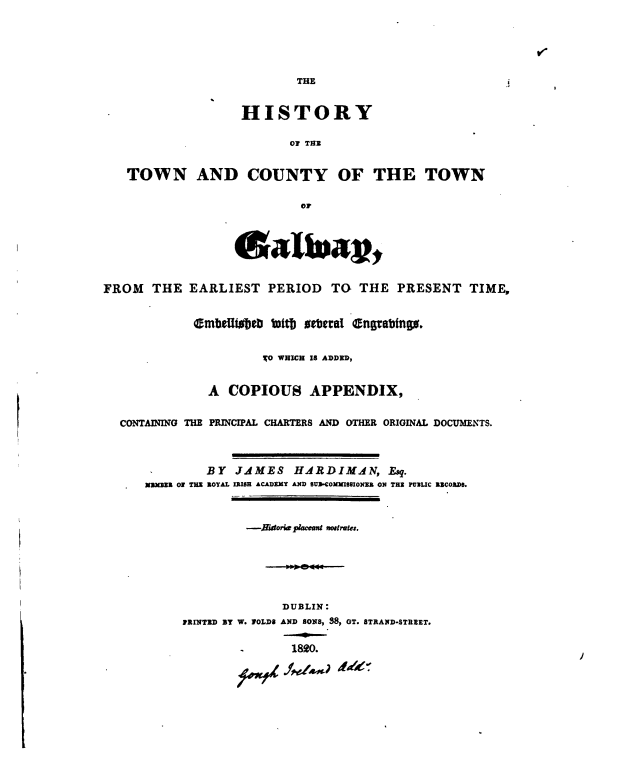
- Title page of the original 1820 publishing
- Author: James Hardiman
- Language: English
- Subject: Irish History
- Genre: Non-fiction
- Publisher: W. Folds and Sons
- Publication date: 1820
- Publication place: Ireland
- Pages: 336

James Hardiman's History of Galway (full title: The History of the Town and County of the Town of Galway. From the Earliest Period to the Present Time) is considered to be the definitive history of Galway city and county from the earliest of times until the early 19th century.

The book was originally published in Dublin by W. Folds & Sons (1820) and twice reprinted in Galway by the Connacht Tribune Printing and Publishing Co. (1958 and 1985) and by Kenny's of Galway (1975). It is now out of copyright and is available on the web.
