= Stiven =

Stiven is a masculine given name. Notable people with the name include:

- Stiven Bibo, Albanian footballer
- Steve Burtt Jr. (Stiven Burtt), American-born Ukrainian basketball player
- Stiven De Johnston, the founder of the Johnsons of Hilton
- Stiven Jimenez, American soccer player
- Stiven Mendoza, Colombian footballer
- Stiven Plaza, Ecuadorean footballer
- Stiven Rivić, Croatian footballer
- Stiven Rodríguez, Colombian footballer
- Stiven Shpendi, Albanian footballer
- Stiven Tobar Valencia, Colombian-born Icelandic handball player
- Stiven Vega, Colombian footballer

== See also ==
- Erson Stiven Dias Costa (Kukula), Cape Verdean footballer
- Steven
