= Charles Stevenson =

Charles Stevenson may refer to:

- Charles Stevenson (philosopher) (1908–1979), American philosopher
- Charles Alexander Stevenson (1855–1950), Scottish lighthouse engineer
- Charles C. Stevenson (1826–1890), governor of Nevada, US
- Charles Stevenson (actor) (1887–1943), American actor
- Chuck Stevenson (1919–1995), American racecar driver
- Charles Marchant Stevenson (1927–2004), American artist
- Charles C. Stevenson Jr. (1930/1931–2026), American film and television actor

== See also ==
- Charles Stephenson (disambiguation)
