= Benjamin Stephenson =

Benjamin or Ben Stephenson may refer to:

- Benjamin C. Stephenson (1766–1839), English courtier
- Benjamin Franklin Stephenson (1823–1871), founder of the Grand Army of the Republic
- Benjamin Stephenson (politician) (1769–1822), American politician
- Benjamin Robert Stephenson (1835–1890), Canadian lawyer and politician
- B. C. Stephenson (1839–1906), English composer
- Ben Stephenson, Anglo-American television executive

== See also ==
- Ben Stevenson (disambiguation)
- Stephenson Grand Army of the Republic Memorial, also known as Dr. Benjamin F. Stephenson, a 1907 public artwork in Washington, D.C.
