= J. T. Stinson =

Professor John T. Stinson (1866–1958) was a notable 20th-century fruit specialist and the first director of the Missouri State Fruit Experiment Station in 1900 He is best remembered for his remark "An apple a day keeps the doctor away," given during a 1904 address to the St. Louis World's Fair. This phrase was an adaptation of a medical summary regarding the supposed health benefits of apples given to a 12th-century medical conference at the Salerno Medical School.

The now-famous "apple-a-day" slogan gained national acclaim from "Apple Day" that Mr Stinson had staged when he was the director of horticulture for the St. Louis World Fair, 1903–4.

He was the director of agricultural development of the Missouri Pacific Rail Lines from 1922 to 1946, He was an early advocate of crop rotation and diversification, and fertilizing depleted land.

A native of Montgomery County, Iowa, he joined Missouri Pacific in 1905. The next year he introduced agricultural exhibit trains. The trains stopped a day in each town along the lines and held open house and educational meetings in conjunction with county agents and university extension services. He was credited with helping thousands of farmers in the south and west.

For seven years he served as secretary of the Missouri State Fair at Sedalia.

He died in 1958 at the age of 92.
