= C. A. Stephens =

Charles Asbury Stephens (October 21, 1844 – September 22, 1931) was an American writer who published short stories and articles under the name C. A. Stephens.

Stephens was born in Norway, Maine, and wrote under the name "Stephens" to avoid embarrassing his family should he fail as a writer. He attended Bowdoin College starting in 1866, but dropped out because of lack of funds. For most of his career he was under contract to The Youth's Companion and, for a time, was their most popular and prolific contributor. Stephens himself estimated that he had written 3,000 short stories. The Youth's Companion put him through medical school so that they could have a staff physician to write scientific articles; he earned his M.D. from Boston University in 1887.

== Partial list of works ==
- Fox-hunting (1872)
- Lynx-hunting (1872)
- On the Amazons (1872)
- Left on Labrador (1873)
- Camping out: as recorded by "Kit" (1873)
- Off to the geysers (1872)
- The Best in the World (1880)
- The Young Moose Hunters (1882)
- The Knockabout Club Alongshore (1883)
- The knockabout Club in the woods (1883)
- The Knockabout club in the tropics (1883)
- The adventures of six young men in the wilds of Maine and Canada (1884)
- Living matter: its cycle of growth and decline in animal organisms (1888)
- Pluri-cellular man: Whence and what is the intellect, or "soul"? (1892)
- Charles Adams Tales (1896)
- Long life (1896)
- The nation's responsibility for its laborers on the Panama Canal (1904)
- The ark of 1803: a story of Louisiana purchase times (1904)
- Natural salvation (1905)
- Pioneer boys afloat on the Mississippi (1910)
- When Life was Young at the Old Farm in Maine (1912)
- The Fields are Adventure (1912)
- A great year of our lives at the old squire's (1912)
- Julia Sylvester (1912)
- Immortal life: how it will be achieved (1920)
- C. A. Stephens Looks at Norway (1920)
- A busy year at the old squire's (1922)
- Andros islands (1923)
- Haps and mishaps at the old farm (1925)
- Stories of my home folks (1926)
- Katahdin camps (1928)
