= Delta1 Lyrae =

Binary star system in the constellation of Lyra

Delta^{1} Lyrae
- Location of δ^{1} Lyrae (circled in red)

Observation data Epoch J2000.0 Equinox J2000.0
- Constellation: Lyra
- Right ascension: 18^{h} 53^{m} 43.55924^{s}
- Declination: +36° 58′ 18.1891″
- Apparent magnitude (V): 5.56

Characteristics
- Spectral type: B2.5V
- U−B color index: −0.67
- B−V color index: −0.15

Astrometry
Radial velocity (R_{v})	−25.8 km/s
Proper motion (μ)	RA: +1.350 mas/yr Dec.: −2.985 mas/yr
Parallax (π)	2.8072±0.1334 mas
Distance	1,160 ± 60 ly (360 ± 20 pc)
Absolute magnitude (M_{V})	−1.55

Orbit
Period (P)	88.352 days
Semi-major axis (a)	≥46.8 Gm (0.313 AU)
Eccentricity (e)	0.37±0.03
Periastron epoch (T)	2428406.613±0.500 JD
Argument of periastron (ω) (secondary)	191.3±0.1°
Semi-amplitude (K_{1}) (primary)	39.7±1.8 km/s

Details

δ^{1} Lyr A
Mass	7.9±0.1 M_{☉} 7.75±0.50 M_{☉} 6.6+0.68 −0.61 M_{☉}
Luminosity	838 L_{☉}
Luminosity (bolometric)	3,620 L_{☉}
Surface gravity (log g)	3.764±0.032 (3.848 polar) cgs
Temperature	20,350 K
Metallicity [Fe/H]	−0.05 dex
Rotational velocity (v sin i)	86±10 km/s
Age	21.1±2.2 Myr; 9+9 −4 Myr

Other designations
- Delta^{1} Lyr, 11 Lyrae, NSV 11504, BD+36°3307, GC 25934, HD 175426, HIP 92728, HR 7131, SAO 67537, WDS J18537+3658A, GSC 02650-02146

Database references
SIMBAD	data

Delta^{1} Lyrae, its name Latinized from δ^{1} Lyrae, is a binary star system in the northern constellation of Lyra. It is dimly visible to the naked eye at night with a combined apparent visual magnitude of 5.56. The system is located at a distance of approximately 1,160 light years from the Sun based on parallax, but is drifting closer with a radial velocity of −26 km/s. O. J. Eggen originally included this as a candidate member of the proposed Delta Lyrae cluster.

The variable radial velocity of this star was discovered from photographic plates taken at the Yerkes Observatory in 1904. The first set of orbital elements was computed by Frank Craig Jordan in 1916. It is a single-lined spectroscopic binary with an orbital period of 88.4 days and an eccentricity (ovalness) of 0.37.

The visible component of the pair has a blue-white hue with a stellar classification of B2.5V, indicating that it is a B-type main-sequence star undergoing core hydrogen fusion. It is a few million years old with a relatively high rotation rate and around 7–8 times the mass of the Sun. The star is radiating about 3,620 times the Sun's luminosity from its photosphere at an effective temperature of 20,350 K.

There is a magnitude 9.93 visual companion at an angular separation of 175.30 arcseconds along a position angle of 20°, as of 2012. This component was discovered by William Herschel. It is an evolved giant star with a class of K2III at a distance of around 1,760 light years.
