= James Norman Stevens =

English cricketer

James Norman Stevens (4 June 1910 – 23 December 1993) was an English cricketer active from 1937 to 1955 who played for Northamptonshire (Northants). He was born in Bexhill-on-Sea and died in Ipswich. He appeared in five first-class matches for Northants in 1937 as a right-handed batsman who bowled right arm fast medium. An amateur cricketer, he made two further first-class appearances for the Free Foresters in 1953 as well as representing Suffolk in Minor Counties Cricket from 1949 to 1955. In his first-class matches, he scored 76 runs with a highest score of 19 and took nine wickets with a best performance of three for 85.

Stevens founded the Suffolk Young Amateurs and latterly served as president of Suffolk CA. Outside of cricket, he worked as a teacher with his wartime spent with the RAF.
