= Richard Stephens (pioneer) =

American politician

Richard Stephens (September 7, 1755 – died July 2, 1831) was an American Revolutionary War soldier, politician, slave-plantation owner and Breckinridge County, Kentucky, pioneer. He is the namesake of Stephensport, Kentucky, a river town and port along the Ohio River.

== Early life and personal life ==
Stephens was born in the Colony of Virginia.

In Virginia, in September 1780, Stephens married Elizabeth Jennings, four years his junior and a native of Fairfax County, Virginia. Elizabeth and Richard produced nine children: Ann (born 1781), Eleanor (born 1783), Robert (born 1786), Richard (born 1788), Elizabeth (born 1791), Sarah (born 1794), Daniel (born 1795), Mary Ann (born 1797), and Jemima (born 1801).

== Career ==
Stephens served as a private in the Continental Army for three years during the American Revolution.

In February 1784, for payment for his service as an American Revolutionary soldier on the Virginia line, twenty-nine-year-old Stephens accepted a 100,000-acre land grant on the Ohio River in Kentucky (Nelson, Jefferson, and Breckinridge County). Over time, Stephens added more land to his estate. By 1799, with over 100,000 acres (about 150 square miles), including a large plantation eight miles south of Hawesville, and a 2,000-acre tract of land that Stephensport was sitting on, and at least a dozen slaves, Stephens was the wealthiest landowner in Breckinridge County.

Stephensport, plotted in 1803, was named in his honor.

Stephens served in the Kentucky House of Representatives in 1819, and in the Kentucky Senate from 1823 to 1827.

== Death ==
He died in Breckinridge County.

== See also ==
- List of people from Kentucky
- List of slave owners
