= Robert Stephenson (disambiguation) =

Robert Stephenson (1803–1859) was an English civil engineer and designer of locomotives.

Robert or Bob Stephenson may also refer to:

- Robert Stephenson and Company, railway locomotive building company, founded by Robert Stephenson
- Len Stephenson (Robert Leonard Stephenson, 1930–2014), English footballer
- Bob Stephenson (sportsman) (born 1942), English cricketer and footballer
- Bob Stephenson (ice hockey) (born 1954), retired Canadian ice hockey right winger
- Bob Stephenson (baseball) (1928–2020), American baseball player
- Robert Stephenson (baseball) (born 1993), American baseball player
- Bob Stephenson (actor) (born 1967), American actor, film producer and screenwriter
- Robert Donston Stephenson (1841–1916), writer and journalist
- Bob Stephenson (American football) (born 1959), American football player
- Robert Stephenson (footballer) (1875–?), British footballer
- Robert Stephenson (cricketer) (1906–1942), English cricketer and Royal Navy officer
- Robert Storer Stephenson (1858–1929), American architect

== See also ==
- Robert Stevenson (disambiguation)
- Robert Stevenson (civil engineer) (1772–1850), Scottish civil engineer
- Robert Louis Stevenson (1850–1894), Scottish author
- Robert Stephens (disambiguation)
