= James Hardiman =

Irish librarian (1782–1855)

- Born: 1782; Westport, County Mayo
- Died: 1855 (aged 72–73)
- Other name: Séamus Ó hArgadáin
- Occupation: Librarian
- Notable work: Hardiman's History of Galway

James Hardiman (February 1782 – 13 November 1855), also known as Séamus Ó hArgadáin, was a librarian at Queen's College, Galway and an important historian.

Hardiman is best remembered for his History of the Town and County of Galway (1820) and Irish Minstrelsy (1831), one of the first published collections of Irish poetry and songs.

== Biography ==
Hardiman was born in Westport, County Mayo, in the west of Ireland. His father owned a small estate in County Mayo. He was trained as a lawyer and became sub-commissioner of public records in Dublin Castle. He was an active member of the Royal Irish Academy, and collected and rescued many examples of Irish traditional music.

In 1855, shortly after its foundation, Hardiman became librarian of Queen's College, Galway.

Hardiman died on 13 November 1855 from apoplexy and was buried next to Abbey Church.

== Eponyms ==
The University of Galway (formerly Queen's College Galway) library was named in his honour.

Hardiman Road in Drumcondra, Dublin is named after him.

The Hardiman hotel in Galway is named after him.

== Works ==
- The History of the Town and County of the Town of Galway. From the Earliest Period to the Present Time (Dublin: W. Folds & Sons, 1820; reprint Galway: Connacht Tribune Printing and Publishing Co., 1958; second impression (of reprint): same publisher, 1985). Online in English
- Ancient Irish Deeds and Writing, Chiefly Relating to Landed Property, from the Twelfth to the Seventeenth Century (Dublin: Graisberry, 1828).
- Irish Minstrelsy, or Bardic Remains of Ireland, with English Poetical Translations (London: J. Robins, 1831; reprint Shannon: Irish University Press, 1971); ISBN 0-7165-0333-6.
