= Lewis Stevenson =

Lewis or Louis Stevenson may refer to:

== Sportspeople ==
- Lewis Stevenson (Australian footballer) (born 1989), Australian rules footballer
- Lewis Stevenson (Scottish footballer) (born 1988), Scottish footballer
- Lewis Stevenson (rugby union) (born 1984), Irish rugby union player
- Louis Stephenson (footballer) (born 2005), English footballer
- Louis Stevenson (1864–1931), Scotland international rugby union player

== Others ==
- Lewis Stevenson (politician) (1868–1929), American politician and member of the Stevenson political family
- B. W. Stevenson (born Louis Charles Stevenson; 1949–1988), American singer
