= Charles Bruce Stephenson =

American astronomer

- Born: 9 February 1929; Little Rock, Arkansas
- Died: 3 December 2001 (aged 72)
- Education: Ph.D.
- Alma mater: University of Chicago; University of California, Berkeley
- Spouse: Elizabeth Strong
- Parent(s): Chauncey Elvira Stephenson; Ona Richards

Charles Bruce Stephenson (February 9, 1929 – December 3, 2001) was an American astronomer. He was a professor at Case Western Reserve University.

== Biography ==
He was born on a ranch in Little Rock, Arkansas, the only son of Chauncey Elvira Stephenson and Ona Richards. During his youth he made a telescope and was a winner of the Bausch & Lomb Science Award while in High School. He attended Little Rock Junior College, then transferred to the University of Chicago. After being awarded a B.S. in mathematics in 1949, he went on to study astronomy in graduate school, attaining a M.S. in 1951.

From 1951 until 1953, he served as an astronomy research assistant at Dearborn Observatory. While a student at Northwestern, he met his future wife, Elizabeth Strong—the couple were married in 1952. In 1953 he joined the military in the U.S. Army Map Service Lunar Occultation Program, serving until 1955 whereupon he returned to the study of astronomy at the University of California, Berkeley. As a doctoral student, he was awarded the Dorothy Klumpke Roberts Prize in Astronomy by the Astronomical Society of the Pacific during 1956, and was a Lick Observatory Fellow for 1957−58. In 1958 he received his Ph.D. with a dissertation titled, "A Study of Visual Binaries Having Primaries Above the Main Sequence".

Moving to Cleveland, Ohio, he became an instructor at the Case Western Reserve University in 1958, joining the staff of the Warner & Swasey Observatory. During 1959 he was elevated to Assistant Professor, becoming Associate Professor in 1964 then Professor in 1968. During his career, he published over 120 papers. His A General Catalog of Cool Galactic Carbon Stars was published in 1973 and A General Catalog of Galactic S Stars in 1976. In 1977, he collaborated with Romanian-born astronomer Nicholas Sanduleak to publish a catalogue of Hydrogen alpha emission-line stars. (Sanduleak was a former student of Stephenson at the Case Institute of Technology.) In 1988, Dr. Stephenson was appointed the Worcester R. and Cornelia B. Warner Professor of Astronomy, then named professor emeritus upon his retirement in 1994.
