= Stevens (surname) =

Stevens as an English-language surname was brought to England after the Norman Conquest and means 'son of Steven'. This surname may refer to:

== Arts and entertainment ==
=== Literature ===
- Barry Stevens (therapist) (1902–1985), American writer and Gestalt therapist
- Benjamin Franklin Stevens (1833–1902), American bibliographer
- Emily Pitts Stevens (1841–1906), American educator, activist, suffragist, newspaper editor and publisher
- Helen Norton Stevens (1869–1943), American magazine editor
- Henry Stevens (bibliographer) (1819–1886), American bibliographer
- Jay Stevens (1953–2025), American freelance writer and social historian
- K. J. Stevens (born 1973), U.S. writer
- Nell Stevens (born 1985), British fiction and non-fiction writer
- Robin Stevens (born 1988), English writer
- Shane Stevens (author) (1941–2007), American crime writer
- Wallace Stevens (1879–1955), American poet

=== Visual arts ===
- Agapit Stevens (1848–1924), Belgian painter
- Alfred Stevens (sculptor) (1817–1875), British sculptor
- Alfred Stevens (painter) (1823–1906), Belgian painter
- Elizabeth Stevens (1923–2008), New Zealand painter
- Elsie Stevens (1907–?), British artist
- Henry Isaac Stevens (1806–1873), English architect
- John Calvin Stevens (1855–1940), American architect
- John Howard Stevens (1879–1958), American architect, son of John Calvin
- Nelson Stevens (1938–2022), African-American painter and muralist
- Noreen Stevens (born 1962), Canadian cartoonist

=== Music ===
- April Stevens (1929–2023), American singer
- Cat Stevens (born 1948), British musician
- Charles Joseph Stevens (1841–1911), music teacher and conductor in South Australia.
- Christian Stevens (born 1978), American rapper and producer performing under the name Iamisee
- Connie Stevens (born 1938), American singer and actress
- Denis Stevens (1922–2004), British musicologist
- Earl Tywone Stevens Sr. (born 1967), American rapper who records under the name "E-40"
- Even Stevens (songwriter), American songwriter
- Herbert Stevens IV (born 1987), American hip-hop recording artist who records under the name "Ab-Soul"
- John Stevens (drummer) (1940–1994), British drummer in Spontaneous Music Ensemble
- John Stevens (singer) (born 1987), American singer and American Idol contestant
- Leigh Howard Stevens (born 1953), marimba artist
- Matt Stevens (musician) (born 1975), English rock guitarist
- Matthew Stevens (born 1982) Canadian jazz guitarist and composer
- Mike Stevens, Canadian harmonica player
- R. J. S. Stevens (Richard John Samuel) (1757–1837), English composer and organist
- Rachel Stevens (born 1978), British singer and actress
- Ray Stevens (born 1939), American country music singer and songwriter
- Risë Stevens (1913–2013), American mezzo-soprano
- Rogers Stevens (born 1970), American guitarist
- Roy Stevens (1916–1989), American trumpeter, co-author of Stevens-Costello Triple C Embouchure Technique (1971)
- Shakin' Stevens (born 1948), Welsh rock and roll singer
- Steve Stevens (born 1959), American rock guitarist
- Sufjan Stevens (born 1975), American musician and songwriter

=== Performing arts ===
- Amber Stevens (born 1986), American actress
- Andrew Stevens (born 1955), American actor and film producer
- Angela Stevens (1925–2016), American actress
- Ashton Stevens (1872–1951), American drama critic
- Brinke Stevens (born 1954), American actress
- Brody Stevens (1970–2019), American comedian and actor
- Carrie Stevens (born 1969), American model and actress
- Craig Stevens (actor) (1918–2000), American actor
- D Stevens, American broadcast journalist, photojournalist, photographer and filmmaker
- Fisher Stevens (born 1963), American actor
- George Stevens (1904–1975), American film director
- Inger Stevens (1934–1970), American actress
- K. T. Stevens (1919–1994), American actress
- Landers Stevens (1877–1940), American actor
- Leslie Stevens (1924–1998), American television writer
- Louis Stevens (1896–1963), American screenwriter
- Michael Fenton Stevens (born 1958), British actor and comedian
- Monica Stevens (dancer), Australian dancer with the Aboriginal Islander Dance Theatre in the 1980s
- Morgan Stevens (1951–2022), American actor
- Onslow Stevens (1902–1977), American actor
- Robert Stevens (director) (1920–1989), American film director
- Ruth Stevens (1903–1989), Swedish actress
- Shadoe Stevens (born 1947), American radio host, voice actor, and television personality
- Stella Stevens (1938–2023), American actress

== Religion ==
- Abel Stevens (1815–1897), American editor, author and Methodist minister
- Thomas Stevens (bishop) (1841–1920), first Bishop of Barking

== Sports ==
- Amin Stevens (born 1990), American professional basketball player for Elitzur Kiryat Ata in Israel
- Aron Stevens (born 1982), a ring name of American professional wrestler Aron Haddad
- Asa Stevens (born 2000), American boxer
- Brad Stevens (born 1976), American basketball coach
- Chad Stevens (born 1999), American professional baseball player
- Chase Stevens (born 1979), American professional wrestler
- Curtis Stevens (boxer) (born 1985), American boxer
- Dennis Stevens (1933–2012), English footballer for Bolton Wanderers, Everton, Oldham Athletic and Tranmere Rovers
- Drew Stevens (born 2003), American football player
- Ella Stevens (born 2006), British racing driver
- Félix Stevens (born 1964), Cuban sprinter
- Gary Stevens (footballer, born 1954), English footballer
- Gary Stevens (footballer, born 1962) (born 1962), another English footballer
- Gary Stevens (footballer, born 1963), the best known of several English footballers with this name
- Gary Stevens (jockey) (born 1963), American jockey
- Gary Stevens (rugby league) (born 1944, fl. 2013), Australian rugby league player
- George Stevens (born 2005), Australian rules footballer
- Gina Stevens, retired Australian basketball player
- Greer Stevens (born 1957), South African tennis player
- Greville Stevens (1901–1970), English cricketer
- Huub Stevens (born 1953), Dutch footballer and coach
- JaCoby Stevens (born 1998), American football player
- Jessica Stevens (born 2000), American trampoline gymnast
- John Cox Stevens (1785–1857), American yacht sailor
- Kevin Stevens (born 1965), American ice hockey player
- Kia Stevens (born 1977), American women's professional wrestler
- Kirk Stevens (born 1958), Canadian professional snooker player
- Lamar Stevens (born 1997), American basketball player
- Les Stevens (footballer), (1920–1991) English footballer
- Matt Stevens (quarterback) (born 1964), American football player
- Matt Stevens (rugby union) (born 1982), British rugby union player
- Matt Stevens (safety) (born 1973), American football player
- Matthew Stevens (born 1977), Welsh professional snooker player
- Monica Stevens (born 1967), Antigua and Barbuda sprinter
- Patrick Stevens (born 1968), Belgian sprinter
- Paul Stevens (baseball) (born 1953), American college baseball coach
- R. C. Stevens (1934–2010), Major League Baseball first baseman
- Ray Stevens (wrestler) (1935–1996), American professional wrestler
- Raymond Stevens (judoka) (born 1963), English judoka
- Robyn Stevens (born 1983), American race walker
- Scott Stevens (born 1964), Canadian ice hockey player
- Thomas Stevens (cyclist) (1854–1935), British cyclist, the first person to circle the globe by bicycle
- Tommy Stevens (born 1996), American football player

== Science and technology ==
- Alexander Hodgdon Stevens (1789–1869), U.S. physician
- Austin Stevens (born 1950), South African herpetologist and documentary film maker
- Brooks Stevens (1911–1995), U.S. car designer
- Carly Stevens UK academic ecologist and soil geochemist
- Frank Lincoln Stevens (1871–1934), American mycologist and phytopathologist
- Frederick William Stevens (1847–1900), English architectural engineer who worked for the British colonial government in India
- Frederick W. Stevens (physicist) (1861–1932), American physicist who did research on gaseous explosive reactions
- George Phillip Stevens (1861–1941), Australian wireless experimenter and public servant
- Graeme Stevens (1932–2026), New Zealand palentologist and author
- John Stevens (inventor, born 1749) (1749–1838), U.S. inventor, recipient of the first American railroad charter
- John Frank Stevens (1853–1943), U.S. engineer (Great Northern Railway, Panama Canal)
- Malcolm Stevens (born 1938), English chemist and FRS
- Molly Stevens (born 1974), English biomedical researcher and professor
- Neil Everett Stevens (1887–1949), U.S. mycologist and plant pathologist
- Nettie Stevens (1861–1912), U.S. biologist and geneticist
- Perdita Stevens (born 1966), British mathematician and computer scientist
- Peter Stevens (car designer) (born 1945), British car designer
- Stanley Smith Stevens (1906–1973), U.S. psychologist
- W. Richard Stevens (1951–1999), author of UNIX and TCP/IP books

== Academia ==
- Albert K. Stevens (1901–1984), U.S. professor and activist
- Rosemary A. Stevens, American medical historian

== Business ==
- Edwin A. Stevens (1795–1868), U.S. philanthropist and entrepreneur
- Edwin Augustus Stevens Jr. (1858–1918), marine engineer and business co-founder
- John Austin Stevens (1795–1874), American banker
- Kenneth H. Stevens (1922–2005), executive of the Scouts Association
- Richard Stevens (1868–1919), French-born attorney and U.S. real estate developer
- Robert L. Stevens (1787–1856), U.S. railroad executive
- Roger L. Stevens (1910–1998), American theatrical producer, arts administrator, and real estate executive
- Simon Stevens (1974-), Disability Consultant

== Politics ==
=== Australia ===
- Bertram Stevens (1889–1973), 25th Premier of New South Wales
- Ernest James Stevens (1845–1922), Member of the Queensland Legislative Assembly and of the Queensland Legislative Council
- Henry Stevens (Australian politician) (1854–1935), Member of the Queensland Legislative Assembly
- James Stevens (Australian politician) (born 1983), Member of the Australian House of Representatives
- Ray Stevens (politician) (born 1953), Member of the Queensland Legislative Assembly

=== Canada ===
- Henry Herbert Stevens (1878–1973), Canadian politician and businessman
- Ron Stevens (1949–2014), Canadian politician
- Sinclair Stevens (1927–2016), Canadian politician

=== United States ===
- Andrew F. Stevens, African-American banker and Pennsylvania state legislator
- Audrey Stevens, American politician, New Hampshire state legislator
- Ben Stevens (1959–2022), U.S. politician, Alaska State Senator, son of Ted Stevens
- Chaz Stevens (born 1964), American political activist and entrepreneur
- Durham Stevens (1851–1908), an American diplomat and later an employee of Japan's Ministry of Foreign Affairs
- Ephraim E. Stevens (1851–1907), American architect and politician in Wisconsin
- Frederick P. Stevens (1810–1866), mayor of Buffalo, New York
- Hestor L. Stevens (1803–1864), U.S. Representative from Michigan
- Haley Stevens (born 1983), American politician
- Isaac Stevens (1818–1862), first governor of Washington Territory, brigadier general in the Union Army
- J. Christopher Stevens (1960–2012), an American diplomat and lawyer killed during the 2012 Benghazi attack in Libya
- John Stevens (New Jersey politician) (c. 1716–1792), U.S. politician, delegate to the Continental Congress
- John L. Stevens (1820–1895), U.S. diplomat
- John Paul Stevens (1920–2019), U.S. Supreme Court justice
- Richard Y. Stevens, U.S. politician (North Carolina)
- Robert T. Stevens (1899–1983), U.S. businessman and politician
- Stephen Stevens (1793–1870) Justice of the Indiana Supreme Court, abolitionist
- Ted Stevens (1923–2010), U.S. politician, U.S. Senator from Alaska
- Thaddeus Stevens (1792–1868) US Congressman from Pennsylvania, a leader of the Radical Republicans and a fierce opponent of slavery

=== Other countries ===
- Jengo Stevens, Sierra Leonean politician
- Jimmy Stevens (politician) (1910s or 1920s–1994), Ni-Vanuatu politician
- Jo Stevens (born 1966), Labour Party politician in the United Kingdom, Member of Parliament (MP) for Cardiff Central since 2015
- John Stevens, Baron Stevens of Kirkwhelpington, (born 1942), former Commissioner of the Metropolitan Police, London
- Siaka Stevens (1905–1988), former President of Sierra Leone
- Willy Stevens (born 1939), Belgian diplomat

== Military ==
- Ebenezer Stevens (1751–1823), American Revolutionary War figure and New York merchant
- Frank Douglas Stevens (1893–1977), British World War I flying ace
- Jack Stevens (1896–1969), Australian general
- Thomas Holdup Stevens (1795–1841), American naval admiral in the War of 1812
- Thomas H. Stevens, Jr. (1819–1896), American naval admiral

== History ==
- Alzina Stevens (1849–1900), American labor leader, journalist
- John Stevens (immigrant) (1682–1737), immigrant to British America, Port Collector at Perth Amboy, New Jersey
- John Austin Stevens (1827–1910), U.S. historian and businessman
- John H. Stevens (1820–1900), considered to be the first settler in the city of Minneapolis, Minnesota
- Robert Stevens (photo editor) (1938–2001), U.S. photo editor, 2001 anthrax attacks victim
- Thaddeus Stevens (1792–1868), U.S. lawyer famous for defending runaway slaves

== Miscellaneous ==
- Albert Stevens (disambiguation)
- Christine Stevens (1918–2002), American animal welfare activist and conservationist
- Daisy McLaurin Stevens (1875–1950), American socialite and clubwoman
- Michael Stevens (disambiguation)
- Gary Stevens (disambiguation)
- Joseph Stevens (disambiguation)
- Paul Stevens (disambiguation)
- Wendelle C. Stevens (1923–2010), author, ufologist, US Air Force pilot

== Fictional characters ==
- The Stevens family, in Even Stevens, U.S. comedy television program
- Stevens, the Pirates' star player, Galactik Football
- Mr. Stevens, the butler in Kazuo Ishiguro's 1989 novel The Remains of the Day
- Bebe Stevens, from TV series South Park
- Chris Stevens (Northern Exposure)
- Erik Stevens, a character from Black Panther (film)
- Izzie Stevens, Grey's Anatomy
- Niki Stevens, a character on The L Word
- Serena Stevens, a fictional character in the television series Law & Order: Criminal Intent

== See also ==
- Steven (surname)
  - Stephen, given name
- Stephens Surname
- Stephen (surname)
- Stephenson Surname
- Stevenson Surname
- Stinson (surname)
- Clan MacTavish – Stevens Associated Family Name (Sept)
