= Benjamin Stevens =

Ben or Benjamin Stevens may refer to:

- Ben Stevens (1959–2022), American politician
- Ben Stevens (cricketer) (born 1992), Jersey cricketer
- Benjamin Franklin Stevens (1833–1902), American bibliographer

== See also ==
- Ben Stephens (disambiguation)
- Ben Strevens (born 1980), English footballer
- Stevens (surname)
