= Steven (surname) =

Steven is a surname. Notable people with the surname include:

- Andrew Joseph Steven (born 1985), Scottish basketball player
- Anna Steven (born 2000), New Zealand Paralympic sprinter
- Anthony Steven (1916–1990), British television scriptwriter
- Birte Steven (born 1980), German swimmer
- Bob Steven (1937–2014),Scottish international rugby union player
- Brett Steven (born 1969), New Zealand tennis player
- Carl Steven (Carlo Steven Krakoff, 1974–2011), American child actor
- Christian von Steven (1781–1863), Finnish-born Russian botanist and entomologist
- David Steven (1878–1903), Scottish footballer
- Davis Steven, Papua New Guinea politician, deputy prime minister from 2019 to 2020
- Donald Steven (born 1945), Canadian-American composer, music educator, and academic administrator
- Gabriel Steven (born 1994), Nigerian footballer
- Grace Steven (born 1995), Papua New Guinean footballer
- Helen Steven (1942–2016), Scottish Quaker peace activist
- Henry Marshall Steven (1893–1969),Scottish forester, academic and magazine editor
- Isabella Steven, Scottish woman courted by the poet Robert Burns
- Jack Steven (born 1990), Australian rules footballer
- Jock Steven (1935–2020), Scottish rugby union player
- Julie Steven (born 1976), American tennis player and coach, and businesswoman
- Laura Steven, 21st-century English novelist
- Peter Steven (born 1959), Scottish international rugby union player
- Philip Steven (born 1995), Papua New Guinean footballer
- Raj Steven (born 1984), Azerbaijani photographer, mentor and storyteller
- Robert Steven (born 1957), Australian rules footballer
- Stewart Steven (Stefan Gustaf Cohen, 1935–2004), British newspaper editor and journalist
- Tom Steven (born 1954), Scottish footballer
- Trevor Steven (born 1963), English footballer
- William P. Steven (1908–1991), American newspaper executive

== See also ==
- Stevens (surname)
- Steven, a given name
