= Phil Stevens =

Phil Stevens may refer to:

- Phil Stevens (footballer), Australian rules footballer
- Phil Stevens (ice hockey), Canadian ice hockey player

== See also ==
- Philip Stephens (disambiguation)
- Stevens (surname)
