= Philip Stephens =

Philip Stephens may refer to:

- Sir Philip Stephens, 1st Baronet (1723–1809), First Secretary of the Admiralty
- Philip Stephens (journalist) (born 1953), English journalist and author
- Philip Pembroke Stephens (1894–1937), journalist, foreign correspondent for the Daily Express and the Daily Telegraph
- Philip Stephens (cricketer) (born 1960), English cricketer

== See also ==
- Phil Stevens (disambiguation)
- Stephens (surname)
