= Joseph Stephens (disambiguation) =

Joseph Stephens is an American musician.

Joseph or Joe Stephens may also refer to:

- Joe Stephens (footballer) (1887–1935), Australian rules footballer
- Joe Stephens (journalist), American journalist
- Joe Stephens (mayor), American politician
- Joe Stephens (basketball) (born 1973), American basketball player
- Joseph Rayner Stephens (1805–1879), Methodist minister

== See also ==
- Joseph Stevens (disambiguation)
