= Harveys Lake =

Harveys Lake or Harvey's Lake or Harvey Lake may refer to

- Harveys Lake, Pennsylvania (borough in Luzerne County)
- Harveys Lake (Pennsylvania) (lake)
- Harvey's Lake (Vermont)
