= Bernhard Arp Sindberg =

Danish traveller (1911–1983)

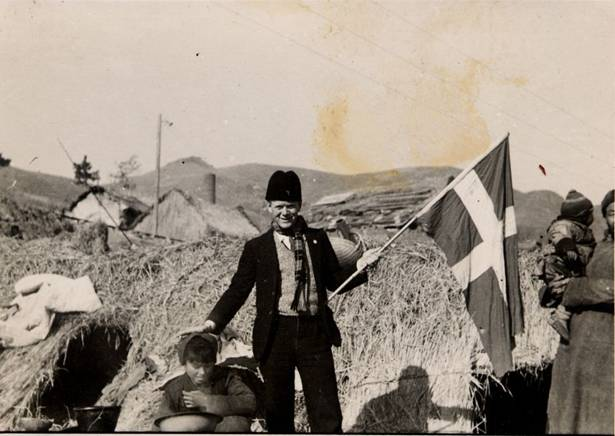
Sindberg inspects the refugee camp that he and Karl Gunther established in the northern suburb of Nanjing.

Bernhard Arp Sindberg (19 February 1911 – 1983), also known as "Mr. Xin" or "Xinbo", "The Greatest Dane", or the "Shining Buddha" was born in Aarhus, Denmark. His travels in his youth brought him to China, where he was one of few foreigners who witnessed the Nanjing Massacre. Sindberg tried to help Chinese refugees by allowing them to stay in the concrete factory where he worked as a security guard; his photos, letters and experiences later played a role in the understanding of the massacre. His efforts saved from 6,000 to 20,000 Chinese from a cruel fate, and he has been honoured on several occasions, including the title "A friend of China".

== Early life ==
Sindberg's urge to travel started in his childhood years, when he ran away as a 2-year-old, but he was found and taken home again. The second time he ran away was on a bicycle. He managed to cycle halfway across the country. The third time he travelled even further and was first stopped at the America-steamer in Hamburg, Germany. At the age of 17, he went to the U.S. for 3 years and then returned home. He joined the Foreign Legion, but was disappointed by the people and the harsh environment in the Moroccan desert; after 10 months of service, he ran off into the mountains and managed to get out of the country as a stowaway on a ship.

== The time in China ==
He arrived in China in 1934 as a stowaway on a Danish merchant ship, trapped and handcuffed in the ship's detention after a few loud arguments and scuffles with an officer on board. Sindberg escaped to further indictments and then had several different jobs, including one where he demonstrated Danish rifles to the Chinese. However, the work of the Danish Rifle Syndicate petered out, because Japan had already begun to invade China under the Second Sino-Japanese War and the Danish government did not dare to bother the Japanese.

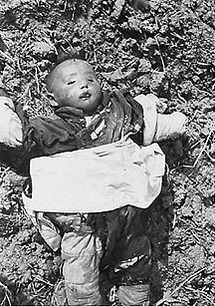
A picture of a dead child. Probably taken by Bernhard Sindberg.

When the Japanese troops occupied Shanghai, Sindberg was hired as a chauffeur for the English journalist, Pembroke Stephens, who worked for The Daily Telegraph. They drove around Shanghai the next few months, for Stephens to find material for his articles describing the war. One day, the men climbed a water tower to look at the Japanese air strike on the city; it was here that Pembroke Stephens was killed by machine gun salvo from a Japanese aircraft.

The Danish company F.L. Smidth was at that time building a concrete factory in the Chinese capital, Nanjing, and wanted to protect their investment against the Japanese rampage, so they hired Sindberg as a guard. The job was dangerous, but very well paid. Sindberg arrived in Nanjing on 2 December 1937, when he met the only other foreigner in the factory, the German Karl Gunther. After only 11 days, Japanese troops arrived and atrocities began. Sindberg went around in Nanjing and the surrounding area and documented with his camera what happened. The evidence, faded black-and-white photos and his own comments thereto, is assembled in an album, which is currently displayed at the Harry Ransom Center at the University of Texas at Austin.

Sindberg and Gunther escaped the Japanese bombing by displaying the Danish Dannebrog and the German swastika flag, two nations the Japanese had respect for and were not at war with. The Chinese civilians soon realized this and rushed to the factory and the nearby Qixia Temple. Sindberg and Gunther took them in, set up a makeshift hospital and risked their lives, as they repeatedly drove out to collect food, medicine and supplies from the Red Cross for the refugees. After six weeks, the situation started to get better for the locals, but the attacks and killings did not stop, but only slowed down. Inside the factory area, the refugees fought against disease, cold and hunger. Sindberg was starting to be under pressure, as the Japanese soldiers in the city tried to sabotage his efforts. After almost 3 months, the Japanese ran out of patience; Sindberg was dismissed and sent to Shanghai, where he took a ship to Europe.

At his arrival in Europe in 1938, Sindberg was picked up by his father in Italy. On the way home, they took a road by Geneva, where Sindberg was thanked and awarded with honours by a Chinese delegation for his efforts. Sindberg emigrated to the United States, and became a captain in the American merchant fleet. He was thanked for his efforts in the Navy during World War II in a letter by President Harry S. Truman, although the document does not state what exactly those efforts were. He lived in the U.S. for the rest of his life. He married Blair Sinberg on May 4, 1941, but they were later divorced, without having had children. Sindberg died in California in 1983.

Three of Bernhard's relatives, Bitten Andersen, Mariann Arp Stenvig, and Ole Sindberg, have been to China several times to receive honours on his behalf after his death; they have also met with survivors who have been spoken of details of Bernhard's efforts. One of them, Wang Yongli, stayed 100 days at the cement factory as a teenager. He reported to the newspaper China Daily:

"Without his help, we would not have had any chance to survive. We hope that the goodness in people like Sindberg will live on."

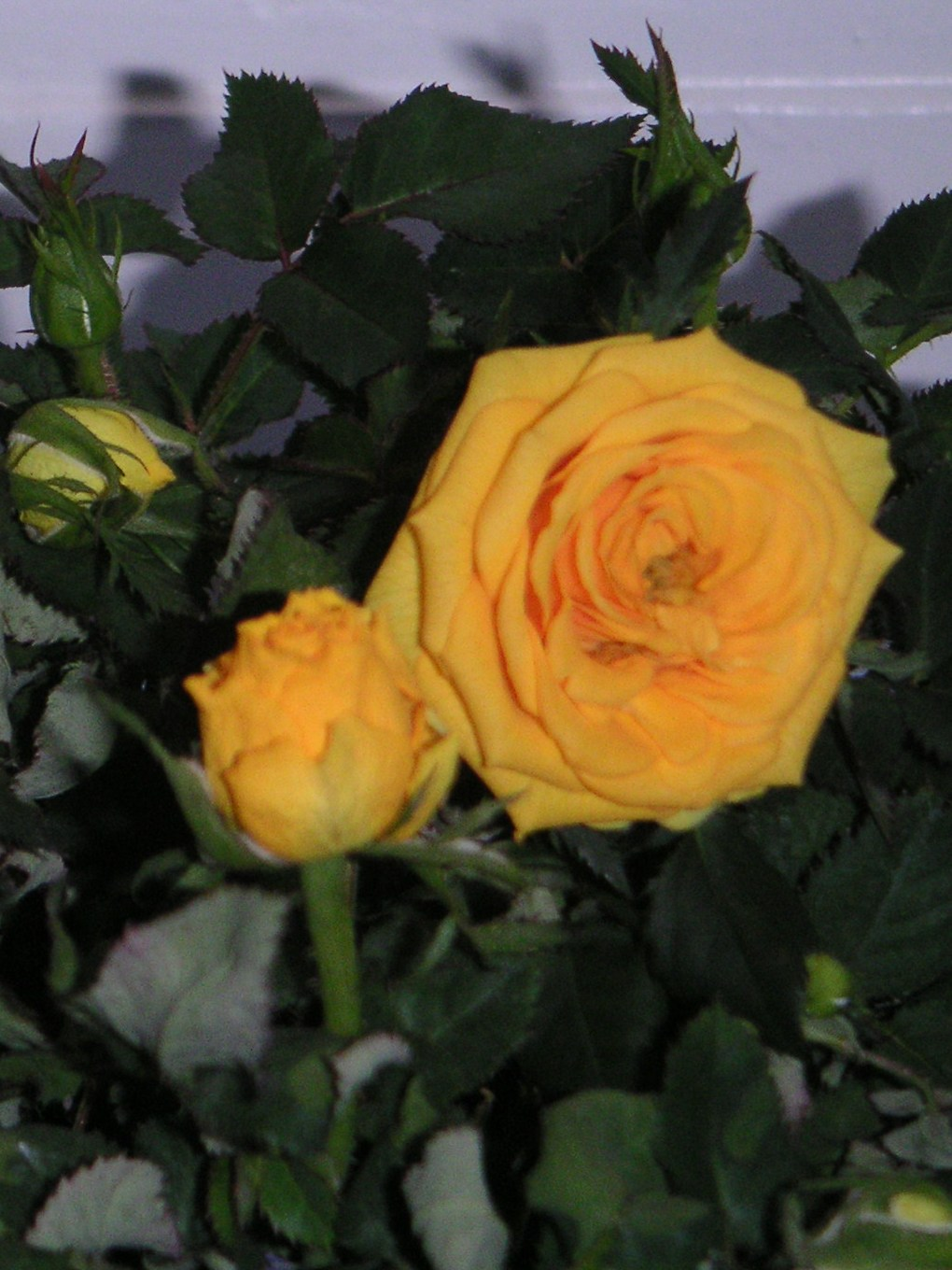
Nanjing Forever – the Sindberg Rose

On Bitten Andersen's initiative, the flower maker Rosa Eskelund named one of her yellow roses "Nanjing Forever - the Sindberg Rose". It is meant to grow in the beds outside of the Nanjing Massacre Memorial Hall in memory of Bernhard Sindberg and the Chinese refugees he rescued from the massacre.

== See also ==
- John Rabe
- Oskar Schindler
