= Les Stevens =

Les Stevens may refer to:

- Les Stevens (footballer) (1920–1991), English footballer
- Les Stevens (boxer) (born 1951), English boxer
