= Karl Günther (engineer) =

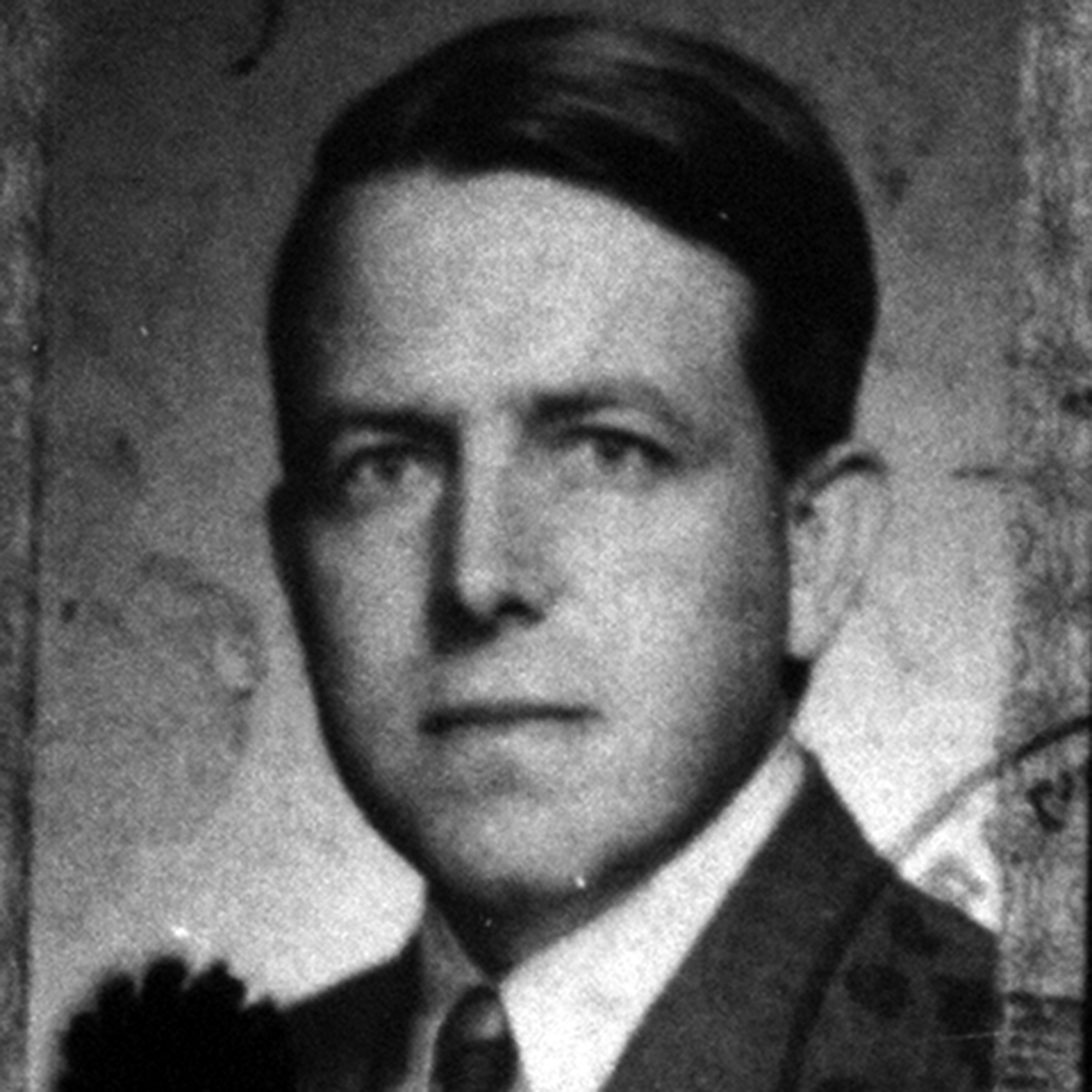
Karl Günther

Karl Günther (German: Karl Günther) (1903-1987, Chinese: 卡尔·京特), commonly referred to as Kund, Old Kund, and Mr. German Kund (Chinese: 德国昆先生), was a German engineer born in Tangshan, China.

== Biography ==
Karl Künter was born in Tangshan in the autumn of 1903 and resided in China until the late 1950s, with the exception of a period during which he returned to Germany for his studies. Following the September 18th incident, conditions worsened, prompting Künter, an employee of the Qixin Ash Company in Tangshan, to travel south and assume the role of acting director at the Jiangnan Cement Plant. In December 1937, as the Japanese army advanced towards Nanking, Karl Künter established a safety zone at the Jiangnan Cement Plant site alongside Danish national Bernhard Arp Sindberg, thereby safeguarding the lives of tens of thousands of Chinese individuals. He also observed the Nanjing Massacre and retained numerous valuable photographs and documents.

In June 1938, traffic in Nanking resumed normalcy, and the refugees in the factory were safely repatriated to their homes following Karl Künter's intervention with the Japanese authorities. Shortly after Sindberg departed from the cement factory, Kyotte remained. Following the establishment of the People's Republic of China, Karl Günter served as a chemical engineer at the Jiangnan Cement Factory. In December 1950, he left China for Germany with his wife, Edith, and their son and daughter, and did not return to China until his demise. The letters from the Qixia Temple exiles, translated by Günter, remain in the German Federal Archives in Potsdam.
