= Gary L. Stevens =

Gary L. Stevens is the name of

- Gary Stevens (politician), Gary Lee Stevens (born 1941), Republican member of the Alaska Senate
- Gary Stevens (jockey), Gary Lynn Stevens (born 1963), American Thoroughbred horse racing jockey, actor, and sports analyst

== See also ==
- Gary Stevens (disambiguation)
