= Albert Stevens (disambiguation) =

Albert Stevens was a patient who was the subject of an experiment on radiation exposure.

Albert Stevens may also refer to:

- Albert Leo Stevens (1873–1944), pioneer balloonist
- Albert William Stevens (1886–1949), US Army Air Corps officer
- Albert K. Stevens (1901–1984), American educator
