= Ji Ran =

Chinese Buddhist monk and humanitarian

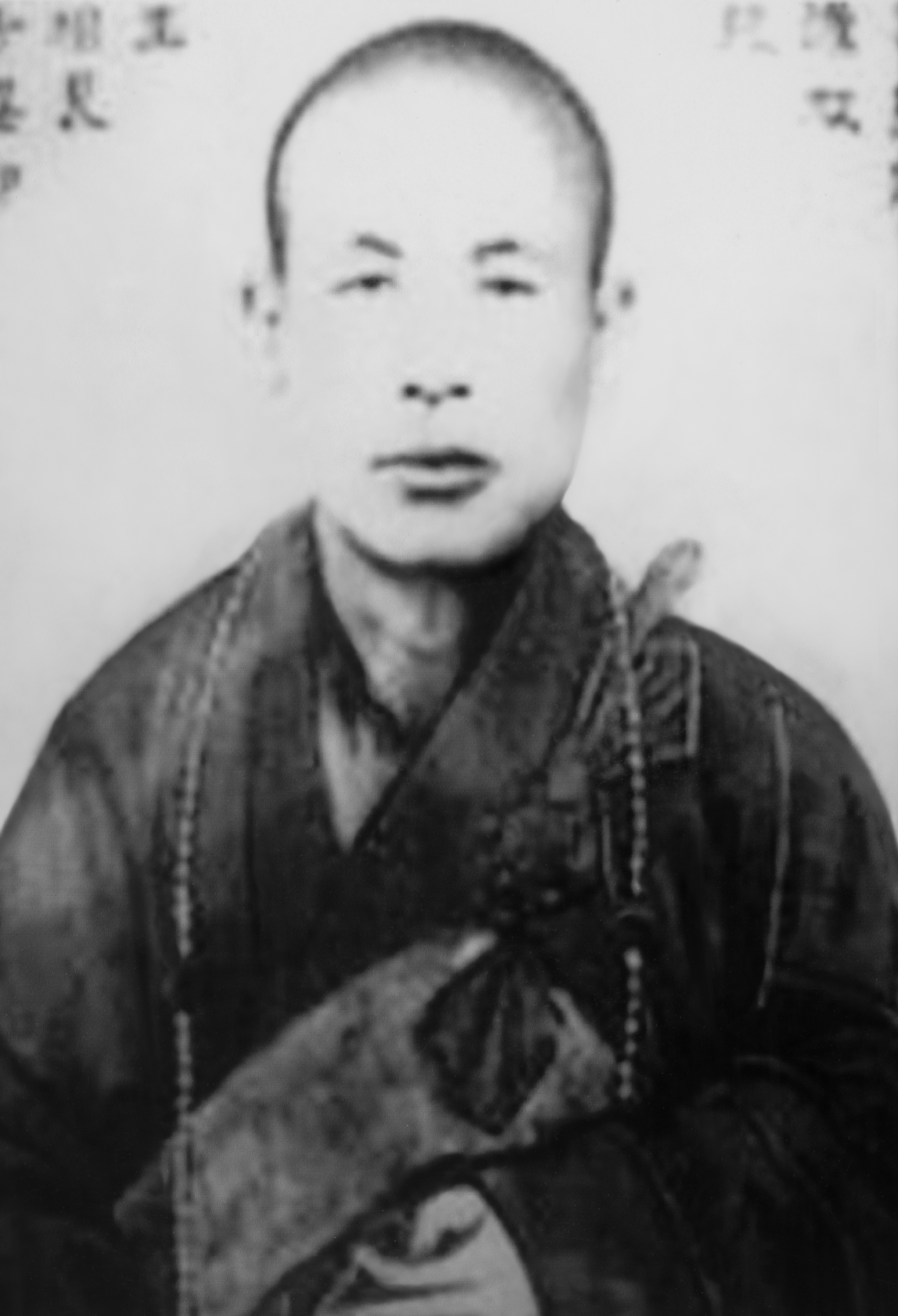
Ji Ran

Ji Ran (1893 – October 1939, Chinese: 寂然法师) was a Chinese Buddhist monk and humanitarian who orchestrated the sheltering of 24,000 refugees during the Nanjing Massacre (1937–1938). In his capacity as the supervising monk (jianyuan) of Qixia Temple in Nanjing, he founded the temple's Buddhist Refugee Shelter, the single significant sanctuary created and administered exclusively by Chinese during the horror.

== Biography ==
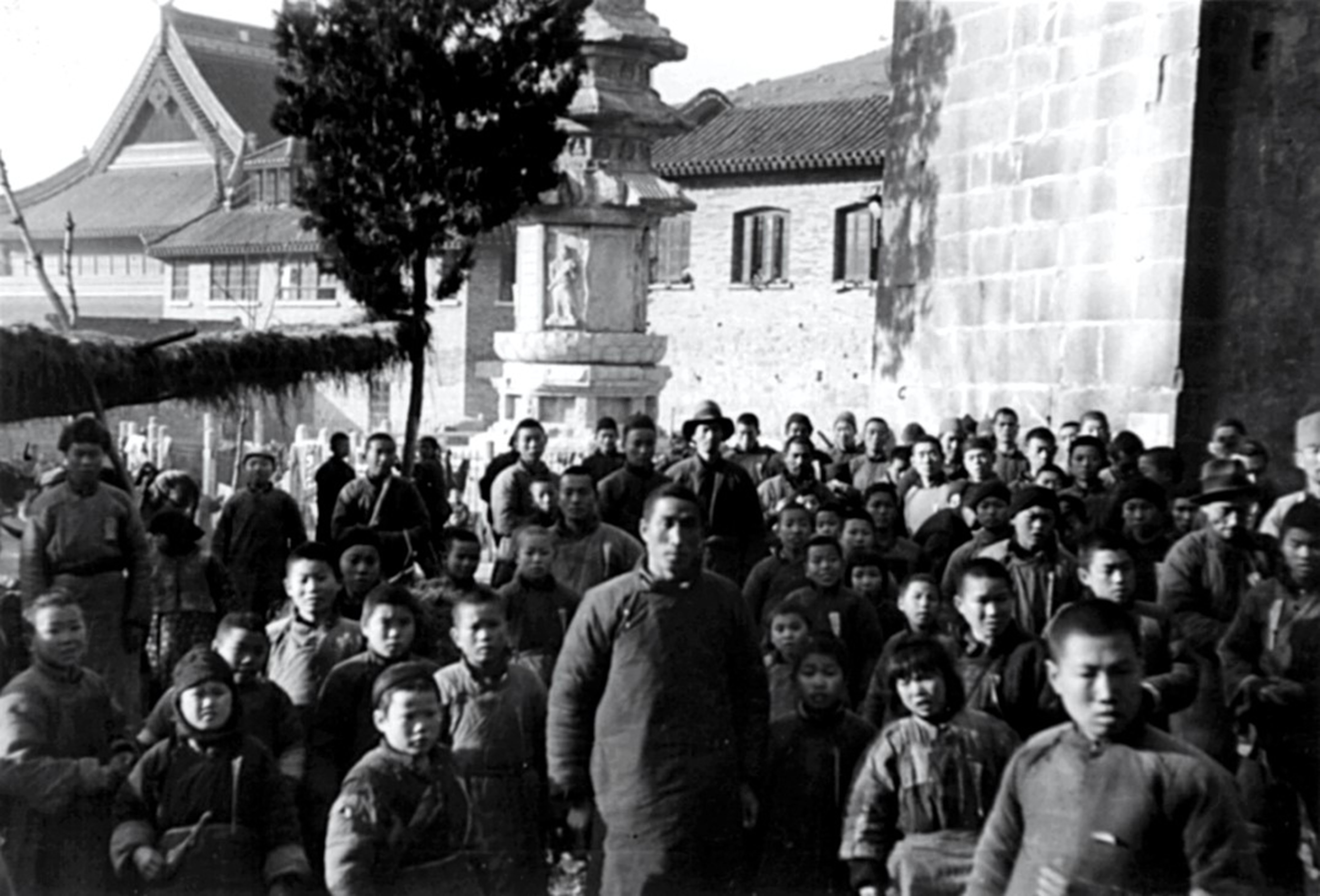
Refugees in the Qixia Temple Refugee Shelter in 1937

Born in 1893 in Dongtai County, Jiangsu Province, and bearing the prevalent surname Yan, Ji Ran entered monastic life during his adolescence. In 1909, he received the complete precepts at Baohua Temple in Zhenjiang, attended the Da Che Hall of Jiangtian Zen Monastery in Zhenjiang, and thereafter traveled to Qixia Temple in Nanjing, where he served as the supervisor of the monkhood.

In December 1937, when Japanese forces invaded Nanjing, Ji Ran, with the assistance of monks Da Ben and Zhi Kai, opened the temple gates to civilians and soldiers seeking refuge, including Nationalist officer Liao Yaoxiang, whom he concealed in the sutra repository for several days before facilitating his escape through foreign-supported networks. Despite limited resources, Ji Ran allocated 1 million jin (600 metric tons) of temple grain, limiting monks' meals to a single bowl of porridge daily to support refugees. He chronicled the crimes committed by Japanese invaders in petitions, particularly the Appeal to All Humanity (on January 25, 1938), which enumerated mass executions, sexual abuse, and the confiscation of agricultural cattle, subsequently forwarded to John Rabe and preserved in the Rabe Diaries.

To dissuade Japanese invaders, Ji Ran used a legend concerning a Buddha head that was returned following the 1923 Great Kantō earthquake, persuading troops to spare hundreds seeking refuge in the temple. He communicated with Japanese commanders via his Japanese-speaking student, Yue Ji, and once erroneously ascribed a soldier's death to an accident to avert reprisals against 20,000 refugees. Overwhelmed by these endeavors, Ji Ran died at the age of 46 in 1939. His memory is maintained in the UNESCO-listed Qixia Temple Refugee Shelter Memorial Stele and the film Qixia Temple 1937.
