= Barnet (CDP), Vermont =

Census-designated place in Vermont, United States

Barnet, Vermont
- Census-designated place
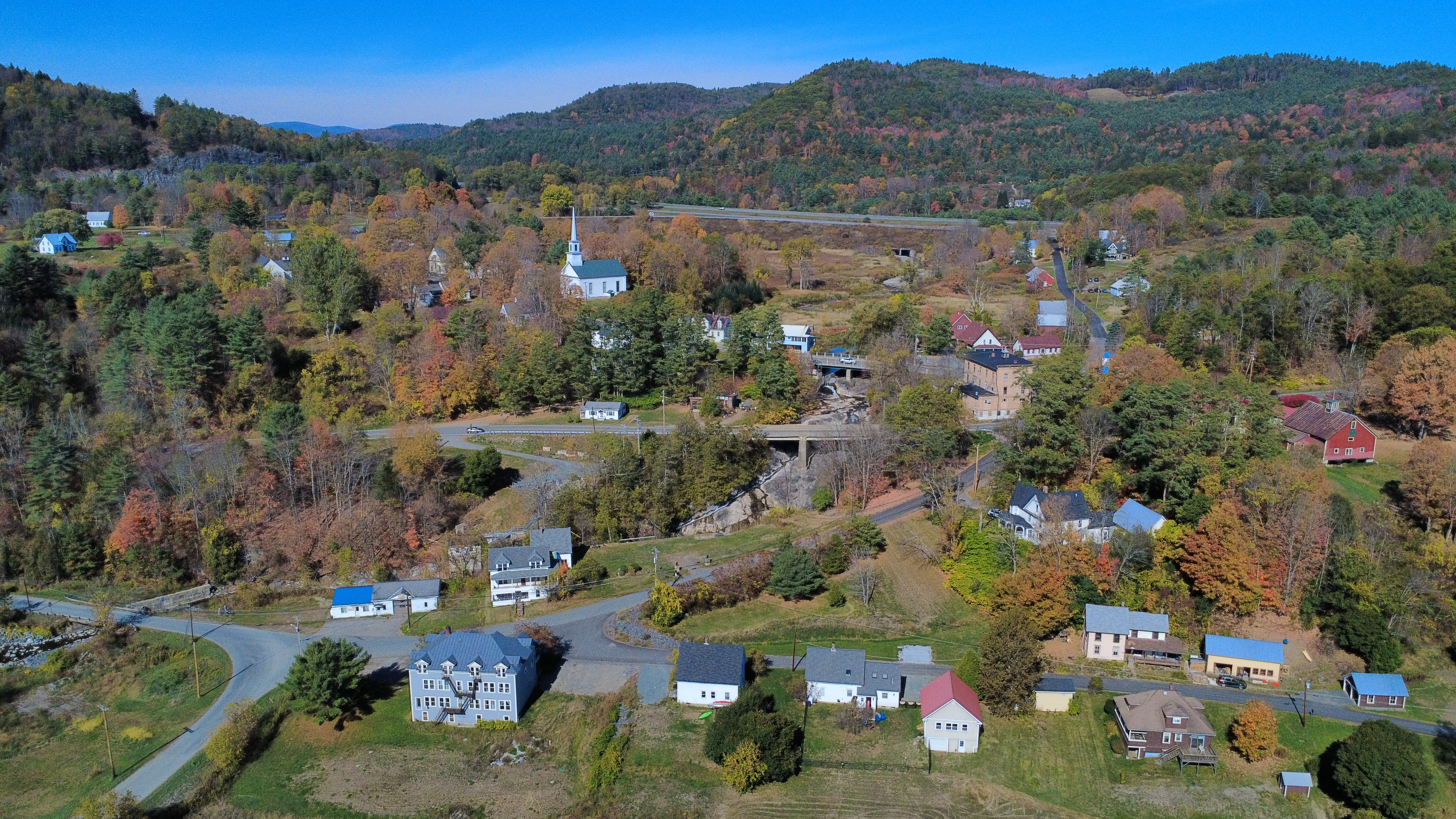
- Barnet, VT, viewed from the southeast

- Location within Vermont Location within the United States
- Coordinates: 44°17′47″N 72°2′56″W
- Country: United States
- State: Vermont
- County: Caledonia
- Town: Barnet

Area
  - Total: 0.64 sq mi (1.67 km^{2})
  - Land: 0.63 sq mi (1.62 km^{2})
  - Water: 0.019 sq mi (0.05 km^{2})
- Elevation: 571 ft (174 m)

Population (2020)
  - Total: 127
- Time zone: UTC-5 (Eastern (EST))
  - Summer (DST): UTC-4 (EDT)
- ZIP Code: 05821
- Area code: 802
- FIPS code: 50-02800
- GNIS feature ID: 2586617

Barnet is the primary village and a census-designated place (CDP) in the town of Barnet, Caledonia County, Vermont, United States. As of the 2020 census, the CDP had a population of 127, out of 1,663 in the entire town of Barnet.

The village is in southeastern Caledonia County, along the southeast edge of the town of Barnet, sitting on the west bank of the Connecticut River. It is bordered to the southeast, across the river, by the town of Monroe, New Hampshire.

Interstate 91 forms the northwest edge of the CDP, with access from Exit 18 (West Barnet Road). I-91 leads north 10 miles (16 km) to St. Johnsbury and south 50 miles (80 km) to White River Junction. U.S. Route 5 passes through the center of the village, paralleling I-91; it leads north 9 miles (14 km) to St. Johnsbury and south 11 miles (18 km) to Wells River.
