= Barnet, Vermont =

- Town
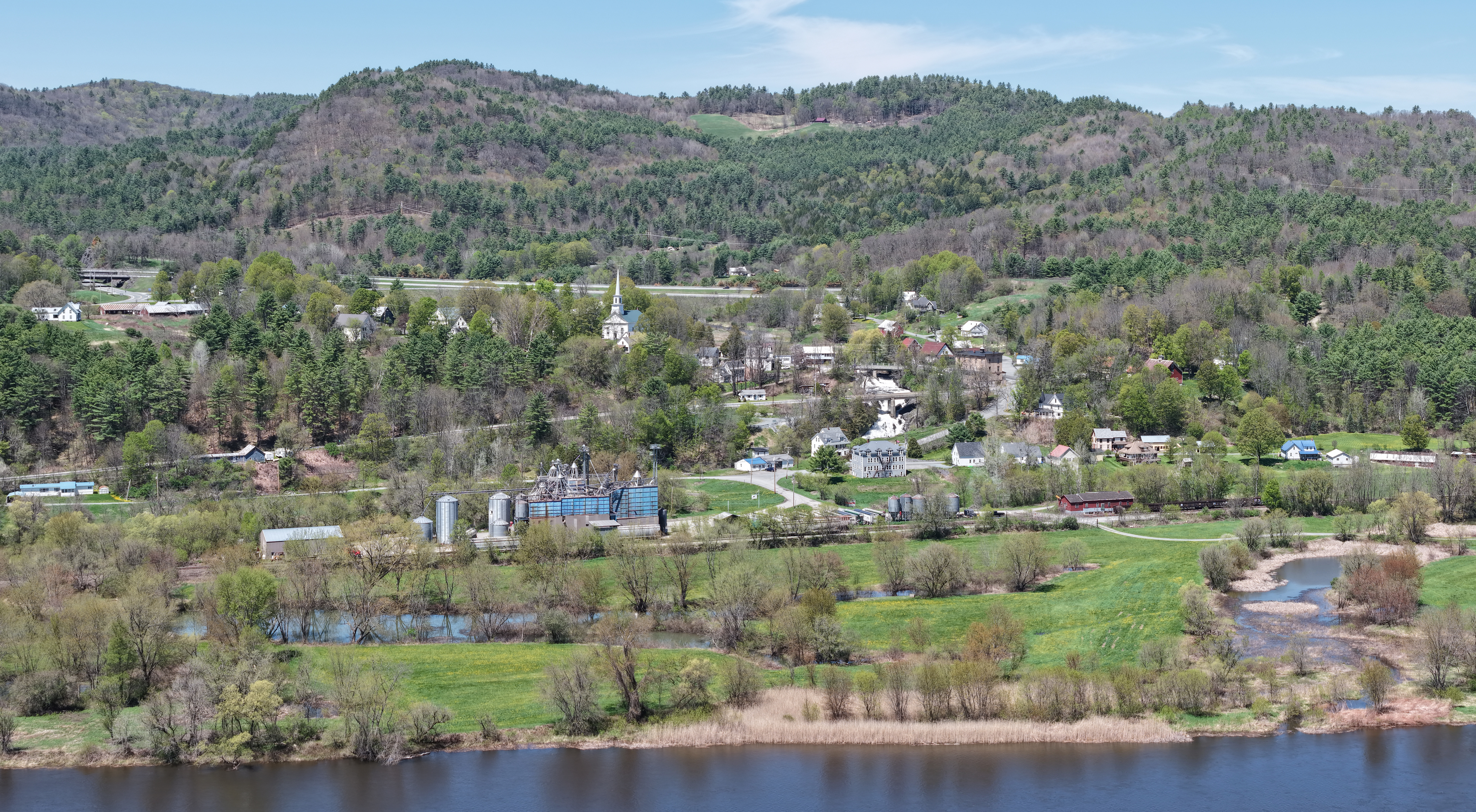
- Barnet, Vermont, from the southeast

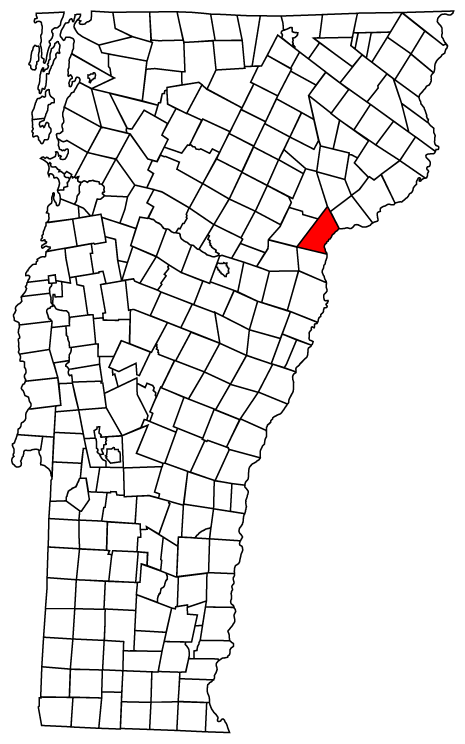
- Barnet, Vermont
- Coordinates: 44°19′49″N 72°08′40″W
- Country: United States
- State: Vermont
- County: Caledonia
- Communities: Barnet; Barnet Center; East Barnet; McIndoe Falls; Mosquitoville; Passumpsic; West Barnet

Area
  - Total: 43.6 sq mi (112.9 km^{2})
  - Land: 42.2 sq mi (109.4 km^{2})
  - Water: 1.3 sq mi (3.4 km^{2})
- Elevation: 1,122 ft (342 m)

Population (2020)
  - Total: 1,663
  - Density: 39/sq mi (15.2/km^{2})
- Time zone: UTC-5 (Eastern (EST))
  - Summer (DST): UTC-4 (EDT)
- ZIP codes: 05821 (Barnet); 05050 (McIndoe Falls); 05861 (Passumpsic); 05819)
- Area code: 802
- FIPS code: 50-02875
- GNIS feature ID: 1462034
- Website: barnetvt.org

Barnet is a town in Caledonia County, Vermont, United States. The population was 1,663 at the 2020 census. Barnet contains the locations of Barnet Center, East Barnet, McIndoe Falls, Mosquitoville, Passumpsic and West Barnet. The main settlement of Barnet is recorded as a census-designated place by the U.S. Census Bureau, with a population of 127 at the 2020 census.

== History ==
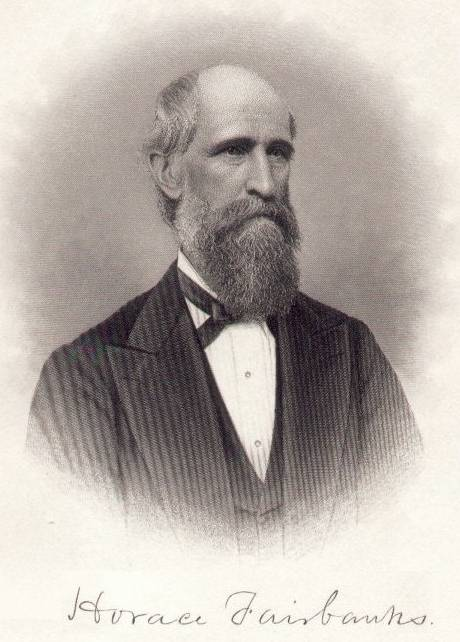
Horace Fairbanks, 36th governor of Vermont, was born in Barnet in 1820

The town of Barnet, Vermont, originally took its name from the town of Barnet, England.

On September 16, 1763, the town received its charter from the royal governor of New Hampshire, Benning Wentworth.

The first European descendants to work the land and stay in the town were three brothers, Daniel, Jacob, and Elijah Hall, along with Jonathan Fowler. Their homestead was built along the Connecticut River and to the north near McIndoe Falls. Elijah Hall built the first house in Caledonia County in Barnet, near the base of Stevens Falls. Colonel Alexander Harvey came from Dundee, Scotland, for those in the town who wished to find new land in the American colonies. Despite losing contact with almost all of them after the American Revolution broke out, he decided to stay, claiming 7,000 acres (28 km^{2}) of land and a lake, now known as Harvey's Lake.

The five early villages within the town of Barnet were:

- Barnet village (formerly called Stevens Village) located at the falls in the river
- McIndoe Falls (also referred to as McIndoes) near the southeast corner of the town lying along a terrace at the falls
- Passumpsic village (formerly called Kendall's Mills) in the northeast part of the town and spreading into the adjoining town of Waterford
- East Barnet (in 1875 named Norrisville), near the mouth of the river just before it enters the deep gorge
- West Barnet at the outlet of Harvey Lake, on the road from Barnet village to Peacham.

Additional hamlets that have arisen within the town are:

- Mosquitoville, located south of Harvey Lake
- Barnet Center, on the road from Barnet village to West Barnet.

West Barnet and Harvey's Lake, VT, from the north

The main settlement of Barnet village has grown in population and is often referred to as "the town", yet the town itself includes the populated places listed above. Two governors of the state of Vermont were from Barnet: Erastus Fairbanks, who served two terms from 1852–1853 and 1860–1861, and his son, Horace Fairbanks, who served from 1876 to 1878. The Fairbanks family left Barnet for nearby St. Johnsbury, where they were known for manufacturing the first platform scale.

Ocean explorer and scuba inventor Jacques Cousteau had influential experiences on Harvey's Lake as a young boy in the early 1920s. While attending a summer camp he experimented with staying underwater by breathing through hollow reeds found in the lake shallows. Though he could not yet swim well, this allowed him to stay underwater for extended periods.

=== Religion ===
==== Christianity ====
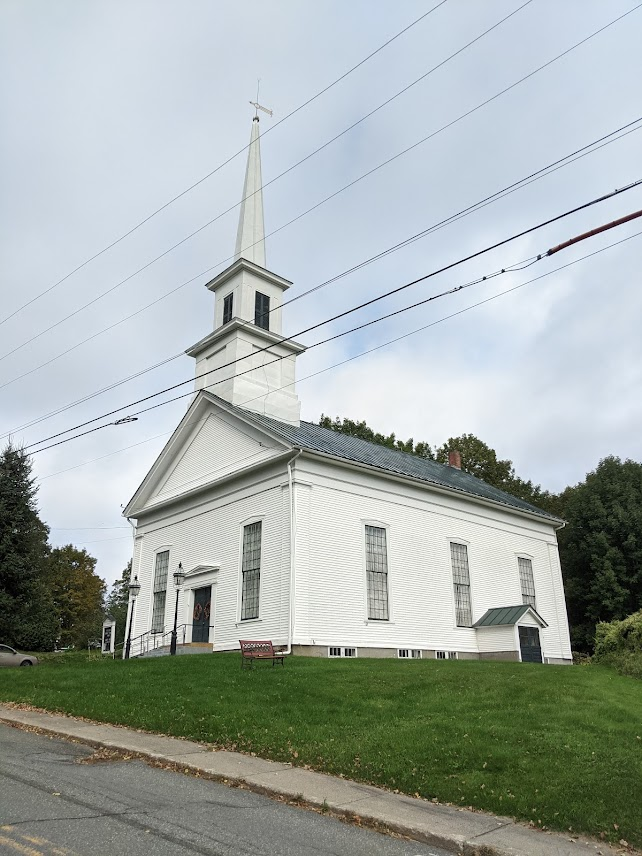
Formerly Barnet Congregational Church, now Barnet Village Church.

On January 24, 1784, the town of Barnet voted unanimously to make the Presbyterian denomination the official one of the town, as it was "founded on the word of God as expressed in the Confession of Faith, Catechisms Longer and Shorter, with the form of church government agreed upon by the Assembly of Divines at Westminster, and practiced by the Church of Scotland."

The Passumpsic Calvinistic Baptist church was first created by a council of neighboring churches on July 1, 1812. The village of Passumpsic was chosen due to its centralized location.

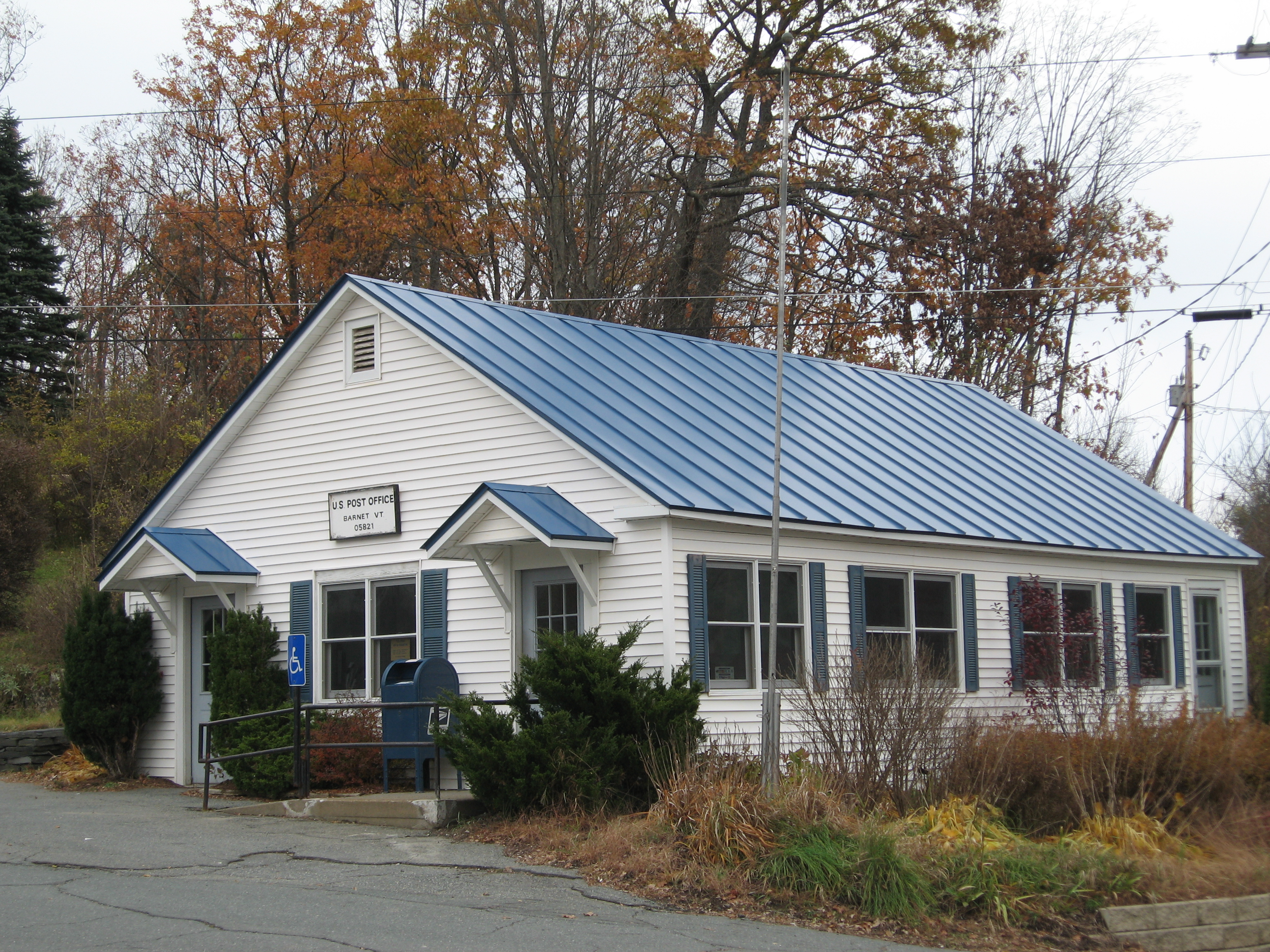
Barnet's Post Office

The First Congregational Church of Barnet was created by Reverend David Sutherland in September 1829 after a new brick church had been built. Its first permanent minister was the Reverend Henry Fairbanks. The church which stands now was constructed in 1854.

The earliest Reformed Presbyterian Church in Vermont was organized in Ryegate in October 1798. In the early part of the nineteenth century, a group of members in Barnet built a new meeting house on the land formerly owned by Walter Harvey, and the property has gone by that name since then. The longest-tenured minister was Daniel C. Faris, who served the congregation from 1873 until 1923. The congregation's Barnet branch became a separate congregation on July 9, 1872, and it continued until disorganization in 1970.

==== Buddhism ====
In 1970, upon his arrival in North America, Chögyam Trungpa established the teaching center "Tail of the Tiger" (now Karmê Chöling). It was consolidated with others in Colorado in 1973.

== Geography ==
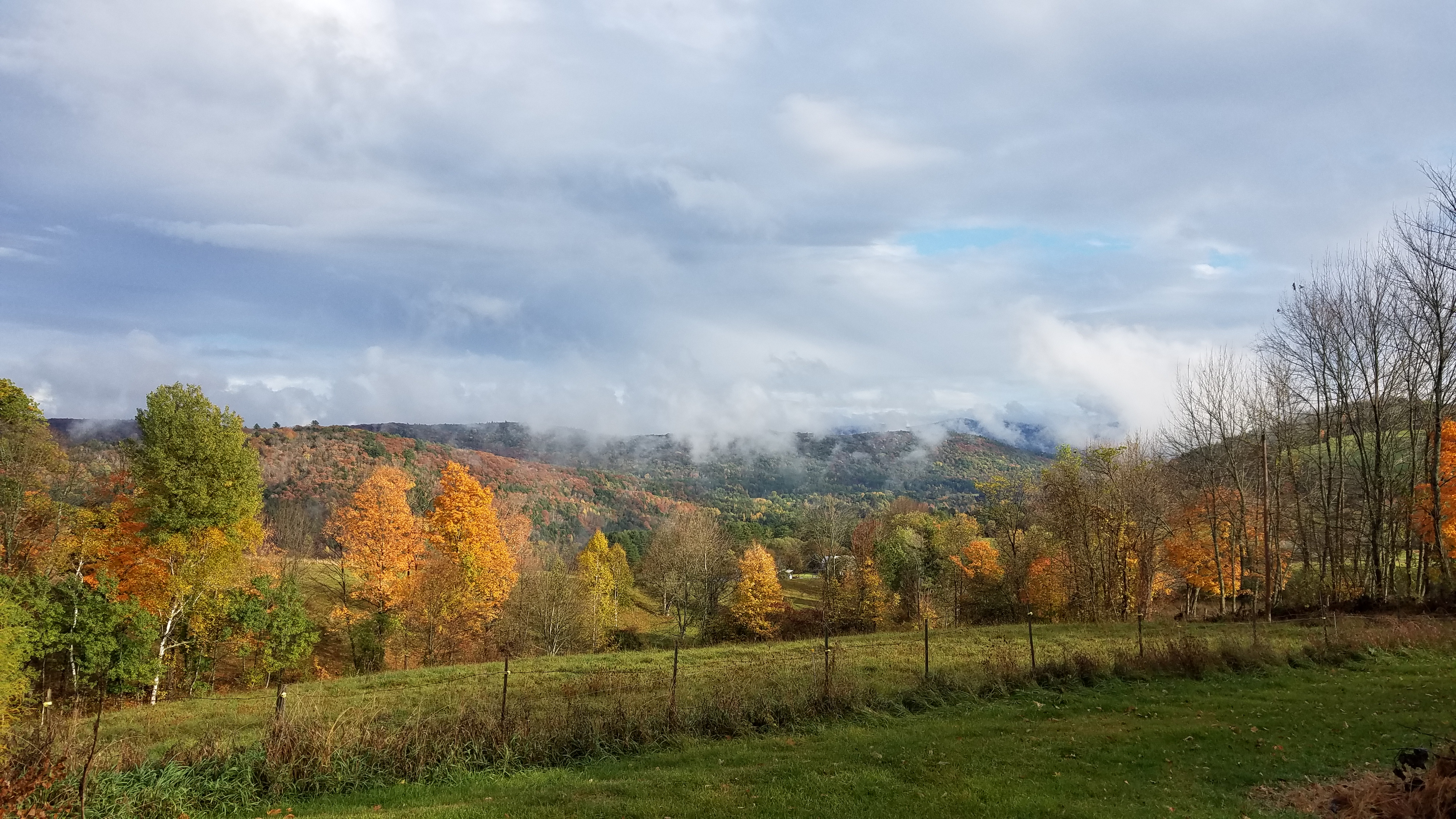
Fall foliage in early October

According to the United States Census Bureau, the town has a total area of 43.6 square miles (112.9 km^{2}), of which 42.2 square miles (109.4 km^{2}) is land and 1.3 square miles (3.4 km^{2}), or 3.04%, is water. The Barnet CDP, comprising the town center, has a total area of 0.64 square miles (1.66 km^{2}), of which 0.62 square miles (1.61 km^{2}) is land and 0.019 square miles (0.05 km^{2}), or 2.96%, is water.

The eastern border of the town is the Connecticut River, which is also the boundary between Vermont and New Hampshire. The Passumpsic River enters the Connecticut at East Barnet. Neighboring communities are Ryegate to the south, Groton to the southwest, Peacham to the west, Danville to the northwest, St. Johnsbury to the north, and Waterford, Vermont, to the northeast. Across the Connecticut River is the New Hampshire town of Monroe.

Barnet is traversed from north to south by Interstate 91, with access to the town at Exit 18, West Barnet Road. U.S. Route 5, a two-lane highway, parallels I-91 and passes through the town center.

The highest point in town is 2,103-foot (641 m) Roy Mountain in the southern part of town, east of Harvey Lake.

=== Climate ===
This climatic region is typified by large seasonal temperature differences, with warm to hot summers and cold winters. According to the Köppen Climate Classification system, Barnet has a humid continental climate, abbreviated "Dfb" on climate maps.

Climate data for Barnet, Vermont
Month	Jan	Feb	Mar	Apr	May	Jun	Jul	Aug	Sep	Oct	Nov	Dec	Year
Mean daily maximum °C	−3.2	−2.1	3.9	10.7	18.9	24.4	27.0	25.9	21.8	15.3	6.6	−1.3	12.3
Daily mean °C	−9.9	−9.2	−2.5	4.6	11.8	17.4	20.2	19.1	15.0	8.7	1.7	−6.7	5.8
Mean daily minimum °C	−16.6	−16.4	−9.0	−1.5	4.6	10.3	13.3	12.3	8.3	2.1	−3.2	−12.1	−0.7
Average precipitation mm	51	48	5	72	83	84	98	89	83	78	86	62	888
Average snowfall cm	43.9	46.5	29.5	7.4	0.2	—	—	—	—	0.2	13.2	37.9	179.1
Mean daily maximum °F	26.2	28.2	39.0	51.3	66.0	75.9	80.6	78.6	71.2	59.5	43.9	29.7	54.1
Daily mean °F	14.2	15.4	27.5	40.3	53.2	63.3	68.4	66.4	59.0	47.7	35.1	19.9	42.4
Mean daily minimum °F	2.1	2.5	15.8	29.3	40.3	50.5	55.9	54.1	46.9	35.8	26.2	10.2	30.7
Average precipitation inches	2.0	1.9	0.2	2.8	3.3	3.3	3.9	3.5	3.3	3.1	3.4	2.4	35.0
Average snowfall inches	17.3	18.3	11.6	2.9	0.1	—	—	—	—	0.1	5.2	14.9	70.5
Average precipitation days	13	12	12	13	13	13	12	11	11	11	14	13	148

== Demographics ==
Historical population
Census	Pop.	Note	%±
1790	477		—
1800	858		79.9%
1810	1,301		51.6%
1820	1,488		14.4%
1830	1,764		18.5%
1840	2,030		15.1%
1850	2,521		24.2%
1860	1,994		−20.9%
1870	1,945		−2.5%
1880	1,907		−2.0%
1890	1,897		−0.5%
1900	1,763		−7.1%
1910	1,707		−3.2%
1920	1,685		−1.3%
1930	2,604		54.5%
1940	1,596		−38.7%
1950	1,425		−10.7%
1960	1,445		1.4%
1970	1,342		−7.1%
1980	1,338		−0.3%
1990	1,415		5.8%
2000	1,690		19.4%
2010	1,708		1.1%
2020	1,663		−2.6%
U.S. Decennial Census

As of the census of 2000, there were 1,690 people, 638 households, and 440 families residing in the town. The population density was 39.9 people per square mile (15.4/km^{2}). There were 831 housing units at an average density of 19.6 per square mile (7.6/km^{2}). The racial makeup of the town was 96.75% White, 0.71% African American, 1.01% Native American, 0.47% Asian, 0.06% from other races, and 1.01% from two or more races. Hispanic or Latino of any race were 0.36% of the population.

There were 638 households, out of which 32.4% had children under the age of 18 living with them, 58.5% were married couples living together, 7.7% had a female householder with no husband present, and 30.9% were non-families. 26.0% of all households were made up of individuals, and 12.5% had someone living alone who was 65 years of age or older. The average household size was 2.57 and the average family size was 3.11.

In the town, the population was spread out, with 26.7% under the age of 18, 6.5% from 18 to 24, 25.2% from 25 to 44, 27.5% from 45 to 64, and 14.0% who were 65 years of age or older. The median age was 40 years. For every 100 females, there were 100.0 males. For every 100 females age 18 and over, there were 97.1 males.

The median income for a household in the town was $36,089, and the median income for a family was $43,403. Males had a median income of $32,768 versus $23,173 for females. The per capita income for the town was $17,690. About 7.0% of families and 12.1% of the population were below the poverty line, including 17.4% of those under age 18 and 11.2% of those age 65 or over.

== Notable people ==
- George H. Amidon, Vermont State Treasurer
- Neko Case, musician
- Taylor Coppenrath, professional basketball player
- Jacques Cousteau, ocean explorer and SCUBA inventor. Summer resident who made his first dive at Harvey's Lake
- Jay Craven, filmmaker; Marlboro College film professor
- Horace Fairbanks, 36th governor of Vermont from 1876 to 1878, was born in Barnet
- Ralph Flanders, mechanical engineer, industrialist and politician
- Luis Guzman, actor
- Chris Hedges, author
- Henry Clay Ide, statesman and judge
- Anne Morrow Lindbergh, author and aviator; died in Passumpsic (2001)
- Harvey T. Moore, Vermont and Wisconsin state legislator, was born in Barnet
- Benjamin Franklin Stevens, bibliographer
- Henry Stevens, bibliographer
