= Joseph Stevens =

Joseph Stevens may refer to:

- Joseph Stevens (painter) (1816–1892), Belgian painter
- Joseph Stevens (archaeologist) (1818–1899), British archaeologists
- Joseph Edward Stevens Jr. (1928–1998), United States federal judge

== See also ==
- Joe Stevens (born 1938), American photographer
- Joseph Stephens (disambiguation)
