= Passumpsic, Vermont =

- Village
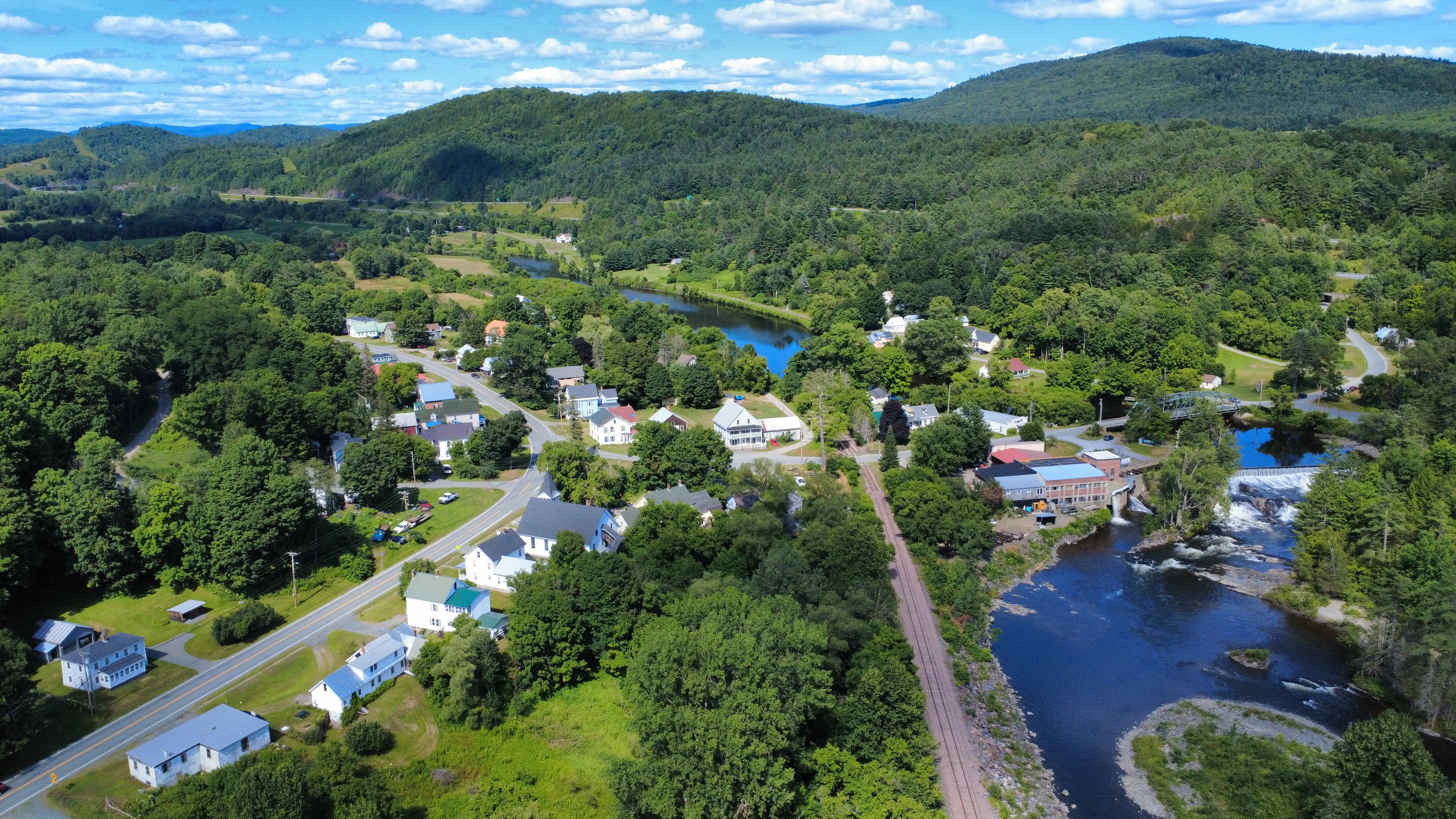
- View of Passumpsic, VT, from the southwest

- Location within Vermont
- Coordinates: 44°22′36″N 72°01′39″W
- Country: United States
- State: Vermont
- County: Caledonia
- Elevation: 545 ft (166 m)
- Time zone: UTC-5 (Eastern (EST))
  - Summer (DST): UTC-4 (EDT)
- ZIP code: 05861
- Area code: 802
- GNIS feature ID: 1458901

Passumpsic is an unincorporated village in the town of Barnet, Caledonia County, Vermont, United States. The community is located along U.S. Route 5 and the Passumpsic River 3 miles (4.8 km) south of St. Johnsbury. Passumpsic has a post office with ZIP code 05861.
