= Ben Stephens =

Ben Stephens may refer to:

- Ben Stephens (basketball) (1916–1966), American basketball player
- Ben Stephens (baseball) (1867–1896), American baseball player
- Ben Stephens, Lord Stephens of Creevyloughgare, Northern Ireland judge
- Ben Stephens (footballer) (born 1997), English footballer

== See also ==
- Benjamin Stevens (disambiguation)
- Stephens (surname)
