= Joseph Stevens (archaeologist) =

British medical doctor and archaeologist

Joseph Stevens (14 April 1818 – 7 April 1899) was a British archaeologist, former medical doctor, and antiquarian. Stevens was a significant contributor to the archaeological field and is noted for being the first curator of Reading Museum. Stevens died in St Mary Bourne, Hampshire, at the age of 81.

== Personal life ==
Stevens was born in Stanmore, Berkshire to a yeoman farmer. Little more is known about the identity of his parents. Prior to medical school, he inherited a small sum from his uncle which was to be put toward his education.

Originally training as a chemist, Stevens subsequently trained at the Middlesex Hospital, London, qualifying as a surgeon. Stevens then moved to St Mary Bourne, Hampshire, a parish 3 miles from Whitchurch, to work as the village doctor (1844–1879) where he met and married Mary Laura Longman in 1854, the daughter of William Longman. Upon his retirement in 1879, Stevens moved to Reading, Berkshire as a widower to pursue his archaeological and geological interests.

== Medical career ==
Stevens' success in the field of medicine, and his philanthropy, has been well recorded in John Isherwoods' Dr Joseph Stevens of St Mary Bourne (2015). Isherwood examines Stevens' work at St Mary Bourne, which at the time was a poor rural parish, at a time where Victorian public health reformers and legislation were being continuously improved.

Whilst appointed as Medical Officer, Stevens reported that disease was being spread by polluted water and poor hygiene and informed support for significant health legislations including the 1866 Sanitary Act which had been hastened by the cholera epidemic.

== Life in Reading ==
Following the loss of his wife in 1874 and his retirement in 1879, Stevens moved to Reading to pursue his personal interests. Outside of his medical career, Stevens was fascinated with history, geology, botany, and archaeology and wrote detailed finds on his collections. He took up his own archaeological digs and eventually found Palaeolithic implements in the Reading drift gravels and excavated sites at Gas Works Lane and at Cemetery Junction in Reading. All items found, including medieval pottery, were donated to the Reading Museum.

Stevens was appointed Honorary Curator of Reading Museum in 1884, a year after it had opened. He has been heralded by past curator of natural history at Reading Museum, David Norton, for his approach towards curating, citing that he can be perceived as a "pioneer in seeing museums not as cabinets of curiosities but as places of education and particularly of their localities" after discussing how Stevens refused a chipped off stone fragment from Stonehenge out of concern that it would promote further destruction.

In 1882, before official appointment as Honorary Curator, Stevens recorded The Bland Collection, a large eclectic collection, donated by Horatio Bland, merchant and artefact collector.

After promoting Reading Museum for over a decade, on the 20 August 1891 in Reading Town Hall, Stevens was presented his own marble bust which had been commissioned in his honour and paid for by public subscription. The bust was intended to be placed at the entrance of the museum.

== Death ==
Stevens lived in Reading until his death on 7 April 1899. His body was moved to St Mary Borne where he was buried next to his wife Mary who had died in 1874.

At the time of his death, Stevens was a member of the Royal College of Physicians London, and the British Archaeological Association. Prior to his death, Stevens had also been a local member of council for Berkshire and Hampshire, Honorary Curator of both Reading Museum and Andover Museum, and an established author.

== Works ==
- A Parochial History of St Mary Bourne with an account of Hurstbourne Priors Hants (Hampshire, 1888)
- Antiquarian Intelligence, Journal of British Archaeological Association, vol. 38, 1882, pp. 33–348
- On the Remains Found in an Anglo-Saxon Tumulus at Taplow, Bucks., Journal of British Archaeological Association, vol. 40, 1884, pp. 61–71
- Palaeolithic Flint Implements, with Mammalian Remains, in the Quaternary Drift at Reading, Journal of the British Archaeological Association, vol. 37, 1881, pp. 1–11
- Remains Found at the Reading Gas Works, Journal of the British Archaeological Association, vol. 37, 1881, pp. 264–268
- St Mary Borne Past and Present (1863)
- Stone Implements Found in the Thames River, Journal of British Archaeological Association, vol. 39, 1883, pp. 344–346
- The Font at St Mary Bourne, Journal of British Archaeological Association, vol. 36, 1880, pp. 30–33
