= Raj Steven =

Azerbaijani photographer, mentor, blogger and storyteller

- Born: 2 August 1984 (age 41); Sumqayit, Azerbaijan SSR, Soviet Union
- Education: Mimar Sinan Fine Arts University
- Occupations: Photographer, storyteller
- Organization: Silver Group int.
- Spouse: Gumush Steven (m. 2013)
- Website: rajsteven.com

Raj Steven (born 2 August 1984) is an Azerbaijani photographer, mentor and storyteller.

== Biography ==
Raj Steven was born in Sumgayit on 2 August 1984. As a child he studied piano. He won a camera in a piano competition, and became interested in photography. He studied photography in Turkey, and later worked with peacekeepers in Afghanistan.

== Career ==
=== Photography career ===
In 2001, Steven entered the Photography Department at the Mimar Sinan Fine Arts University in Istanbul, Turkey, and in 2005, he successfully completed his study. In 2005–2006, he participated to master classes in Sweden to study innovations in the art of photography.

Starting in 2006, he began his professional career in the field of photography.

In 2007, Steven went to Turkey and started to continue his actions in the field of photography there. Besides this, he became closely acquainted with and learned program languages, sociology, and psychology from professional teachers in this area.

Returning to Baku in October 2009, he began to work for ANS TV.

Since 2016, he has been engaged in teaching the sociological and psychological aspects of photography.

In 2017, he held a master class on architectural photography in Istanbul, and in 2018, a master class on "photo technics" was organized by the company Canon Azerbaijan.

== Published works ==
- 2014 – Discovery Azerbaijan – Azerbaijan nature
- 2016 – V-Nine Fashion Project

== See also ==
- List of Azerbaijani artists
- List of photographers
