= Henry Stevens (bibliographer) =

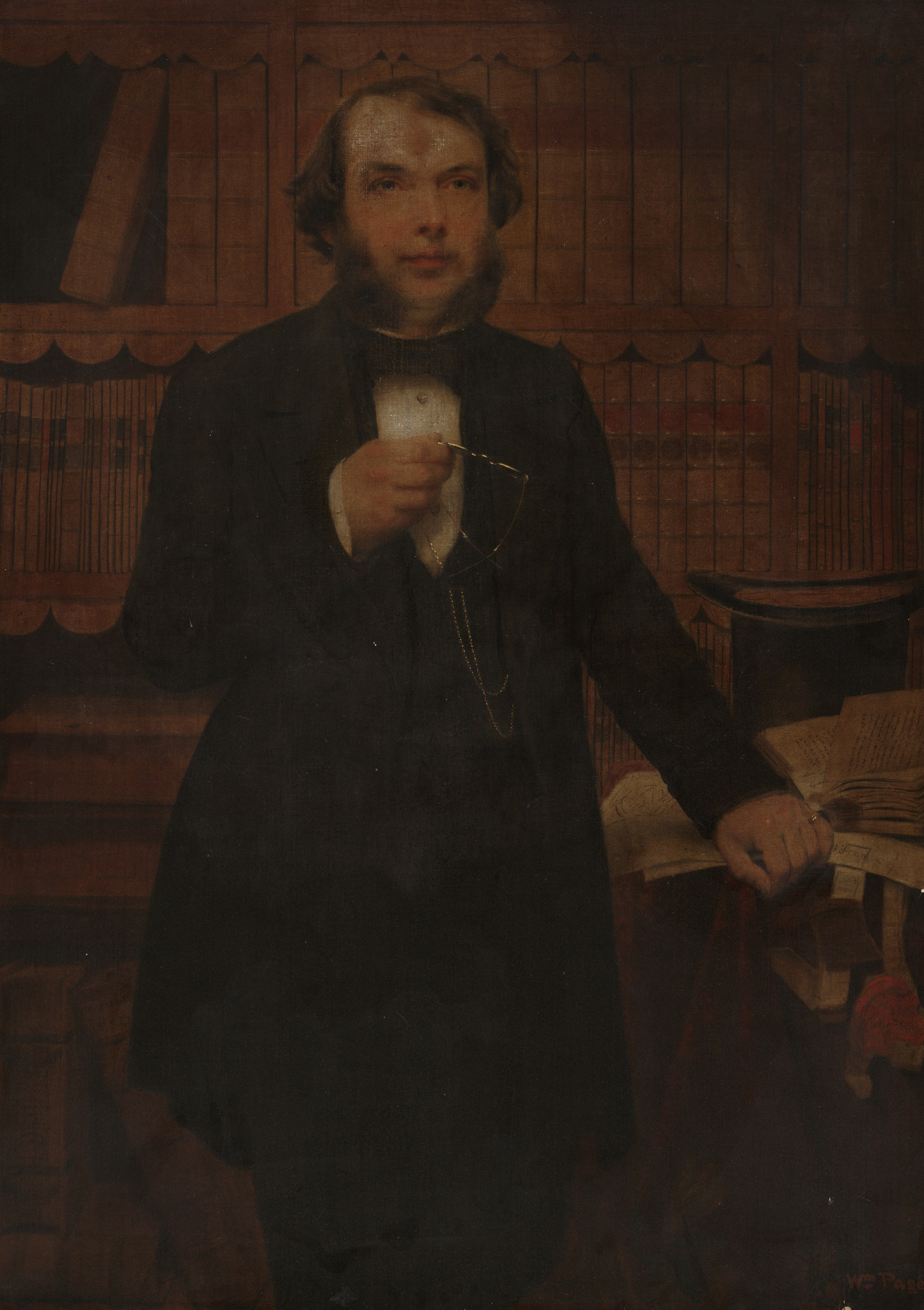
- Born: 24 August 1819
- Died: 28 February 1886; London
- Occupations: Writer, antiquarian bookseller

Henry Stevens (August 24, 1819 – February 28, 1886) was an American bibliographer.

== Biography ==
Stevens was born in Barnet, Vermont. He studied at Middlebury College, Vermont, in 1838–1839, graduated at Yale in 1843, where he was a member of Skull and Bones, and studied at Harvard Law School in 1843–1844. In 1845 he went to London, where he was employed during most of the remainder of his life as a collector of Americana for the British Museum and for various public and private American libraries.

He was engaged by Sir Anthony Panizzi, librarian of the British Museum, to collect historical books, documents, journals, etc., concerning North and South America; and he was purchasing agent for the Smithsonian Institution and for the Library of Congress, as well as for James Lenox, of New York, for whom he secured much of the valuable Americana in the Lenox library in that city, and for the John Carter Brown library, at Providence, Rhode Island. He became a member of the Society of Antiquaries in 1852, and in 1877 was a member of the committee which organized the Caxton Exhibition, for which he catalogued the collection of Bibles. Stevens was elected a member of the American Antiquarian Society in 1854. He died at South Hampstead, England, on February 28, 1886. His brother, Benjamin Franklin Stevens, was also a bibliographer.

His principal compilations and publications were:

- an Analytical Index to the Colonial Documents of New Jersey in the State Paper Office in England (1858), constituting vol. v. of the New Jersey Historical Society's Collections
- Collection of Historical Papers relating to Rhode Island ... 1640–1775 (6 vols), for the John Carter Brown Library
- historical indexes of the colonial documents relating to Maryland (10 vols), now in the library of the Maryland Historical Society
- a collection of papers relating to Virginia for the period 1585–1775, incomplete, deposited in the Virginia state library in 1858
- a valuable Catalogue of American Maps in the Library of the British Museum (1856)
- catalogues of American, of Mexican and other Spanish-American and of Canadian and other British North American books in the library of the British Museum
- Historical and Geographical Notes on the Earliest Discoveries in America, 1153–1530, with Comments on the Earliest Maps and Charts, etc. (1869)
- Sebastian Cabot/John Cabot (1870)
- The Bibles in the Caxton Exhibition, 1877 (1878)
- Recollections of Mr James Lenox, of New York, and the Formation of his Library (1886).
- The unpublished papers of Henry Stevens, bookdealer, (2½ linear feet) are deposited in the William L. Clements Library, University of Michigan, Ann Arbor, MI. Some additional papers are deposited in the Yale University Library, and the Charles E. Young Research Library at the University of California, Los Angeles.
- The Henry Stevens Ptolemy Collection (of early editions of Ptolemy's Geography) was assembled by Henry Stevens and, after his death, by his son Henry N. Stevens — the latter published a catalogue of the collection.

== The Life of Thomas Hariot and the "Hercules Club" ==
"In the year 1877 the late Mr. Henry Stevens of Vermont, under the pseudonym of ' Mr. Secretary Outis,' projected and initiated a literary Association entitled THE HERCULES CLUB. The following extracts from the original prospectus of that year explain this platform:

"The objects of this Association are literary, social, antiquarian, festive and historical; and its aims are thoroughly independent research into the materials of early Anglo-American history and literature. The Association is known as THE HERCULES CLUB, whose Eurystheus is Historic Truth and whose appointed labours are to clear this field for the historian of the future." The founders of the club believed that many valuable historical documents of the Age of Discovery still awaited publication and selected ten topics for which members would contribute research and writings. The ambitious list of topics which they selected for their initial publication were as follows:

1. Waymouth (Capt. George) Voyage to North Virginia in 1605. By James Rosier. London, 1605, 4°
2. Sil. Jourdan's Description of Barmuda. London, 1610, 4°
3. Lochinvar. Encouragements for such as shall have intention to bee Vndertakers in the new plantation of Cape Breton, now New Galloway. Edinburgh, 1625, 4°
4. Voyage into New England in 1623-24.. By Christopher Levett. London, 1628, 4°
5. Capt. John Smith's True Relation of such occurrences of Noate as hath hapned in Virginia. London, 1608, 4°
6. Gosnold's Voyage to the North part of Virginia in 1602. By John Brereton. London, 1602, 4°
7. A Plain Description of the Barmudas, now called Sommer Islands. London, 1613, 4°
8. For the Colony in Virginia Brittania, Lavves Divine Morall and Martiall, &c. London, 1612, 4°
9. Capt. John Smith's Description of NewEngland, 16l4-15, map. London, 1616, 4°
10. Hariot (Thomas) Briefe and true report of the new found land of Virginia. London, 1588, 4°

"The co-operative objects of the Association, however, appear never to have been fully inaugurated, although a large number of literary men, collectors, societies and libraries entered their names as Members of the Club. All were willing to give their pecuniary support as subscribers to the Club's publications, but few offered the more valuable aid of their literary assistance; hence practically the whole of the editing also devolved upon Mr. Henry Stevens.

"He first took up No. 10 on the above list, Hariot's Virginia. His long and diligent study for the introduction thereto, resulted in the discovery of so much new and important matter relative to Hariot and Raleigh, that it became necessary to embody it in a separate volume, as the maximum dimensions contemplated for the introduction to each work had been exceeded tenfold or more."

On Stevens' death in 1886, the completion of the project devolved upon his son Henry N. Stevens who assessed the situation as follows: "Ever since 1886 I have from time to time unsuccessfully endeavoured to enlist the services of various editors competent to complete the projected eleven volumes of the Hercules Club publications, but after a lapse of nearly fourteen years I have awakened to the fact that no actual progress has been made, and that I have secured nothing beyond the vague promise of future assistance." However all was not lost. Mr Stevens (Jr.) found that "On collating the printed stock I found that the two volumes, Hariot's Virginia and the Life of Hariot, were practically complete, the text of both all printed off, and the titles and preliminary leaves and the Index to Hariot's Virginia actually standing in type at the Chiswick Press just as my father left them fourteen years ago!" Thus it was not until 1900, almost 300 years after Hariot's death that the first serious biography appeared.

Even so, the work was not widely distributed, only 162 copies had been printed and one of these deposited in the Harvard College Library. In 1972 the Burt Franklin Press, NYC, issued a reprint edition of the 'Life of Hariot" making it finally available to the literary public. And so 350 years after Hariot's death the true story of his life began slowly to appear. The volume here referred to is titled:

THOMAS HARIOT THE MATHEMATICIAN THE PHILOSOPHER AND THE SCHOLAR
DEVELOPED CHIEFLY FROM DORMANT MATERIALS WITH NOTICES OF HIS ASSOCIATES
INCLUDING BIOGRAPHICAL AND BIBLIOGRAPHICAL DISQUISITIONS UPON THE MATERIALS OF THE
HISTORY OF 'OULD VIRGINIA'

BY HENRY STEVENS OF VERMONT

Stevens consulted the records in the British Museum and found Hariot's will, but did not visit Petworth where the bulk of Hariot's papers were located. Also Stevens was not a mathematician and not equipped to evaluate properly Hariot's mathematical writings including his book on algebra (Artis Analyticae Praxis) which was published posthumously (1631). In fact it is only in 2007 that a full translation into English has been published.
