= Philip Pembroke Stephens =

British journalist (1903–1937)

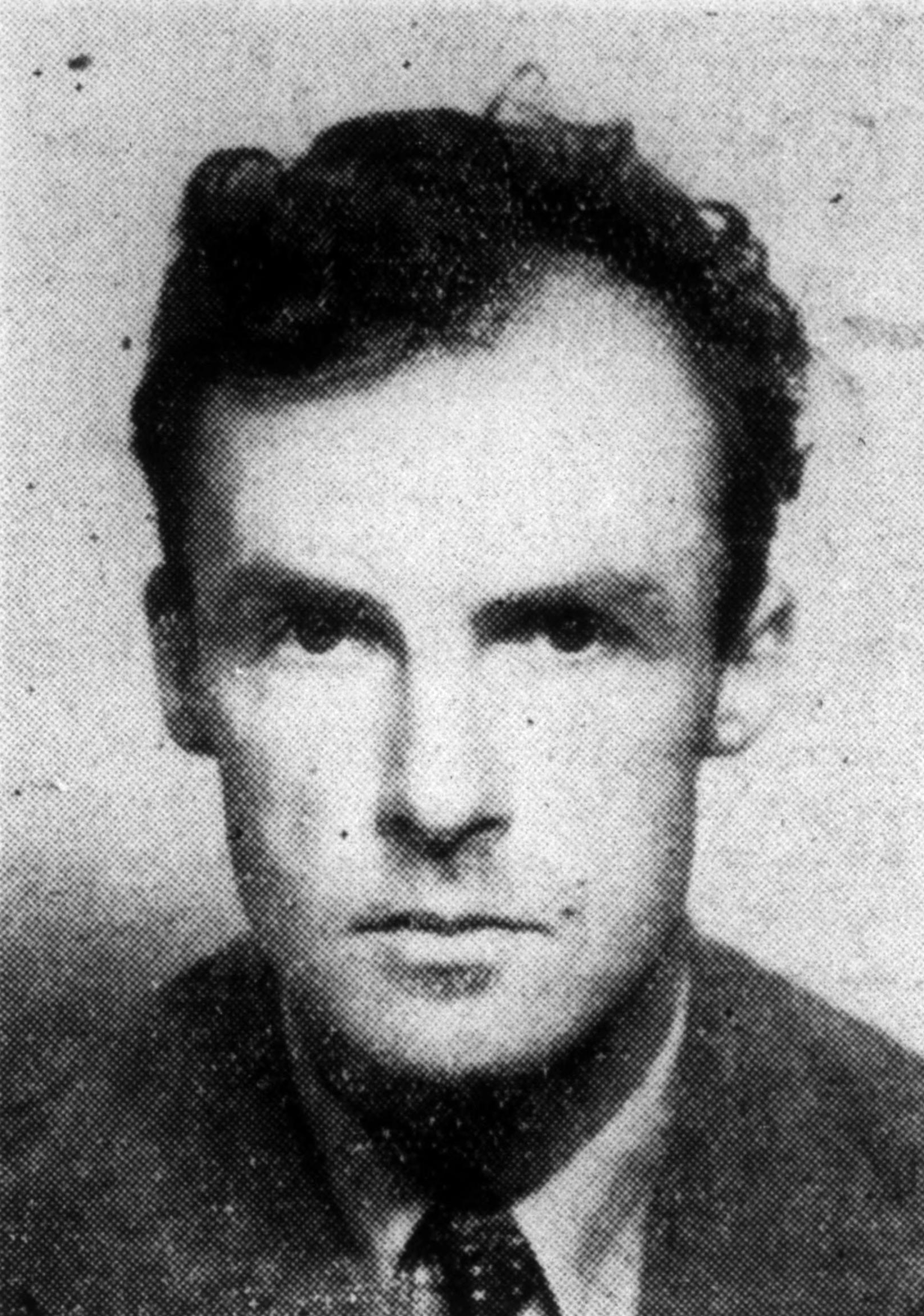
- Born: 1903
- Died: 11/18 November 1937; Shanghai
- Education: Gresham's School, Norfolk; University of Cambridge
- Occupation: Journalist

Philip Pembroke Stephens (1903–1937) was a journalist, foreign correspondent for the Daily Express and the Daily Telegraph. He was expelled from Germany in June 1934 for his critical reporting of Nazism and his campaigning in support of the German Jews. In 1937, reporting from Shanghai on the Japanese invasion of China, he was shot and killed by a Japanese bullet.

== Biography ==
=== Early life ===
Born in 1903, (not 1894 as stated in John Simpson's Unreliable Sources), Stephens was educated at Gresham's School in Norfolk and, later, at the University of Cambridge. He then joined Lincoln's Inn to train to be a barrister, and in 1925 graduated in the second class in Roman-Dutch law. After trying out this and other professions, he settled on journalism.

=== Foreign Correspondent for the Daily Express ===
As a foreign correspondent for the Daily Express, he reported from Vienna and Paris. At the end of 1933, he was sent to Berlin to replace Sefton Delmer. Unlike Delmer, who had tried to get close to Adolf Hitler's close associates to get good stories, Stephens examined the effects of the Nazi regime on ordinary people, especially the Jewish population. His articles, criticizing Nazism and uncovering the harsh conditions of the Jews, became increasingly prominent in the Daily Express. The Nazi authorities arrested him twice, before finally expelling him from Germany in June 1934. From London, he continued to write critical articles on the Nazis, until the Daily Express lost its enthusiasm for this.

=== Death ===
He subsequently joined the Daily Telegraph newspaper and was sent to report on the Second Italo-Abyssinian War, the Spanish Civil War, and the Japanese invasion of China. On 29 April 1937, in the Basque country, he was among the first reporters to enter the ruins of Guernica with the Nationalist forces. In the newspaper, he reported only that the town had been 'burned' but on Sunday 2 May he privately reported to the British Ambassador, Sir Henry Chilton, in Hendaye, that Guernica had been destroyed in an air-raid and these were German and Italian air tactics. He asked the ambassador not to use his name otherwise he would not be permitted to report from Franco's Nationalist headquarters, since their line was the Republicans had set fire to and blown up their own town. In China, he reported for the Daily Telegraph on the atrocities of the invading Japanese. According to John Simpson, he was killed on 18 November 1937, the last day of the Chinese army's stand in Shanghai. John Gittings, however, on his website www.johngittings.com, quotes Five Months of War (Shanghai: North-China Daily News & Herald, 1938), p. 133 as putting Stephens' death on 11 November. Gittings' quotation goes on to describe Stephens as having been shot while watching the fighting from a water tower, when a Japanese machine gunner unexpectedly raised his aim. The Japanese apologized, explaining that they had been shooting at snipers on nearby roof-tops. His chauffeur, Bernhard Arp Sindberg, was with him at the time of his death at the water tower. Bernhard would later save over 6,000 Chinese during the Nanking Massacre. A friend of Stephens', O'Dowd Gallagher from the Daily Mail, wrote the story of Stephens' death and sent it to the Daily Express. (On the other hand, the biographer of Edgar Snow says that O.D. Gallagher was himself working for the Daily Express and sent the story of Stephen's death to the Daily Telegraph.)

== Reporting Style ==
John Simpson, who researched Stephens for his book Unreliable Sources: How the Twentieth Century was Reported, calls Stephens a 'fearless correspondent', who 'stood out for his objective reporting'. He says his journalism was 'arresting, colourful', he 'was a genuine hero of 20th-century reporting', and that he 'refused to do his reporting from the safety of his office. He always preferred to go and see what was happening for himself. It earned him Beaverbrook's highest praise, and a much-increased salary; and in the end it cost him his life.' He 'believed that it was his duty' to report on the plight of the Jews living under Nazi rule.
