= Carly Stevens =

UK academic plant ecologist and geochemist

Carly Joanne Stevens
- Education: Open University, UK
- Scientific career
- Fields: plant ecology; soil biogeochemistry
- Workplaces: Open University, University of Lancaster, UK
- Thesis: Ecosystem properties of acid grasslands along a gradient of nitrogen deposition (2004)

Carly Stevens is a British biogeochemist. She is a professor of plant ecology and soil biogeochemistry at University of Lancaster, UK. Her work focuses on how changes in the atmospheric nitrogen cycle affect plant communities, particularly grasslands.

== Education ==
Carly Joanne Stevens has been awarded B.Sc. and M.Sc. degrees. In 2004, her PhD was awarded by the Open University for her work on the effects of nitrogen on grassland ecology supervised by Nancy Dise, David Gowing and Owen Mountford. It was carried out in collaboration with the NERC Centre for Ecology and Hydrology, Monks Wood. Prior to her appointment at University of Lancaster, Stevens was a research fellow at the Open University.

== Career ==
Stevens' research has contributed to understanding how changes in the levels of nitrogen compounds in the soil, deposited from the atmosphere, have had significant effects on the composition of the UK flora. This has shown that the number of different species of plants present is reduced as soils receive more inorganic nitrogen compounds from the atmosphere. Stevens has been involved with a long-term project at Tadmore Moor that started in 1986 following the effects of nitrogen fertiliser on this wetland. No fertiliser was added after 1990 but she could still find effects in 2005.

Stevens is part of the Nutrient Network, an international collaboration investigating how grasslands are affected by global climate change, specifically how anthropogenic increases in nitrogen and phosphorus levels affect plant productivity and diversity and the interaction of the plants with grazing animals. This research involves the partners setting up the same experiment in their location so that global comparisons can readily be made. It started in 2005 and had grown to 130 sites by 2021.

She is a trustee of the Ecological Continuity Trust that maintains long-term ecological field experiments and their data in the UK.

== Publications ==
Stevens is the author or co-author of over 70 scientific publications and books. These include:

- Carly Stevens, The impact of atmospheric nitrogen deposition on grasslands: species composition and biogeochemistry, VDM Verlag, 2009. ISBN 978-3639144147
- Carly J Stevens, Nancy B Dise, J Owen Mountford, David J Gowing (2004) Impact of nitrogen deposition on the species richness of grasslands. Science 303 1876-1879
