= Joe Stephens (footballer) =

Australian rules footballer

Personal information
- Full name: Joseph Martin Stephens
- Born: 23 July 1887; Queenscliff, Victoria
- Died: 25 November 1935 (aged 48); Melbourne, Victoria
- Original team: Preston

Playing career^{1}
Years	Club	Games (Goals)
1911	St Kilda	8 (2)
- ^{1} Playing statistics correct to the end of 1911.

Joseph Martin Stephens (23 July 1887 – 25 November 1935) was an Australian rules footballer who played with St Kilda in the Victorian Football League (VFL).

== Family ==
The son of Samuel Stephens (1838–1892), and Jane Stephens (1844–1923), née Moyle, Joseph Martin Stephens was born at Queenscliff, Victoria on 23 July 1887.

== Football ==
=== North Melbourne (VFA) ===
He played six senior matches for North Melbourne.

=== Williamstown (VFA) ===
Cleared from North Melbourne, he played one game for Williamstown, against Brunswick on 30 April 1910.

=== Preston (VFA) ===
On 18 May 1910 he was cleared from Williamstown to Preston.

=== St Kilda (VFL) ===
On 28 April 1911 he was cleared from Preston to St Kilda.

He played the first of his eight senior matches, against Geelong, at the Junction Oval on 29 April 1911, and the last, against Collingwood, at Victoria Park on 17 June 1911.

== Death ==
He died (suddenly) in Melbourne on 25 November 1935.
