= Paul Stevens =

Paul Stevens may refer to:

- Paul Stevens (actor) (1921–1986), American actor
- Paul Stevens (Australian footballer) (born 1953), Australian footballer
- Paul Stevens (baseball) (born 1953), American college baseball coach
- Paul Stevens (bobsleigh) (1889–1949), American bobsledder
- Paul Stevens (cricketer) (born 1973), English cricketer
- Paul Stevens (English footballer) (born 1960), English footballer
- Paul Stevens (rugby league), Australian rugby league footballer
- Paul Stevens (Friends), a fictional character
- Paul Schott Stevens (born 1952), American attorney
