= Harvey's Lake (Vermont) =

Lake in Barnet, Vermont, US

Harvey Lake
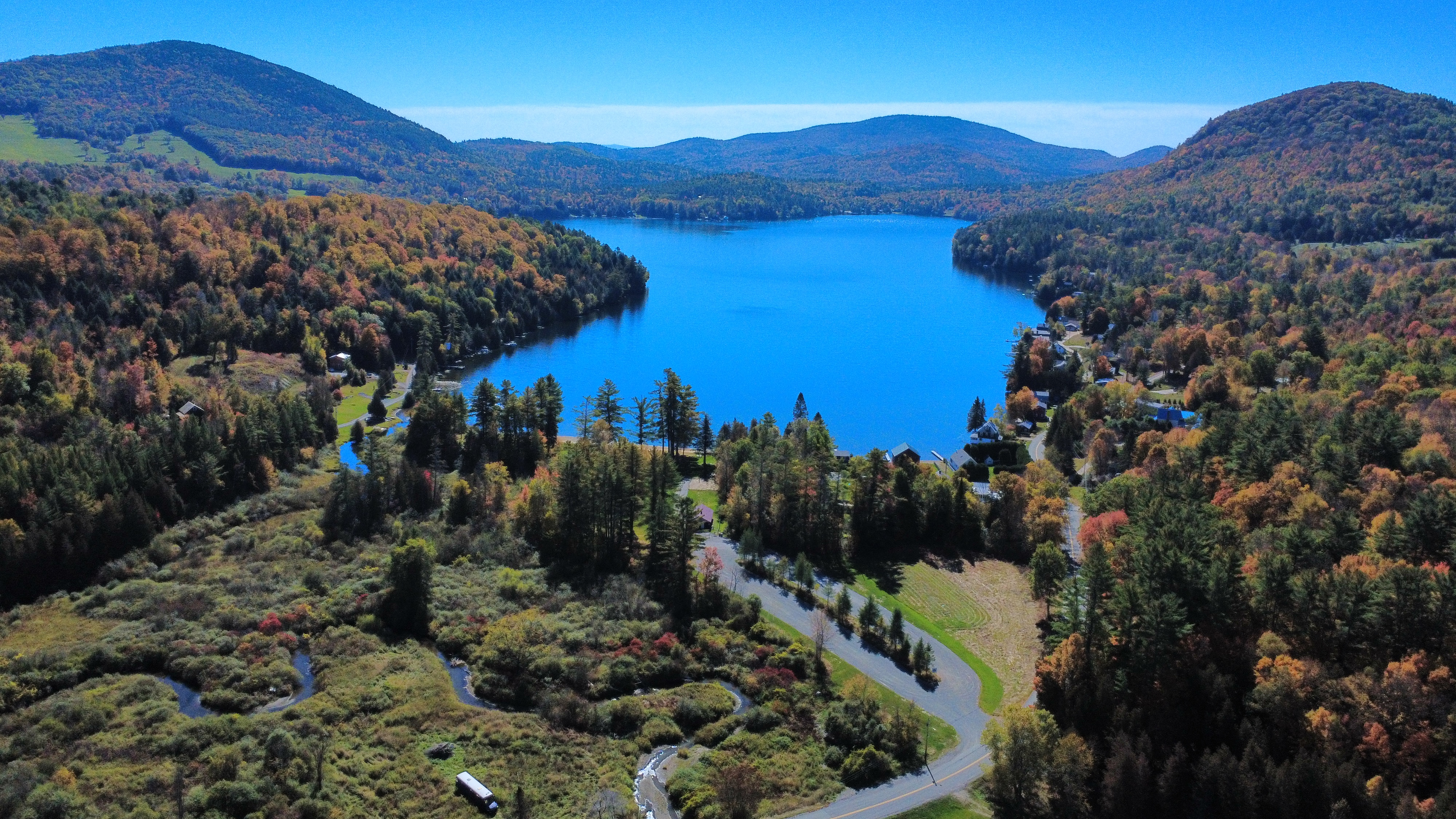
- Harvey's Lake, VT, from the north

- Location within Vermont
- Location: Caledonia County, Vermont
- Coordinates: 44°18′17″N 072°08′27″W
- Basin countries: United States
- Surface area: 0.547 sq mi (1.42 km^{2})
- Max. depth: 144.4 ft (44.0 m)
- Surface elevation: 892 feet (272 m)
- Settlements: Barnet, Vermont

Harvey Lake, locally known as Harvey's Lake, is a lake in the town of Barnet, Vermont in Caledonia County in the northeast section of Vermont, United States. It was named after one of the original settlers of Barnet, Vermont, Colonel Alexander Harvey. Although locally it is known as "Harvey's Lake", it is officially named "Harvey Lake" by the federal Board on Geographic Names, as genitive apostrophes are rarely allowed in the names of natural features.

The lake is in the western part of the town of Barnet, with the village of West Barnet at the northern end of the lake near its outlet. Nearby communities are South Peacham to the northwest and Mosquitoville to the south. The outlet at the northern end of the lake is held back by a dam, owned by the town of Barnet. The northern end of the lake is dominated by Harvey's Lake Park with its public beaches and picnic areas, and by a private campground.

Ocean explorer and SCUBA inventor Jacques Cousteau had influential experiences on Harvey's Lake as a young boy in the early 1920s. While attending a summer camp he experimented with staying underwater by breathing through hollow reeds found in the lake shallows. Though he could not yet swim well, this allowed him to stay underwater for extended periods.
