= Gary Stevens =

Gary Stevens may refer to:

- Gary Stevens (American football) (born 1943), former American football coach
- Gary Stevens (Australian rules footballer) (born 1972), former Sydney Swans player
- Gary Stevens (footballer, born 1954) English footballer, played for Cardiff City and Shrewsbury Town
- Gary Stevens (footballer, born 1962) English footballer, played for Brighton and Tottenham
- Gary Stevens (footballer, born 1963) English footballer, played for Everton and Rangers
- Gary Stevens (jockey) (born 1963), American jockey
- Gary Stevens (politician) (born 1941), Alaska State Senator
- Gary Stevens (radio), American disc jockey in the 1960s for WMCA
- Gary Stevens (rugby league) (1944–2025), Australian rugby league footballer
