= Qixia Temple =

Buddhist Temple in Nanjing, Jiangsu, China

- 栖霞寺
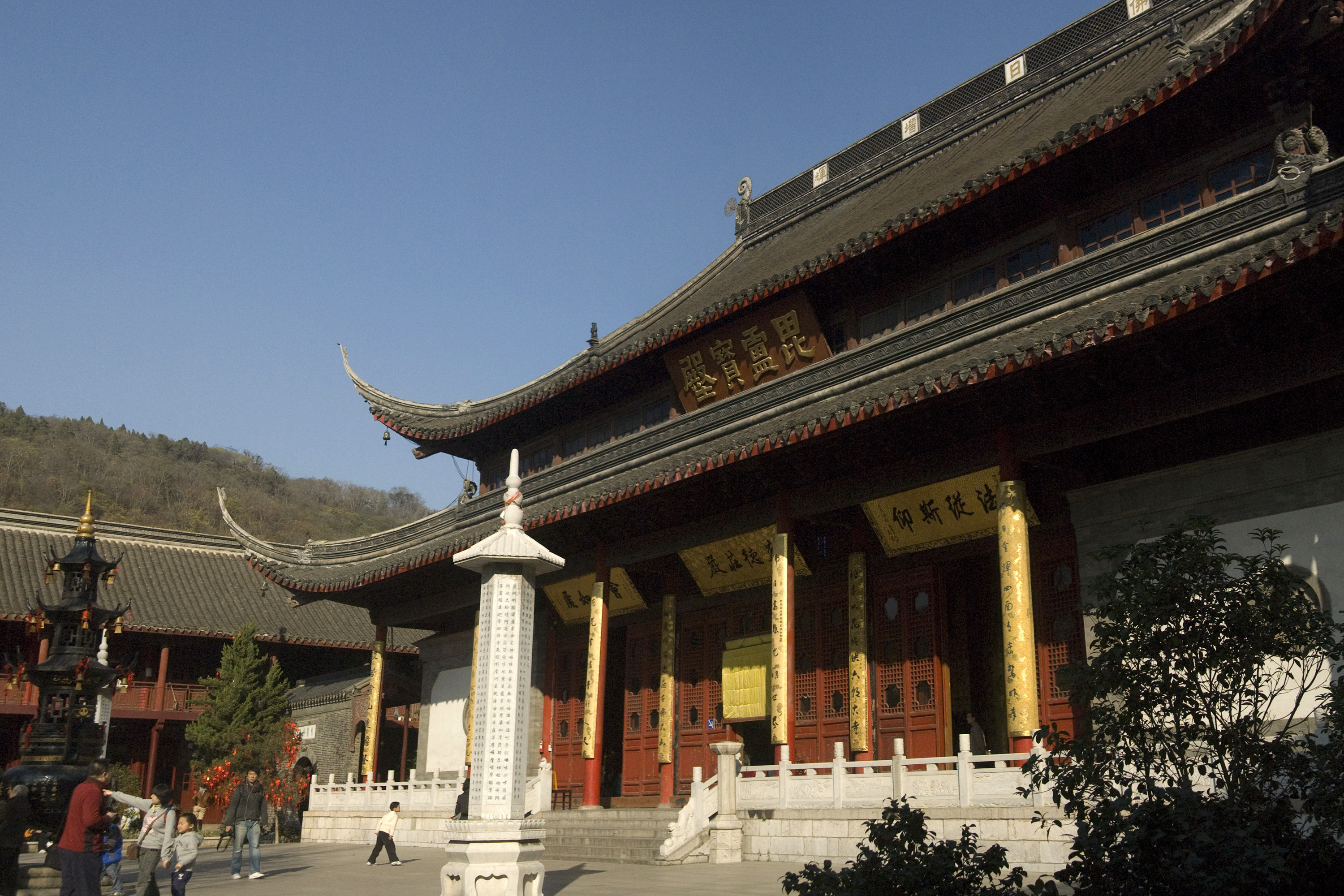
- The Pilu Hall of the temple

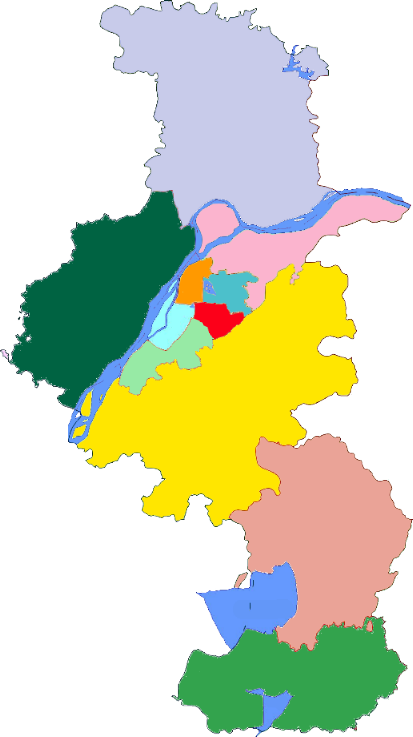
- Location in Nanjing Qixia Temple (Jiangsu)

Religion
- Affiliation: Buddhism
- Sect: East Asian Mādhyamaka

Location
- Location: Qixia District, Nanjing, Jiangsu
- Country: China
- Interactive map of Qixia Temple
- Coordinates: 32°09′15″N 118°57′14″E

Architecture
- Style: Chinese architecture
- Founder: Sengshao (僧绍)
- Established: AD 489
- Completed: 1919 (reconstruction)

Qixia Temple (simplified Chinese: 栖霞寺; traditional Chinese: 棲霞寺; pinyin: Qīxiá Sì) is a Buddhist temple located on Qixia Mountain in the suburban Qixia District of Nanjing, Jiangsu, 22 kilometres (14 mi) northeast of downtown Nanjing. It is one of Nanjing's most important Buddhist monasteries. The temple is the cradle of East Asian Mādhyamaka.

== History ==
Built in AD 489, the 7th year of the Yongming era during the Southern Qi dynasty (479–502), the temple is known for its large collection of Chinese Buddhist visual art and sculptural art in the grounds. These consist of pagodas, murals and artwork that date back to the 10th century.

It has had several names over the centuries, including the "Gongde Temple" (功德寺; Tang dynasty), "Miaoyin Temple" (妙音寺; Southern Tang dynasty), "Puyun Temple" (普云寺; Song dynasty), "Yanyin Chongbao Chan Temple" (严因崇报禅院; Song dynasty), "Jingde Qixia Temple" (景德栖霞寺; Song dynasty) and "Huxue Temple" (虎穴寺; Song dynasty).

In 1372, at the dawn of Ming dynasty (1368–1644), the temple was renamed "Qixia Temple" which is still in use now.

In the late Qing dynasty (1644–1911), Qixia Temple was completely destroyed by the Taiping Rebellion.

The modern restoration of the entire temple complex was carried out in 1919, after the establishment of the Republic of China.

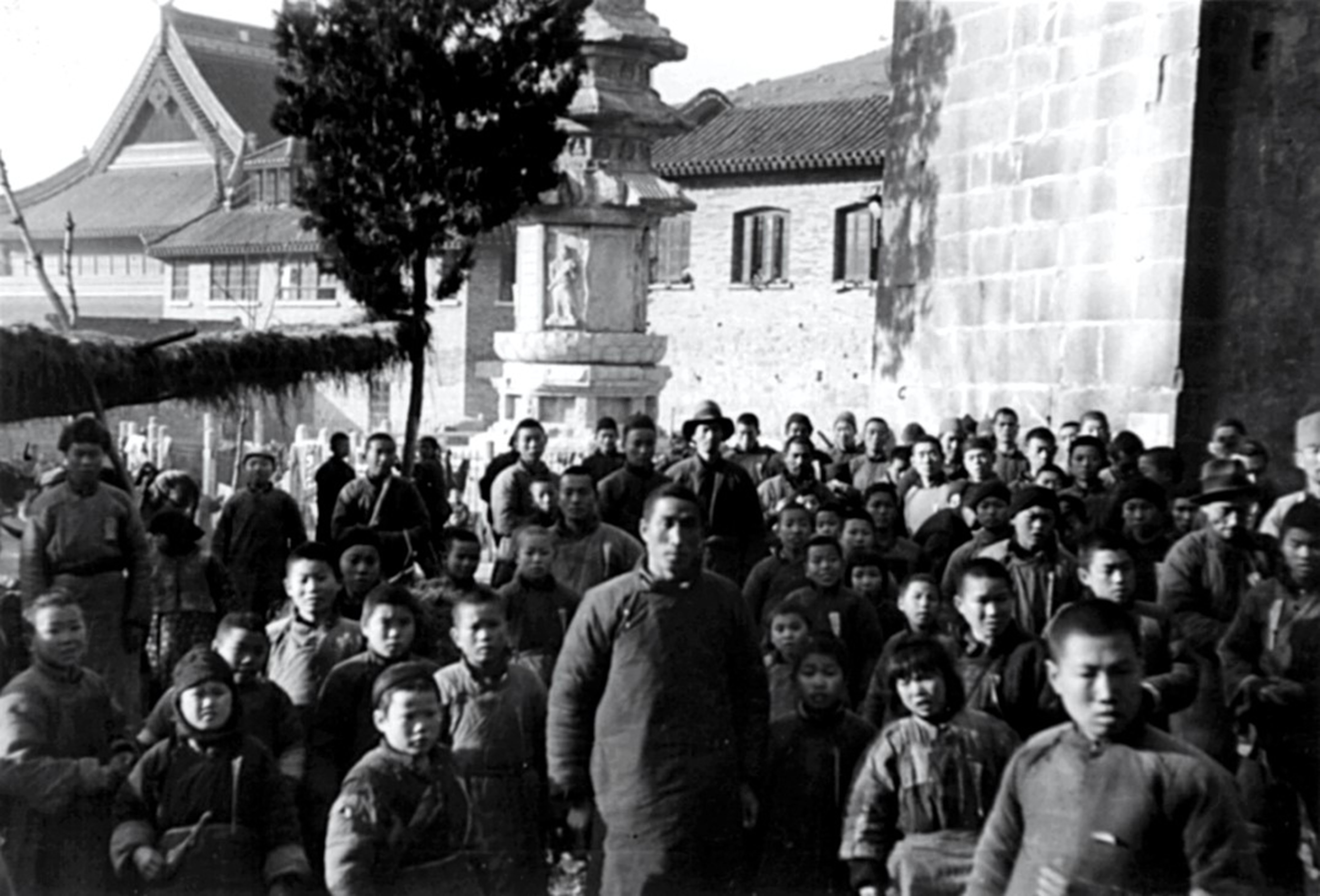
Refugees in the Qixia Temple Refugee Shelter in 1937

In December 1937, when Japanese forces invaded Nanjing, Ji Ran, with the assistance of monks Da Ben and Zhi Kai, opened the temple gates to civilians and soldiers seeking refuge, including Nationalist officer Liao Yaoxiang, whom he concealed in the sutra repository for several days before facilitating his escape through foreign-supported networks. Despite limited resources, Ji Ran allocated 1 million jin (600 metric tons) of temple grain, limiting monks' meals to a single bowl of porridge daily to support refugees. He chronicled the crimes committed by Japanese invaders in petitions, particularly the Appeal to All Humanity (on January 25, 1938), which enumerated mass executions, sexual abuse, and the confiscation of agricultural cattle, subsequently forwarded to John Rabe and preserved in the Rabe Diaries. During the Nanjing Massacre, the temple was a temporary refuge of four months for more than 24,000 civilians fleeing the massacre. The incident was reenacted into a movie Qixia Temple 1937, which helped in boosting visitorship to the temple.

Near the temple site and situated on the slopes of Qixia Hill, is the "Thousand Buddha Caves", a grotto containing many Buddhist sculptural works of art.

== Description ==
=== Qixia Stupa ===
The Qixia Stupa (栖霞塔) or Buddha's Relics Pagoda is in the southeast of Qixia Temple. It was built in 601 and destroyed in the Tang dynasty (618–907). In 945, it was rebuilt by Southern Tang dynasty emperor Li Jing.

The pagoda has a five-story, octagon-shaped structure. It is 18 metres (59 ft) high and perched on a two-story stylobate carved with waves and a dash of fish and Chinese flowering crab apples.

=== Pilu Hall ===
Behind the Mahavira Hall is the Pilu Hall (毗卢殿) enshrining the statues of Piluzhena Fo (Vairocana), Fanten (Brahma) and Dishitian (Śakra). At the back of Piluzhena's statue are statues of Guanyin, Longnü and Shancai (Sudhana). The statues of the Twenty Devas stand on both sides of the hall.

=== Dafo Pavilion ===
The statue of Amituofo (Amitābha) is enshrined in the Dafo Pavilion (大佛阁), meaning the "Pavilion of the Great Buddha". It was built in the 5th century during the Southern Qi dynasty (479–502). The sitting statue is 10.8 metres (35 ft) high and 13.3 metres (44 ft) high adding the throne. Statues of Guanyin (Avalokiteśvara) and Dashizhi (Mahāsthāmaprāpta) stand on the left and right sides of Amituofo's statue. In front of the pavilion there are two statues of Guiding Buddha of the Qixia Stupa, both are more than 3-metre (9.8 ft) high.

=== Thousand Buddha Rock ===
To east side of the Qixia Stupa is the Thousand Buddha Rock (千佛岩), the only Buddhist grottoes of the Southern dynasties (420–589) in China. There are 297 Buddhist niches and 515 statues. In the following dynasties, such as Tang (618–907), Song (960–1279), Yuan (1271–1368) and Ming dynasties (1368–1644), statues were also carved. Totally there are more than 700 statues.

== Alumni ==
=== Hsing Yun ===
Hsing Yun, the founder of Taiwan's Fo Guang Shan, is Qixia Temple's most notable alumnus in the contemporary period. He was tonsured at Qixia Temple in 1941. He was a disciple of Master Zhikai and studied for several years at the Qixia Vinaya School.

== Gallery ==
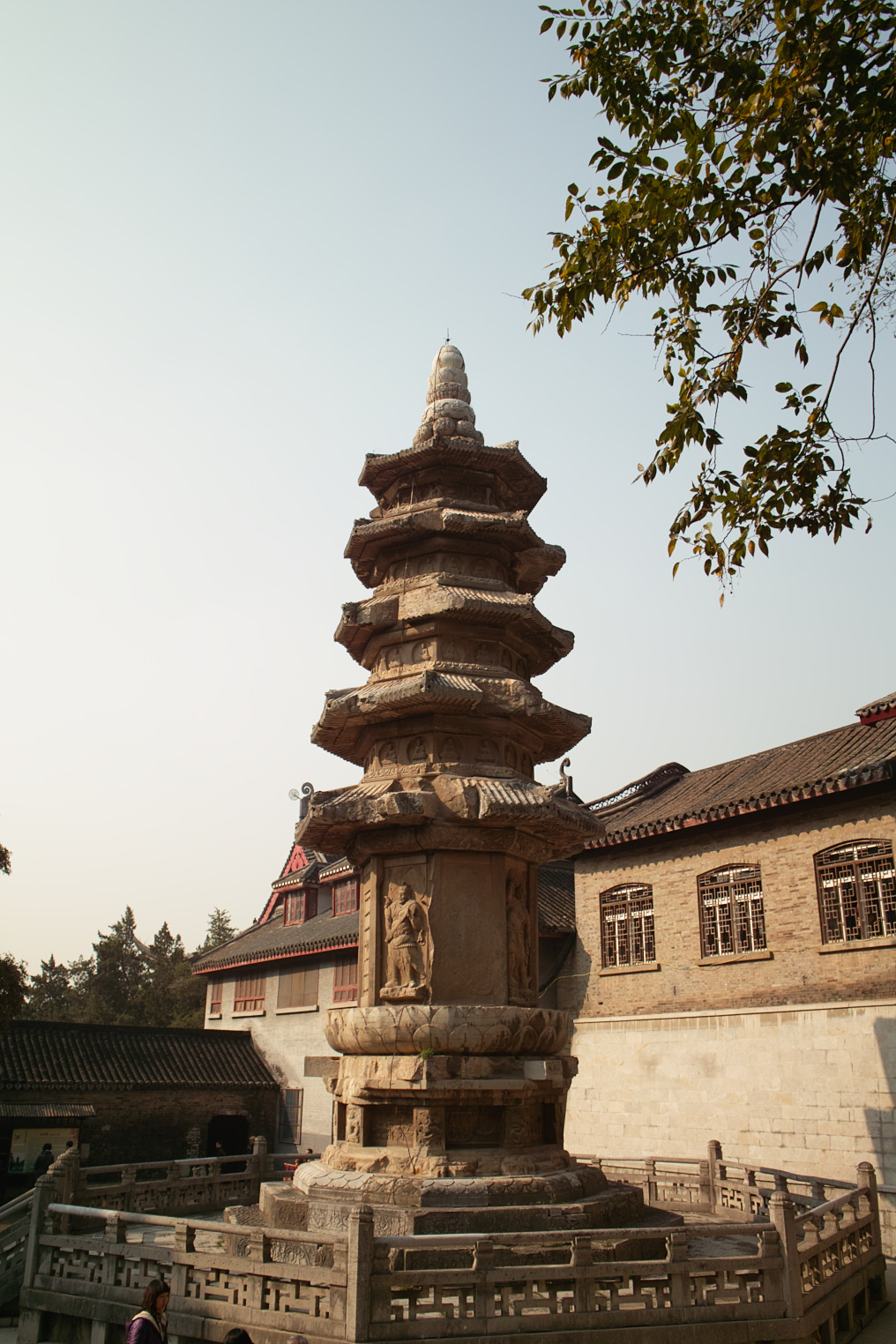
The Qixia Stupa.

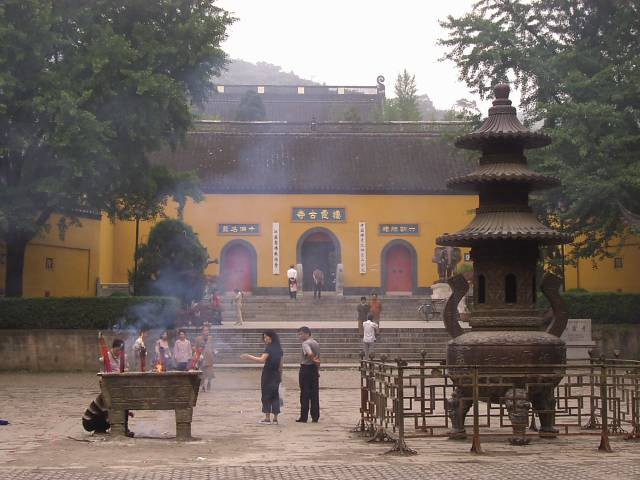
The Shanmen at Qixia Temple.

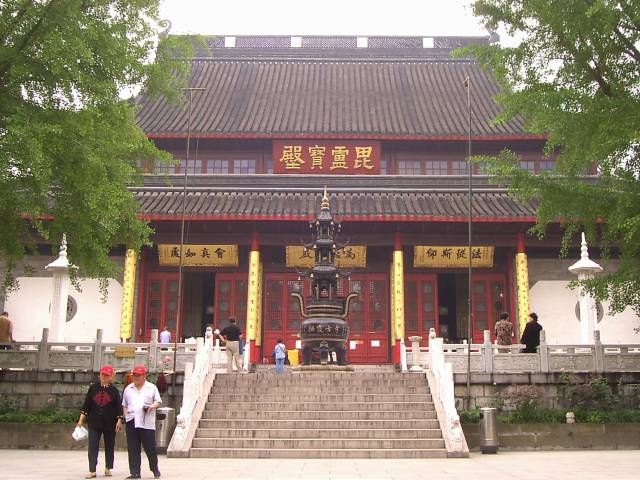
The Pilu Hall at Qixia Temple.

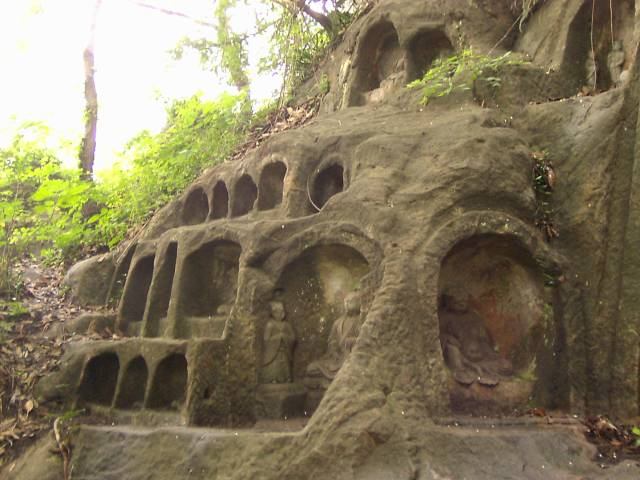
The Thousand Buddha Rock.
