= Les Stevens (footballer) =

English footballer (1920–1991)

Personal information
- Full name: Leslie William George Stevens
- Date of birth: 15 August 1920
- Place of birth: Croydon, England
- Date of death: 1991 (aged 70–71)
- Position: Winger

Youth career
- 1936–1939: Tottenham Hotspur
- 1939: → Northfleet United (loan)

Senior career*
Years	Team	Apps	(Gls)
1940–1949	Tottenham Hotspur	54	(5)
1949–1950	Bradford Park Avenue	44	(4)
1950–1951	Crystal Palace	20	(3)
1951–1952	Tonbridge		
1952–1953	Snowdown Colliery Welfare		
1953–1955	Cambridge United		
1955–1958	Canterbury City		
1958–1959	Ashford Town		
1959	Deal Town		
1959–1960	Croydon Amateurs		
- * Club domestic league appearances and goals

Leslie William George Stevens (15 August 1920 – 1991) was an English professional footballer who played as a winger in the Football League for Tottenham Hotspur, Bradford Park Avenue and Crystal Palace making a total of 118 appearances, scoring 12 goals.

== Playing career ==
Stevens was a junior with Tottenham Hotspur (and also played for their nursery club Northfleet United). Owing to the suspension of competitive football caused by World War II he did not play in the Football League until aged 26: he made his Spurs league debut in the Division Two match on 7 September 1946 against West Bromwich Albion and scored his first League goal on 9 November 1946 against Bury. Stevens played regularly for "The Lilywhites" during the 1946–47 and 1947–48 seasons playing in a total of 52 matches and scoring five goals, however in his third season with "Spurs", 1948–49, he made only two league appearances and departed the club mid-season.

On 26 February 1949 Stevens signed with Bradford Park Avenue for a reported club record fee of £7,000. He played in 12 of Bradford's 14 Division two matches over the remainder of the 1948–49 season notching one goal. During the following 1949–50 season, after which Bradford were relegated, he scored 3 goals in 32 appearances. In August 1950 Stevens left Bradford and was transferred, for a reported £7,000 fee, to Crystal Palace of Division Three South. He remained with Palace for only the 1950–51 season and departed in the summer of 1951 having appeared in 20 matches, netting three goals.

During the close season Stevens moved into non-league football (with Crystal Palace continuing to hold his Football League registration) and joined Southern League club Tonbridge for whom he played during the 1951–52 season. For the next season he signed with Snowdown Colliery Welfare of Division I of the Kent League.

Following two seasons with non-league clubs from Kent, Stevens' next club, for the 1953–54 season, was Cambridge United, a leading club in the Eastern Counties League. He stayed with Cambridge United for two seasons after which Stevens returned to playing in Division I of the Kent League, signing with Canterbury City at the start of the 1955–56 season and remained registered with the club for three seasons (in February 1957 it was reported he had signed for Ramsgate Athletic, however Canterbury City did not agree to his transfer).

In August 1958 Stevens joined Canterbury's league rivals Ashford Town and played with them for one season, 1958–59, before signing with Deal Town who had recently become members of the Aetolian League for the 1959–60 season (following the disbanding of the Kent League). However less than three months into the season, in November 1959, he sought and was granted a permit by the F.A. (relinquishing his professional player status) which allowed him to play in league competitions for Croydon Amateurs of the Surrey Senior League. Stevens scored once in the three games he played for the club during the 1959–60 season and appeared for them in the Surrey Senior League Cup final against Chertsey Town played at Kingstonian, where Croydon (reduced to ten men through an injury to one of their players early in the game) were beaten 2–1. Additionally he coached the club's reserve team during the campaign.
