= Benjamin Franklin Stevens =

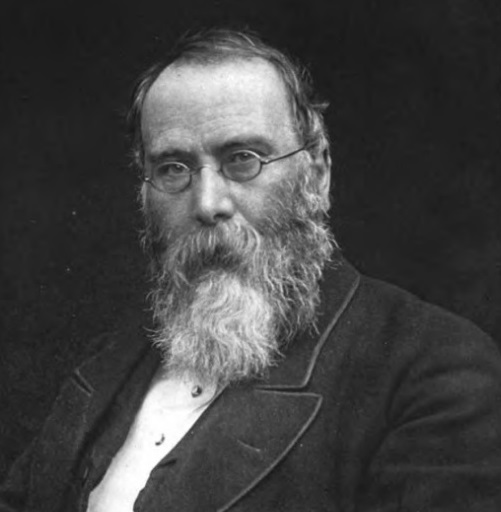
from 1903's Memoir of Benjamin Franklin Stevens

Benjamin Franklin Stevens (February 19, 1833 – March 5, 1902), was a bibliographer and for about thirty years before his death was the US despatch agent at London.

== Biography ==
Benjamin Franklin Stevens like his brother Henry Stevens a bibliographer, was born at Barnet, Vermont, and was educated at the University of Vermont, where he was a member of the Sigma Phi society.

In the 1840s he followed his brother to London in the book export business. He formed his own company with Henry J. Brown in 1864, forming the Literary and Fine Arts Agents, B. F. Stevens & Brown, continued by Ralph A. Brown. For about thirty years he was engaged in preparing a chronological list and alphabetical index of American state papers in English, French, Dutch and Spanish archives, covering the period from 1763 to 1784, and he prepared more than 2000 facsimiles of important American historical manuscripts found in European archives and relating to the period between 1773 and 1783.

Stevens was elected a member of the American Antiquarian Society in 1896.

He also acted as purchasing agent for various American libraries, and for about thirty years before his death was US despatch agent at London and had charge of the mail intended for the vessels of the United States navy serving in Atlantic or European stations. He died at Surbiton, Surbiton, Surrey, England, on the 5 March 1902. He is buried at Kensal Green Cemetery, London.

== Publications ==
His principal publications include:

- Campaign in Virginia, 1781: an Exact Reprint of Six Rare Pamphlets on the Clinton-Cornwallis Controversy, with ... Manuscript Notes by Sir Henry Clinton
- a Supplement containing Extracts from the Journals of the House of Lords (1888)
- Facsimiles of Manuscripts in European Archives Relating to America, 1773–1783, with Descriptions, References and Translations (25 vols, 1889–1898)
- General Sir William Howe's Orderly Book at Charlestown, Boston and Halifax (1890)
- Columbus: His Own Book of Privileges (1893)
- The Manuscripts of the Earl of Dartmouth. Historical Manuscripts Commission. Vol. 2 (Fourteenth Report, Appendix, Part X ed.). London, England: H.M. Stationery Office. 1895.
