= Albert K. Stevens =

American educator (1901–1984)

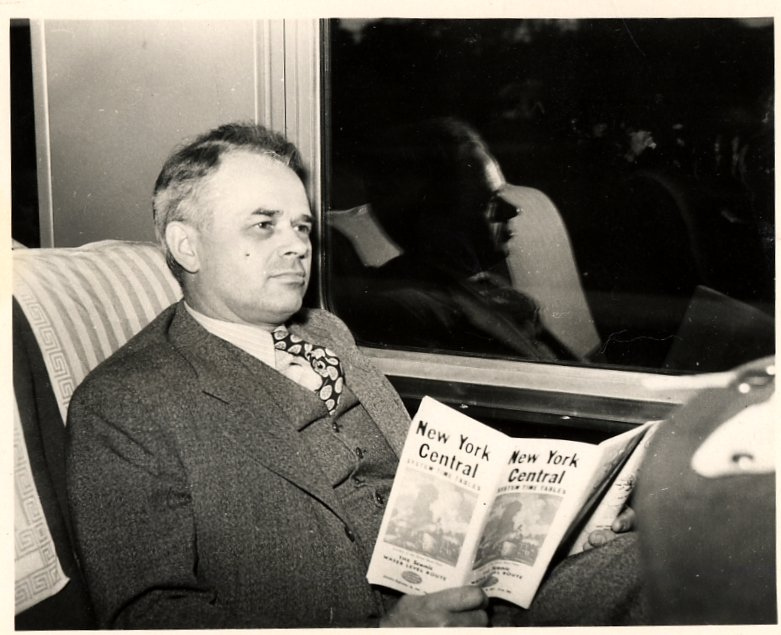
- A.K. Stevens travels by train for the University Extension Service. At this time in 1948, Stevens worked with labor unions around Michigan.
- Born: September 20, 1901; Fremont, Michigan
- Died: September 30, 1984 (aged 83)

Academic background
- Education: Calvin College; University of Michigan

Academic work
- Main interests: English literature, working class movements
- Notable works: Student Cooperative Housing Movement, Michigan Workers Educational Service

Albert K. Stevens (September 20, 1901 – September 30, 1984) (also known as A.K. Stevens) was a scholar, professor, and early supporter of the student cooperative housing movement in Ann Arbor, Michigan, in the 1930s.

== Early life ==
Stevens was born and raised in a Dutch Calvinist community near Fremont, Michigan, the son of William and Grace Kunnen Stevens. He studied English literature at Calvin College and was awarded a bachelor's degree in 1924. He came to the University of Michigan in Ann Arbor, Michigan, in 1925 and received his master's degree in 1926.

== Career ==
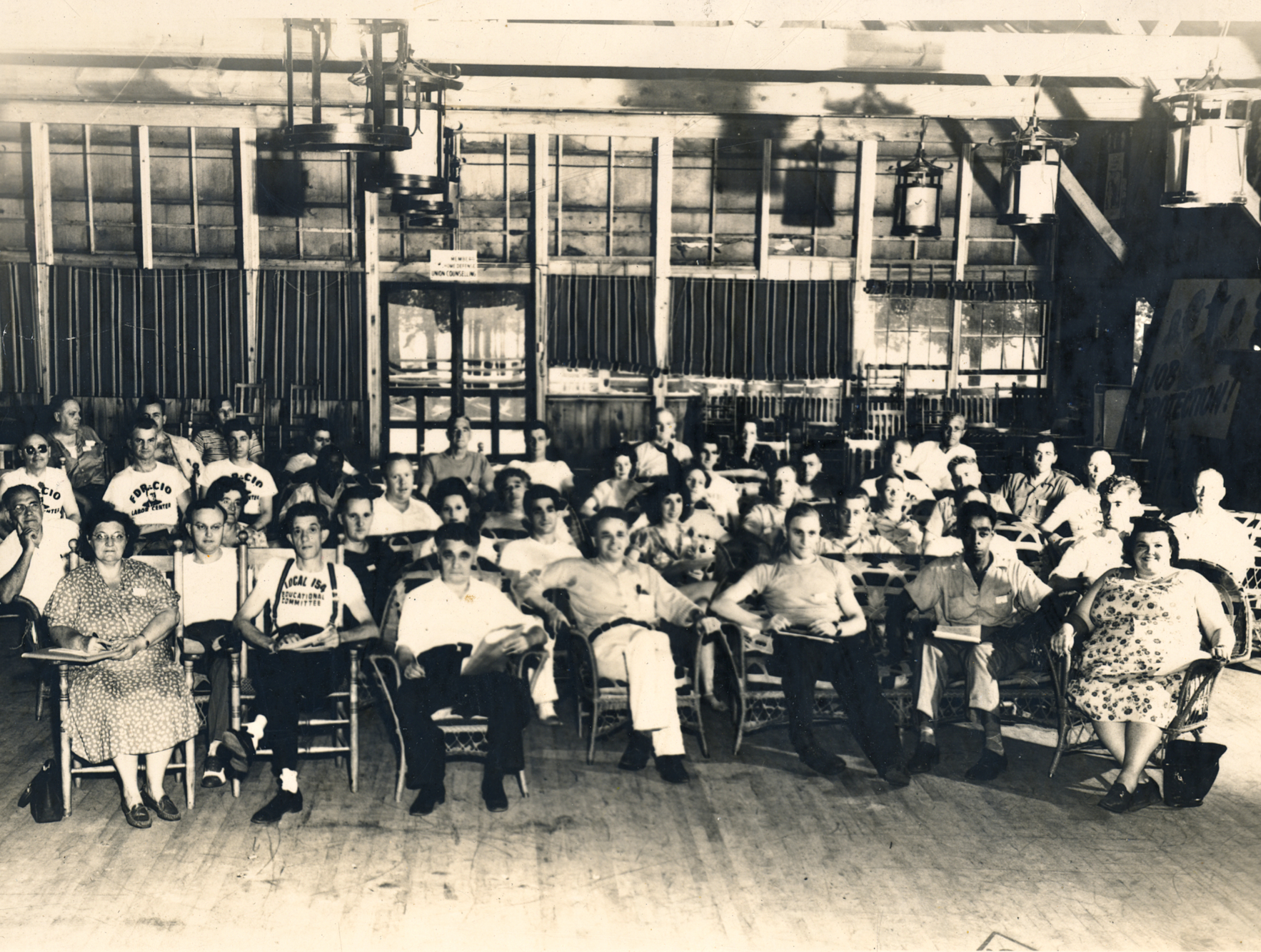
Labor-union Conference held at Port Huron, Michigan, 1946. Professor AK Stevens is at center, front.

Stevens served on the faculty of the University of Michigan from 1927 as an instructor until his retirement as professor of English language and literature in 1972. He served on the faculty in the College of Literature, Science and the Arts, and of the Teaching of English in the School of Education. His field of work included working class movements, including Chartism. Stevens was a founder of, and faculty advisor to, the University of Michigan Inter-Cooperative Council (ICC), an innovative initiative, now greatly expanded, fostering student-owned housing organized on the Rochdale Principles of cooperation. In 1944, he co-signed the loan to purchase the first ICC co-op house for University of Michigan students, which was named in his honor, the A. K. Stevens Cooperative House. The house, which stood on Forest Avenue south of Hill Street in Ann Arbor, was destroyed on May 25, 2004, by a fire.

During the 1930s and 1940s, Stevens was instrumental in a University of Michigan Department of English effort to link newly improved curricula and the preparation of pupils in Michigan high schools who wished to concentrate in these programs. The program included accreditation visits from the Bureau of School Services, offering of extension courses to teachers, and coordination with teachers’ associations.

Also during the 1940s, Stevens was program supervisor of the Workers Educational Service, an experimental program for adults subsidized by the State of Michigan. The program's purpose was to serve persons who had received little educational training, but who wished to become informed about economics, social philosophies, collective bargaining, labor relations, and similar topics, and who were eager to improve their skills in public speaking and debate, the managing of meetings, and union organization. He also served as editor of the newsletter of the Michigan Council of Teachers of English, for which he became the first executive secretary.

Completing his academic studies, in 1950 he received his PhD and in 1954 became an associate professor. He was promoted to professor in 1962. Stevens employed the Bible as a critical educational tool, discussing its literary, social, historical, and religious aspects to reach students with widely differing cultural backgrounds, beliefs, and degrees of sophistication.

== Personal life ==
Stevens was married to Angelyn (Annagien Bouwsma) Stevens on June 19, 1925, after they met at Calvin College. Angelyn continued to study philosophy at the University of Michigan after having taken all the philosophy courses Calvin College had to offer, and convinced A.K. to come to Ann Arbor to experience a more engaging intellectual environment, a move that led to A.K.'s academic career at the university. Angelyn became a graduate student in philosophy at Michigan during Professor Stevens' early years in the university's English Department. The couple started a lifetime friendship with the Anglo-American poet W. H. Auden when he was a visiting instructor at the university in the early 1940s. Auden dedicated the poem "Mundus Et Infans" to the couple. When Auden became a U.S. citizen, Stevens was his sponsor.

Stevens and his wife died together in an automobile accident in September 1984. They were survived by five children: F. Bradley Stevens, Grace TerMaat, Mary Hathaway, Wystan Auden Stevens and Eve Heidtmann, and fourteen grandchildren.
