= Galway =

City in Connacht, Ireland

Galway Gaillimh (Irish)
- City
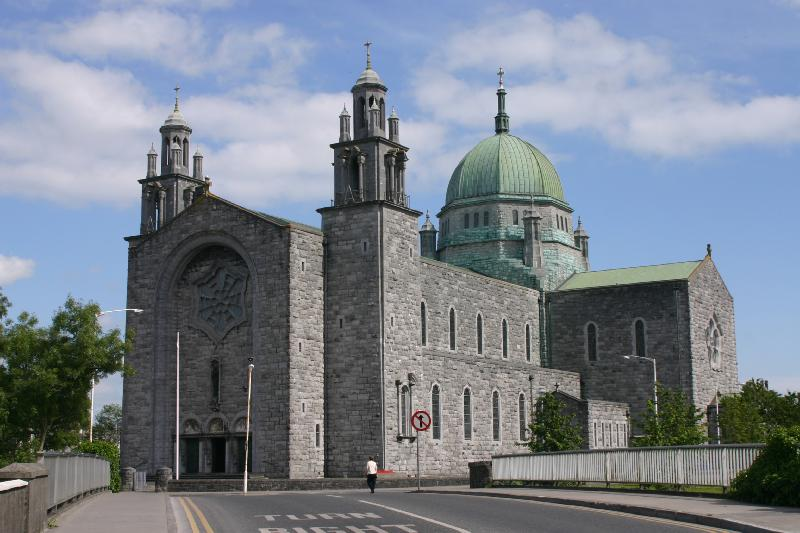
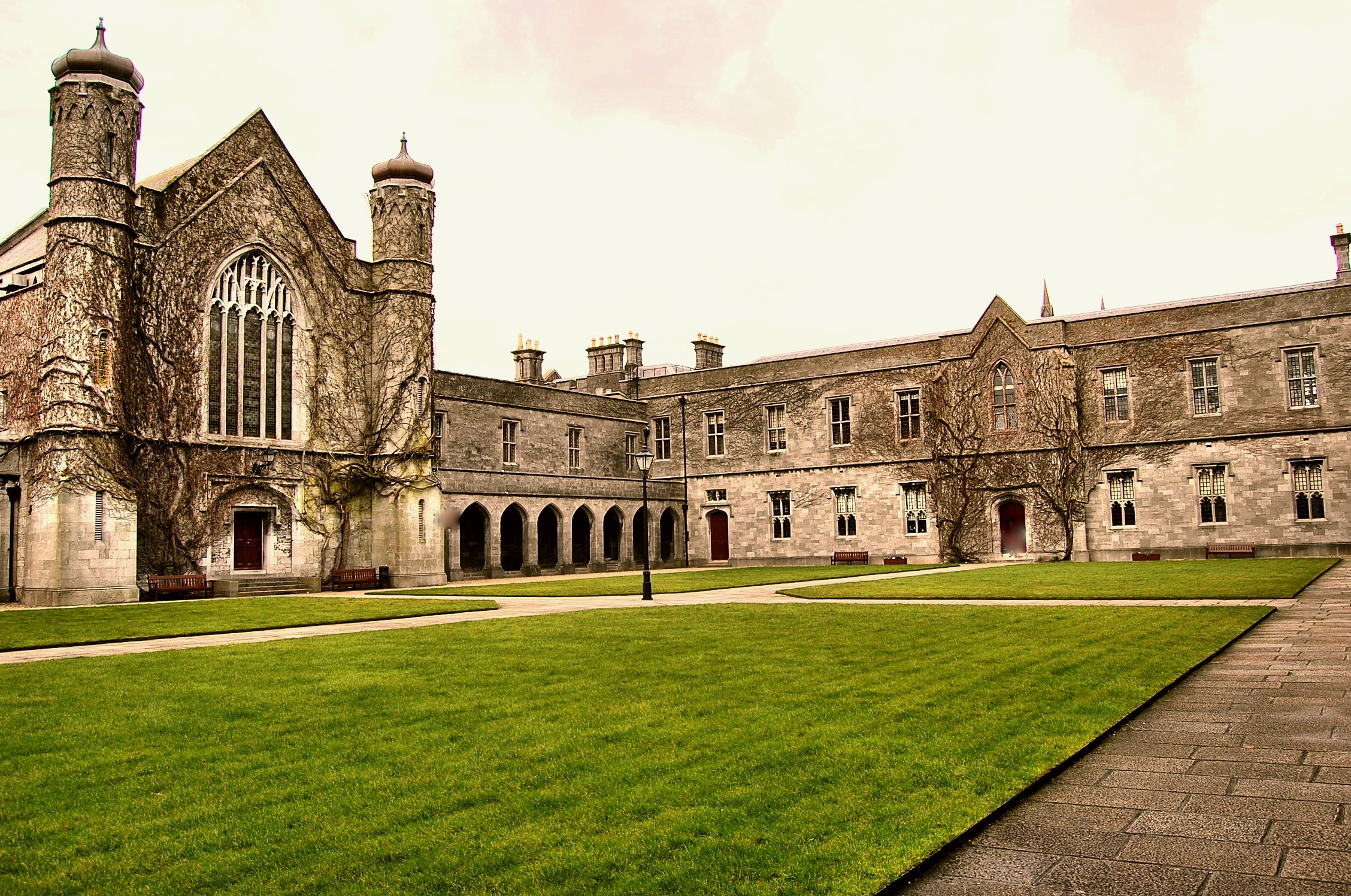
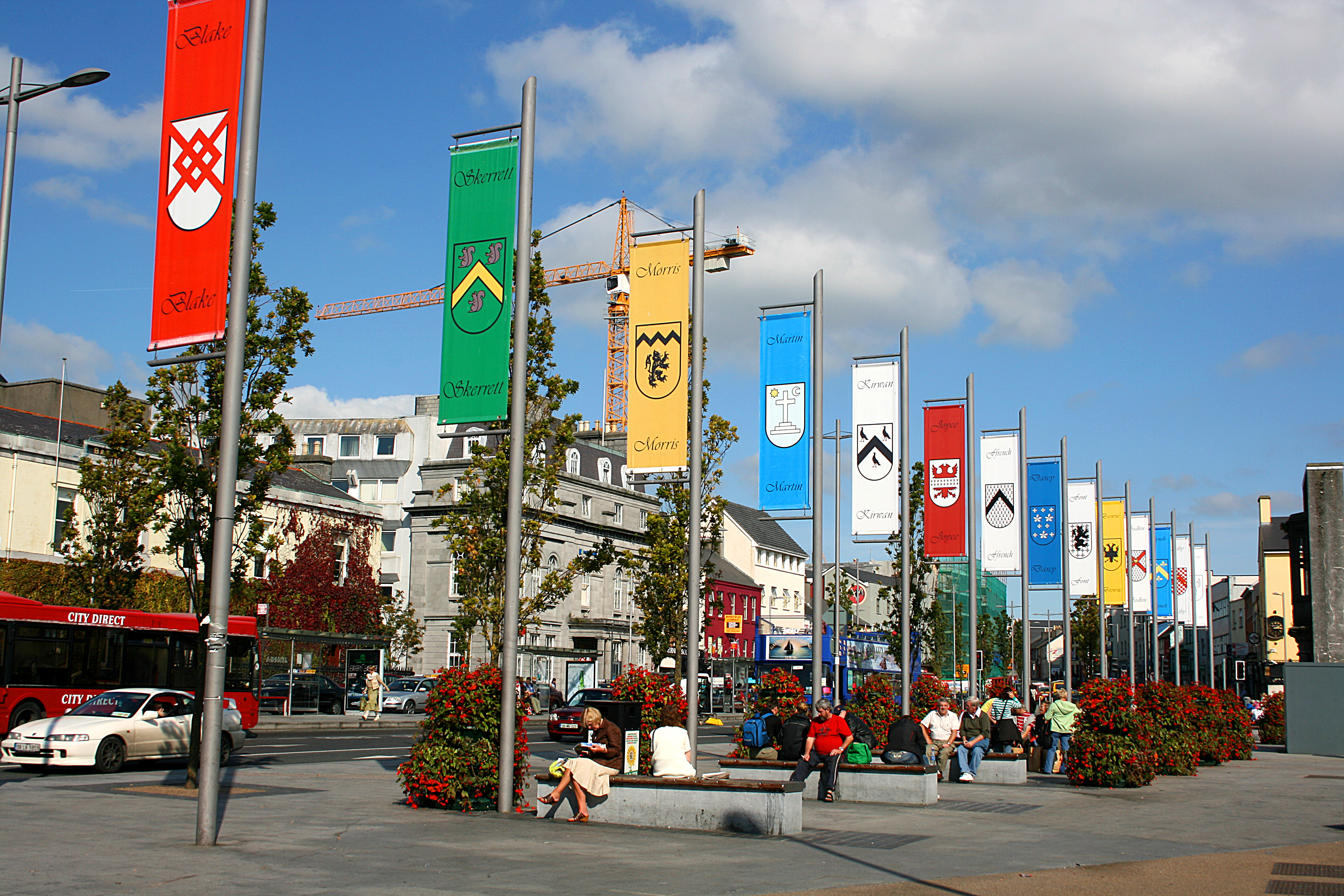
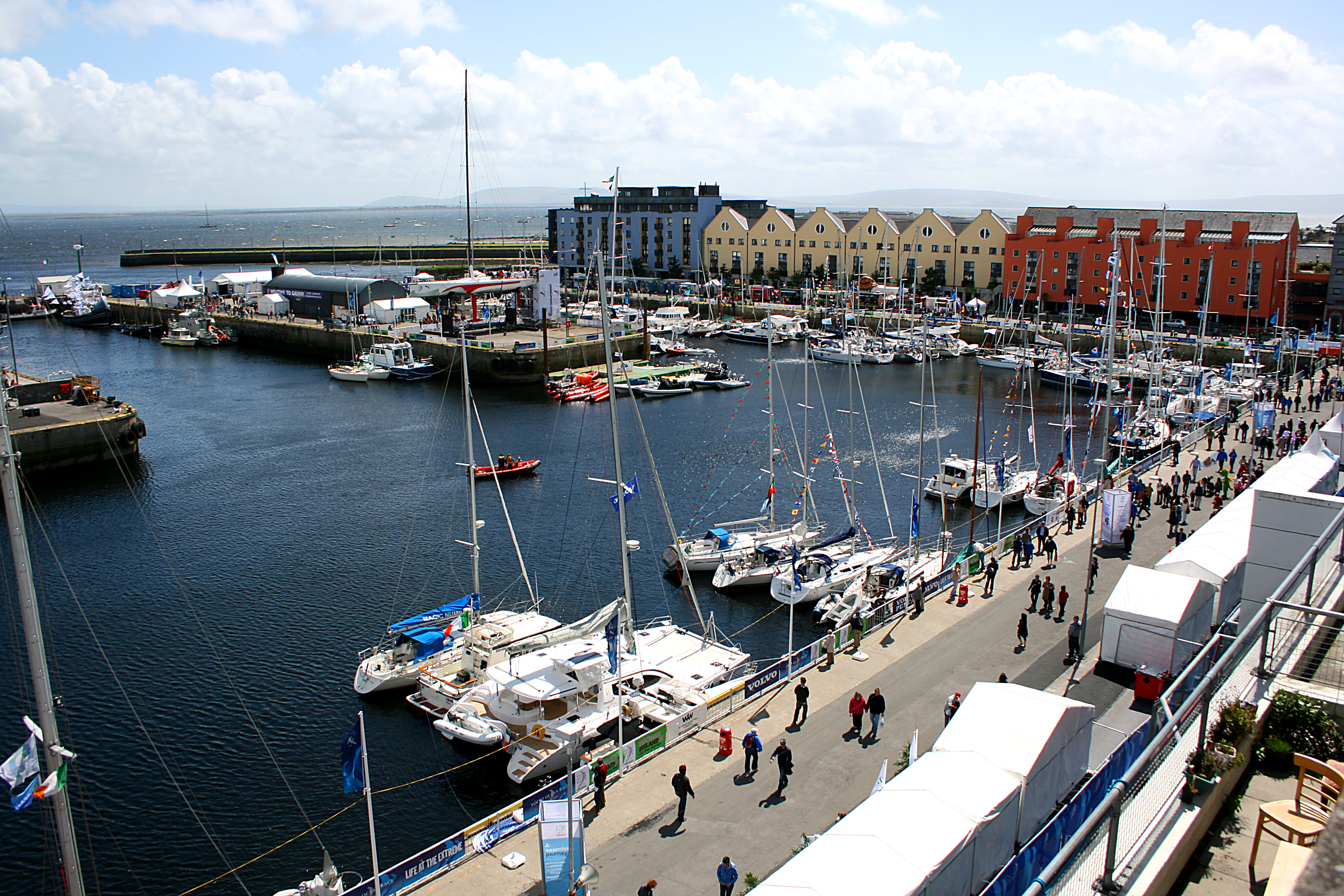
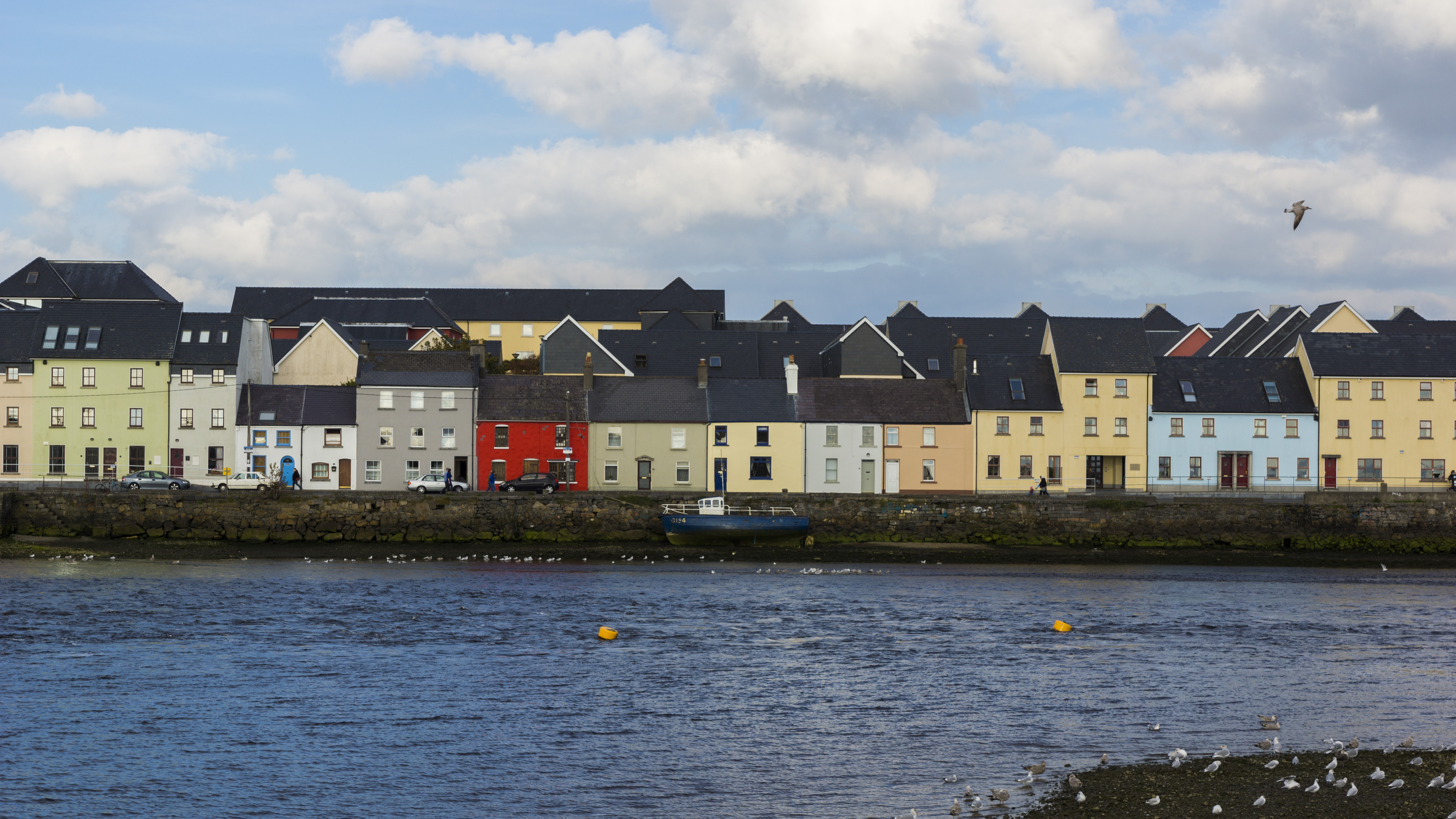
- Galway Cathedral University of Galway Eyre Square Port of Galway The Long Walk on Claddagh Quay

- Coat of arms
- Nickname: "City of the Tribes"
- Motto(s): Laudatio Ejus Manet In Secula Seculorum (Latin) "His Praise Remains unto Ages of Ages"
- Interactive map of Galway
- Location within Ireland Location within Europe
- Coordinates: 53°16′19″N 9°2′56″W
- Country: Ireland
- Province: Connacht
- Region: Northern and Western (West)
- County: Galway
- Founded: 1124 AD
- City Rights: 1484 & 1985 AD

Government
  - Local Authority: Galway City Council
  - Mayor: Helen Ogbu (Labour)
  - Local electoral areas: Galway City Central; Galway City East; Galway City West
  - Dáil Éireann: Galway West
  - European Parliament: Midlands–North-West

Area
  - Total: 57.3 km^{2} (22.1 sq mi)
- Elevation: 25 m (82 ft)

Population (2022)
  - Total: 85,910
  - Rank: 4th
  - Density: 1,500/km^{2} (3,880/sq mi)
- Demonyms: Galwegian, Tribesman
- Time zone: UTC0 (WET)
  - Summer (DST): UTC+1 (IST)
- Eircode (Routing Key): H91
- Area code: 091(+353 91)
- Vehicle Index Mark Code: G
- Website: Official website

Galway (/ˈɡɔːlweɪ/ GAWL-way; Irish: Gaillimh, pronounced [ˈɡal̠ʲɪvʲ]) is a city in (and the county town of) County Galway. It lies on the River Corrib between Lough Corrib and Galway Bay. It is the most populous settlement in the province of Connacht, the fifth most populous city on the island of Ireland and the fourth most populous in the Republic of Ireland, with a population of 85,910 at the 2022 census.

Located near an earlier settlement, Galway grew around a fortification built by the King of Connacht, Tairrdelbach Ua Conchobair in 1124. A municipal charter in 1484 allowed citizens of the by then walled city to form a council and mayoralty. Controlled largely by a group of merchant families, the Tribes of Galway, the city grew into a trading port. Following a period of decline, as of the 21st century, Galway is a tourist destination known for festivals and events including the Galway International Arts Festival.

In 2018, Galway was named the European Region of Gastronomy. The city was the European Capital of Culture for 2020, alongside Rijeka, Croatia.

== Name ==
The city's name comes from the Irish name Gaillimh, a river which formed the western boundary of the earliest settlement, Dún Gaillimhe "Fort Gaillimh". (Mythical and alternative derivations of the name are given in History of Galway). Historically, the name was anglicised as Galliv or Gallive, closer to the Irish pronunciation. The city's name in Latin is Galvia. Residents of the city are referred to as Galwegians.

The city also bears the nickname "City of the Tribes" (Irish: Cathair na dTreabh) because of the fourteen merchant families called the "tribes of Galway" who led the city in its Hiberno-Norman period.

== History ==
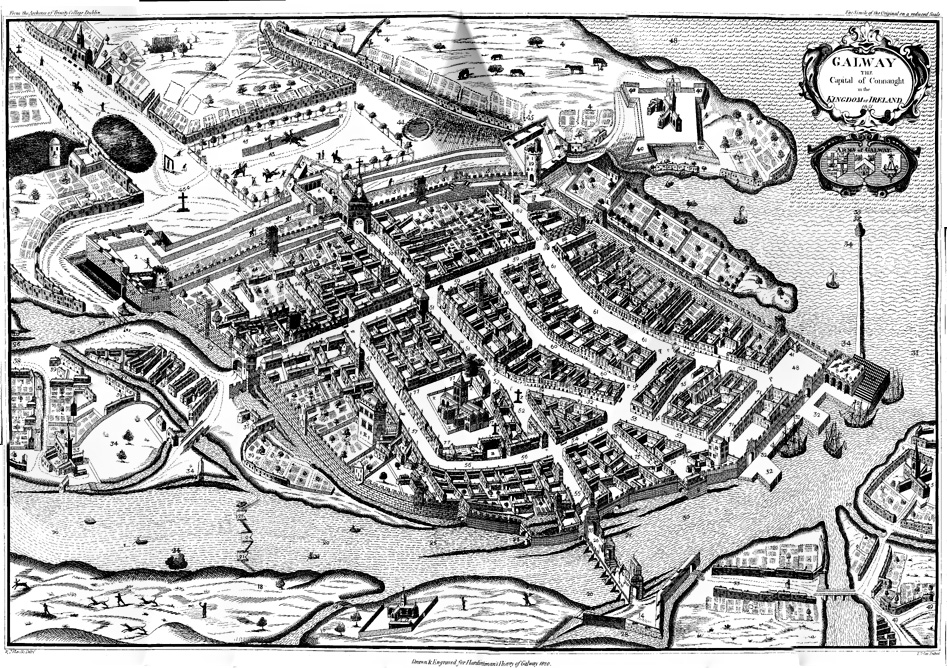
The walled city in 1651 (North is to the left). The River Corrib is in the foreground, crossed by what is now "O'Briens Bridge", leading to Mainguard Street.

Built on the site of an earlier settlement, Dún Gaillimhe ("Fort at the Mouth (bottom) of the Gaillimh") was completed in 1124, by the King of Connacht and High King of Ireland Tairrdelbach Ua Conchobair (1088–1156). The castle served as a naval base from which his fleet operated. A new settlement grew around it. During the Norman invasion of Connacht in the 1230s, Dún Gaillimhe was captured by Richard Mor de Burgh, who had led the invasion. As the de Burghs eventually became Gaelicised, the merchants of the town, the Tribes of Galway, pushed for greater control over the walled city.

Historical population
Year	Pop.	±%
1813	24,684	—
1821	27,775	+12.5%
1831	33,120	+19.2%
1841	17,275	−47.8%
1851	20,055	+16.1%
1861	16,048	−20.0%
1871	15,597	−2.8%
1881	15,471	−0.8%
1891	13,800	−10.8%
1901	13,426	−2.7%
1911	13,255	−1.3%
1926	14,227	+7.3%
1936	18,294	+28.6%
1946	20,370	+11.3%
1951	21,316	+4.6%
1956	21,366	+0.2%
1961	23,700	+10.9%
1966	26,295	+10.9%
1971	29,375	+11.7%
1981	41,861	+42.5%
1986	47,104	+12.5%
1991	50,853	+8.0%
1996	57,363	+12.8%
2002	66,163	+15.3%
2006	72,729	+9.9%
2011	75,529	+3.8%
2016	79,934	+5.8%
2022	85,910	+7.5%

This led to their gaining complete control over the city and to the granting of mayoral status by the English crown in December 1484. Galway endured difficult relations with its Irish neighbours. A notice over the west gate of the city, completed in 1562 by Mayor Thomas Óge Martyn, stated "From the Ferocious O'Flahertys may God protect us". A by-law forbade the native Irish (as opposed to Galway's Hiberno-Norman citizens) unrestricted access into Galway, saying "That neither O, ne Mac, shoulde strutte ne swagger, throughe the streetes of Gallway" without permission.

During the Middle Ages, Galway was ruled by an oligarchy of fourteen merchant families (twelve who claimed to be of Norman origin and two of Irish origin). These were the "Tribes of Galway". The city thrived on international trade, and in the Middle Ages, it was the principal Irish port for trade with Spain and France. The most famous reminder of those days is ceann an bhalla ("the end of the wall"), now known as the Spanish Arch, constructed during the mayoralty of Wylliam Martin (1519–20). In 1477 Christopher Columbus visited Galway, possibly stopping off on a voyage to Iceland or the Faroe Islands. Seven or eight years later, he noted in the margin of his copy of Imago Mundi:

Men of Cathay have come from the west. [Of this] we have seen many signs. And especially in Galway in Ireland, a man and a woman, of extraordinary appearance, have come to land on two tree trunks [or timbers? or a boat made of such?]

The most likely explanation for these bodies is that they were Inuit swept eastward by the North Atlantic Current.

During the 16th and 17th centuries, Galway remained loyal to the English crown for the most part, even during the Gaelic resurgence, perhaps for reasons of survival. However, by 1642 the city had allied itself with the Catholic Confederation of Kilkenny during the Wars of the Three Kingdoms. During the resulting Cromwellian conquest of Ireland, Cromwellian forces captured the city after a nine-month siege. At the end of the 17th century, the city supported the Jacobites in the Williamite war in Ireland and was captured by the Williamites after a very short siege not long after the Battle of Aughrim in 1691. The great families of Galway were ruined. The city later suffered further under the Great Famine of 1845–1852.

== Geography ==
=== Climate ===
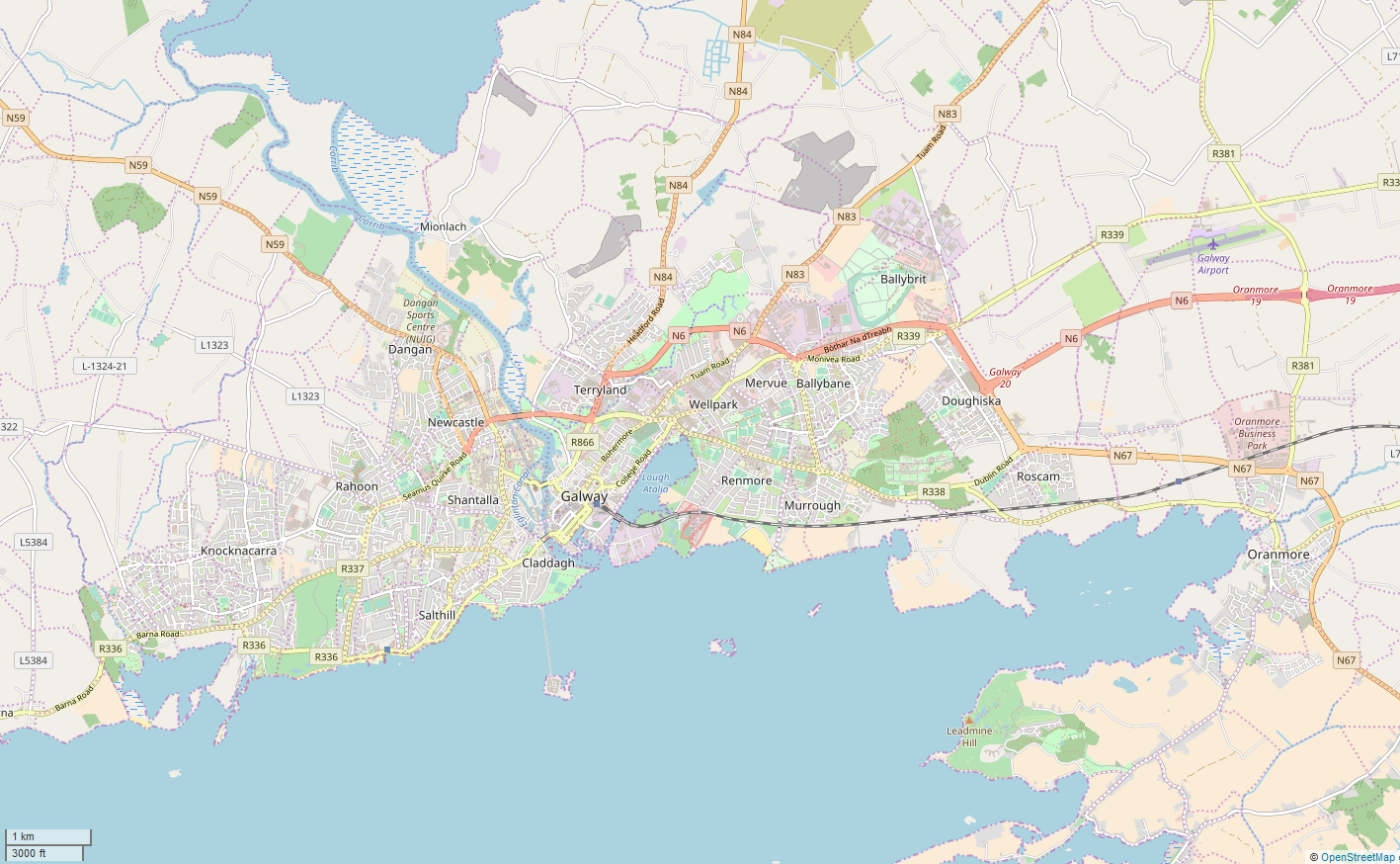
Map of Galway

Like most of Ireland, Galway has an oceanic climate (Cfb) according to the Köppen climate classification, being one of the world's mildest cities for its latitude, partly because it is on an island. Galway has a year-round mild, moist, temperate and changeable climate, due to the prevailing winds of the North Atlantic Current together with the Gulf Stream, whilst on the other side of the Atlantic temperatures can be 20 °C cooler or more. The city does not experience temperature extremes, with temperatures below 0 °C (32 °F) and above 30 °C (86 °F) being rare. The city receives an average of 1,156 mm (45.51 in) of precipitation annually, which is evenly distributed throughout the year. The average January temperature in the city is 5.9 °C (43 °F) and the average July temperature is 15.9 °C (61 °F). The highest temperature ever recorded in Galway was 31.7 °C (89.1 °F) in July 1921, whilst the lowest temperature recorded was −11.7 °C (10.9 °F) in January 1945.

While extreme weather is rare, the city and county can experience severe windstorms that are the result of vigorous Atlantic depressions that occasionally pass along the north west coast of Ireland. Most of these storms occur between late autumn and early spring. Due to the city's northerly location, Galway has long summer days. Sunrise on summer solstice occurs at 05:07 WEST and sunset at 22:07. By contrast, on winter solstice, the sun rises at 08:49 WET, and sets at 16:19.

Climate data for Galway, elevation: 8 m or 26 ft, 1981–2010 normals, extremes 1861–2002
Month	Jan	Feb	Mar	Apr	May	Jun	Jul	Aug	Sep	Oct	Nov	Dec	Year
Record high °C (°F)	14.4 (57.9)	15.7 (60.3)	21.1 (70.0)	23.3 (73.9)	26.7 (80.1)	30.6 (87.1)	31.7 (89.1)	30.6 (87.1)	28.3 (82.9)	25.6 (78.1)	18.3 (64.9)	16.7 (62.1)	31.7 (89.1)
Mean daily maximum °C (°F)	8.7 (47.7)	9.1 (48.4)	10.8 (51.4)	13.0 (55.4)	15.8 (60.4)	17.8 (64.0)	19.5 (67.1)	19.1 (66.4)	17.3 (63.1)	14.1 (57.4)	11.0 (51.8)	9.0 (48.2)	13.8 (56.8)
Daily mean °C (°F)	6.0 (42.8)	6.2 (43.2)	7.8 (46.0)	9.3 (48.7)	11.9 (53.4)	14.2 (57.6)	16.1 (61.0)	15.8 (60.4)	13.9 (57.0)	11.0 (51.8)	8.1 (46.6)	6.3 (43.3)	10.6 (51.1)
Mean daily minimum °C (°F)	3.5 (38.3)	3.8 (38.8)	4.9 (40.8)	5.8 (42.4)	8.0 (46.4)	10.6 (51.1)	12.9 (55.2)	12.5 (54.5)	10.4 (50.7)	7.9 (46.2)	5.1 (41.2)	3.6 (38.5)	7.3 (45.1)
Record low °C (°F)	−11.7 (10.9)	−10.5 (13.1)	−6.7 (19.9)	−6.7 (19.9)	−1.5 (29.3)	−2.2 (28.0)	3.3 (37.9)	1.7 (35.1)	0.6 (33.1)	−5.0 (23.0)	−6.7 (19.9)	−8.9 (16.0)	−11.7 (10.9)
Average precipitation mm (inches)	114.1 (4.49)	94.4 (3.72)	92.0 (3.62)	60.5 (2.38)	68.5 (2.70)	80.6 (3.17)	69.3 (2.73)	108.9 (4.29)	93.2 (3.67)	130.2 (5.13)	123.8 (4.87)	120.9 (4.76)	1,156.2 (45.52)
Average precipitation days (≥ 1.0 mm)	15	14	16	12	12	12	12	15	13	17	17	17	170
Mean monthly sunshine hours	45.2	60.9	95.1	137.6	171.4	147.0	132.2	128.5	99.8	79.6	54.8	40.1	1,192.2
Source 1: KNMI
Source 2: Weather2Travel (sunshine hours)

=== Geology ===
Whilst bedrock surface exposure is limited in the city, Galway exhibits a "diverse geological foundation" according to the Geological Survey of Ireland who conducted an audit of the county geological sites in Galway city in 2020:

The city hosts the three main rock types: igneous rock at the west, metamorphic rock in the centre and sedimentary rock at the east. In addition to this trinity of geological bedrock types, the bedrock surface is blanketed with glacial sediments (tills) that were deposited during the last ice age, around 18,000 years ago. Furthermore, the karst limestone underlying the east side of the city ensures that freshwater is transported seaward via subterranean conduits, as well as by the city's river and canals.

=== Places of interest ===
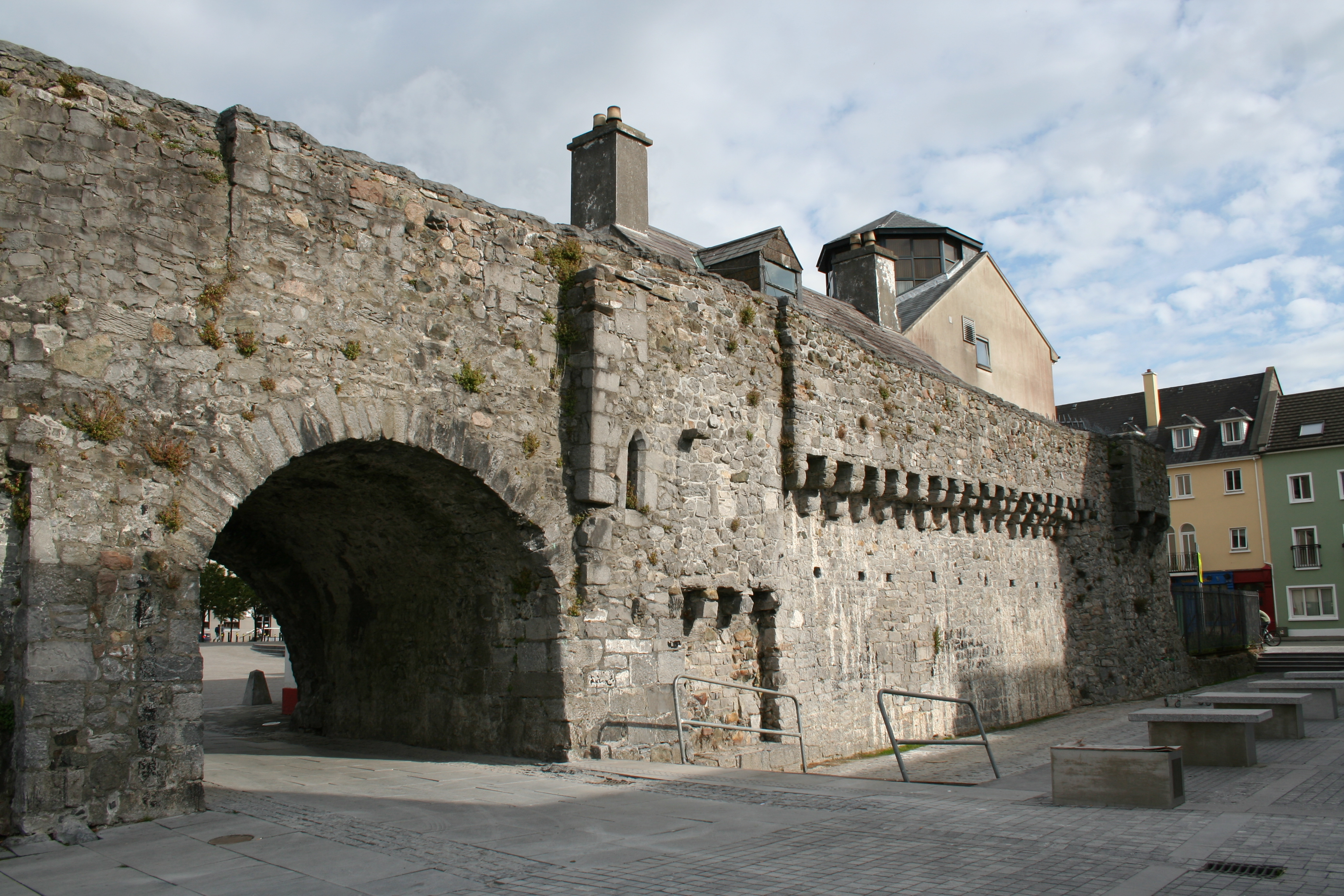
Spanish Arch

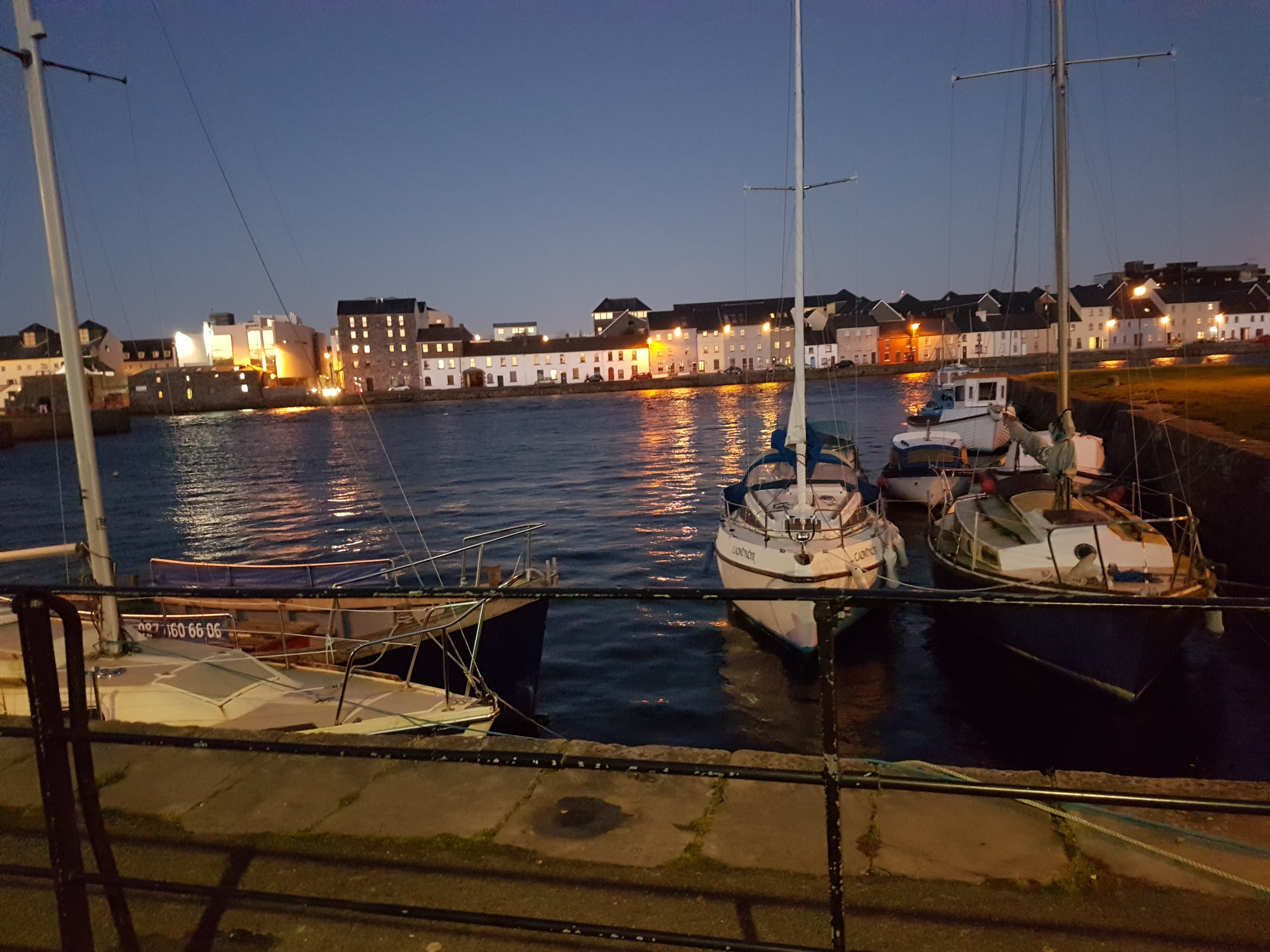
Galway River Corrib (Riverside) Quay near Spanish arch captured on a winter evening.

Galway Cathedral

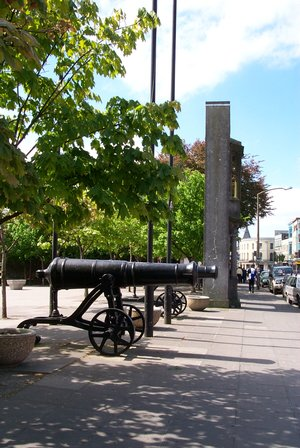
These cannons, previously at Eyre Square and since moved to Galway City Hall, were presented to the Connaught Rangers at the end of the Crimean War (1854–1856) in recognition of their military achievements.

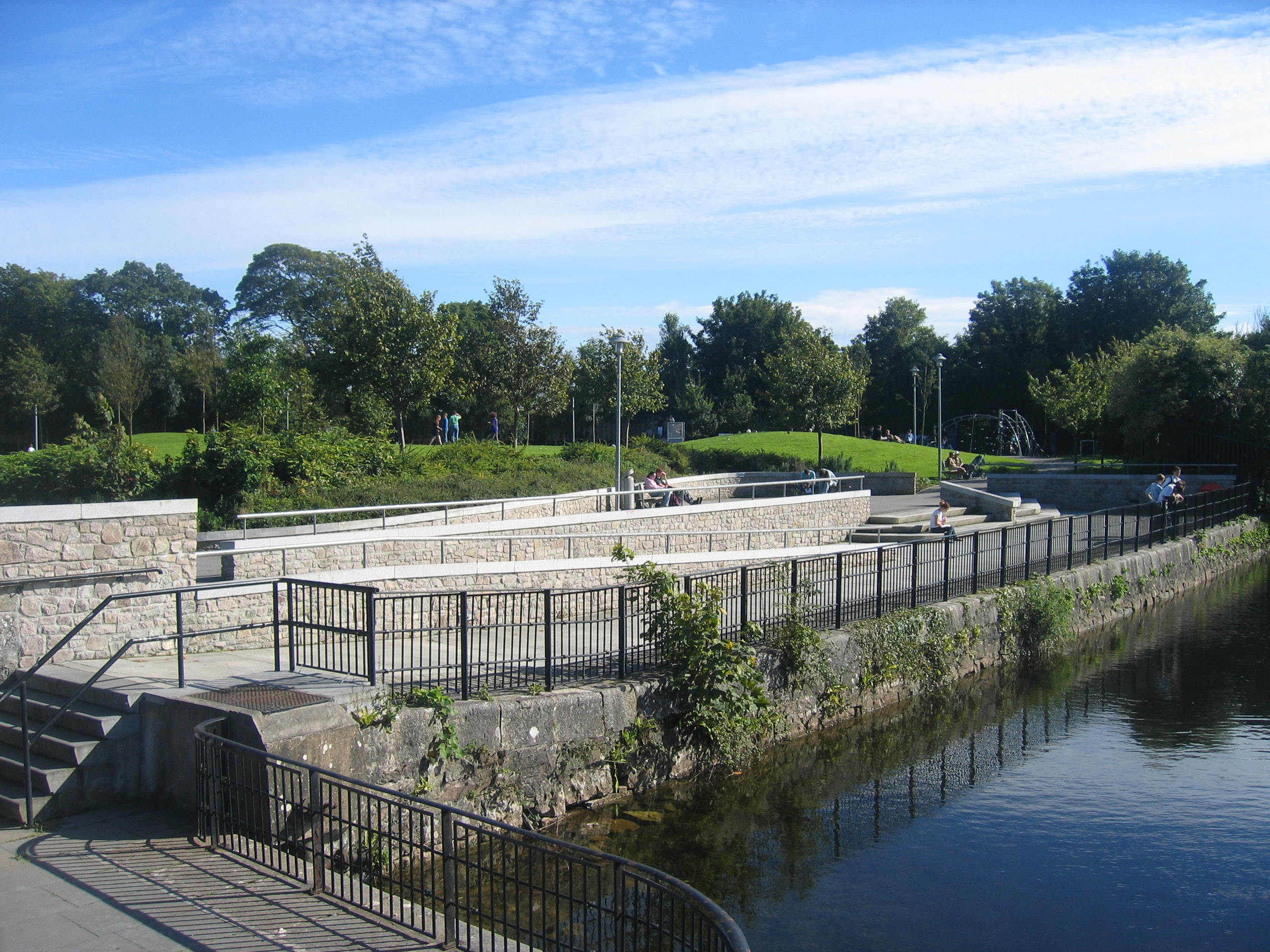
The Millennium Children's Park in Galway, next to the Eglinton Canal.

- Lynch's Castle on Shop Street is a medieval townhouse built by the prosperous Lynch family in the 16th century and is now a branch of Allied Irish Banks.
- St. Nicholas' Collegiate Church is the largest medieval church still in everyday use in Ireland. This Church of Ireland church was founded in 1320 and enlarged in the following two centuries.
- Galway Cathedral, known as the Cathedral of Our Lady Assumed into Heaven and St Nicholas, was built on the site of the old Galway Gaol and consecrated in 1965. It is constructed of limestone. It has an eclectic style, with a Renaissance Revival dome, pillars and round arches, and a Romanesque Revival portico that dominates the main façade – which is an unusual feature in a modern Irish church building.
- The original quadrangle building of the University of Galway which was erected in 1849 (during the Great Famine or An Gorta Mór) as one of the three colleges of the Queen's University of Ireland (along with Queen's University Belfast and University College Cork). The university holds the UNESCO archive of spoken material for the Celtic languages.
- The Hardiman, originally the Railway Hotel, was built by the Great Southern Railway Company in 1845. Also known over the years as the Great Southern Hotel and then Hotel Meyrick, it sits at the southern perimeter of Eyre Square and is the city's oldest hotel still in operation.
- The remains of Menlo Castle can be seen outside the city, on the eastern bank of the River Corrib. It was one of the ancestral homes of the Blake family, one of the Tribes of Galway from c. 1600–1910. The façade of the family's townhouse ("Blake's Castle") is still extant next to the Jury's Hotel at the bottom of Quay Street.
- Eglinton Canal, named after Archibald Montgomerie, 13th Earl of Eglinton, a former Lord Lieutenant of Ireland, joins the River Corrib to the sea, and flows for just more than a kilometre from the university to the Claddagh.
- The Claddagh is the oldest part of Galway but little or nothing remains of its old thatched village. However, on a side altar of the parish church, St Mary's on the Hill, is the late medieval statue of Our Lady of Galway. The ancient ritual of the Blessing of the Bay takes place on the Sunday nearest to the feast of the Assumption.
- "The Browne doorway", originally located on Lower Abbeygate Street but now standing at the north end of Eyre Square, was the doorway to the townhouse of the Browne family, one of the fourteen Tribes of Galway.
- "The Lynch Window", on Market Street, at which is a plaque commemorating one of the city's legends. According to legend, in 1493, the mayor of Galway, James Lynch FitzStephen, hanged his own son for the murder of a young Spanish visitor who had the misfortune to befriend the girlfriend of the mayor's son.
- The Hall of the Red Earl (Halla an Iarla Rua) can be viewed through a protective glass wall off Flood Street. It is the earliest medieval settlement fragment surviving within the walls of the city. It was built by the de Burgo family in the 13th century and was a key municipal building for the collection of taxes, dispensation of justice and hosting banquets. It was the medieval equivalent of tax office, court house and town hall.

==== The Claddagh ====
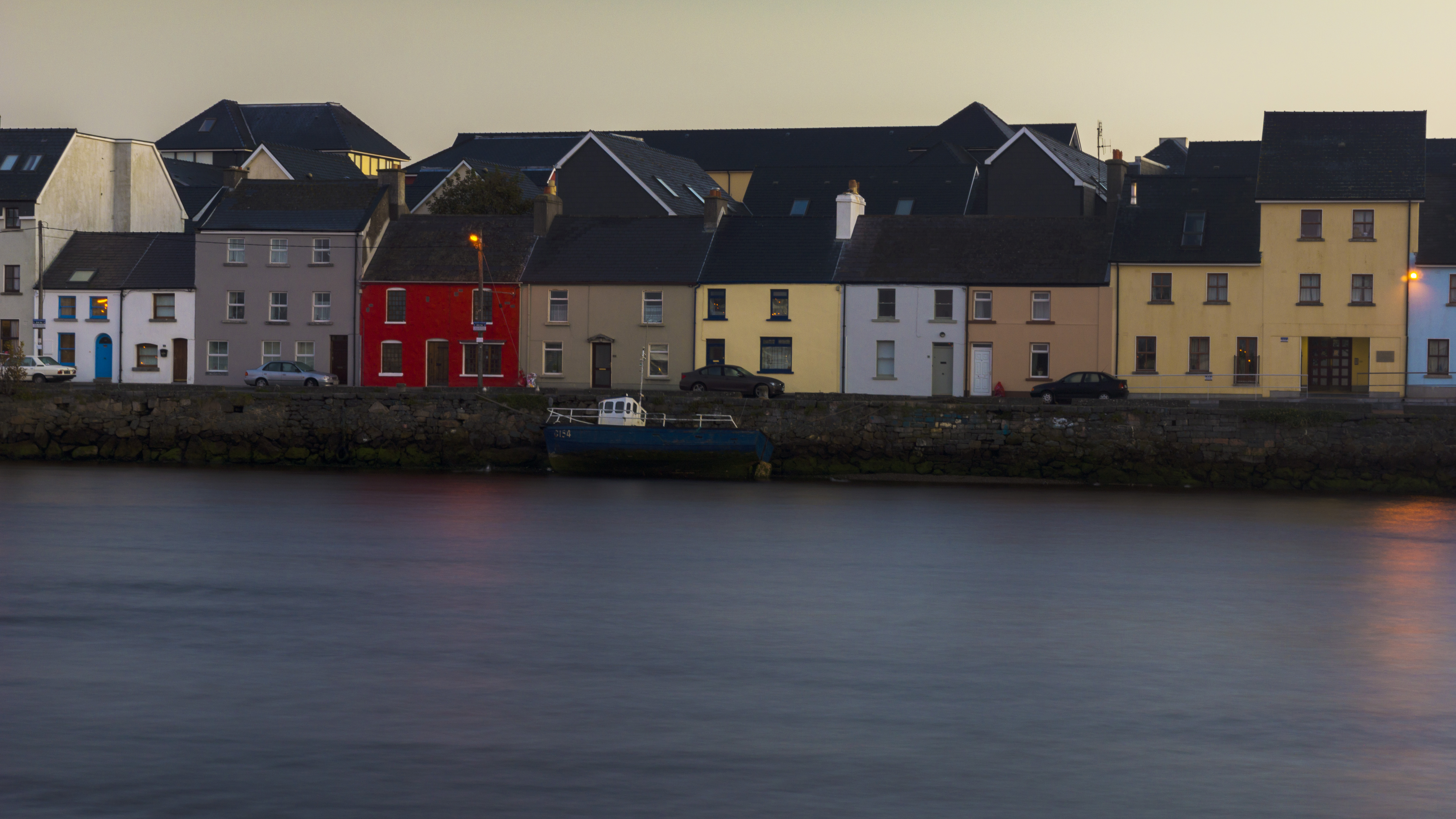
The Long Walk at Sunrise

On the west bank of the River Corrib as it enters the sea is the ancient neighbourhood of The Claddagh. For centuries it was an Irish-speaking enclave outside the city walls. Claddagh residents were mainly fisher folk and were governed by an elected 'King'. The King of the Claddagh settled or arbitrated disputes among the locals and had the privilege of a white sail on his fishing boat. While the last holder of the title died in 1972, it is still used in a purely honorary and ceremonial context. The area is also known for its association with the Claddagh Ring.

==== Museums ====
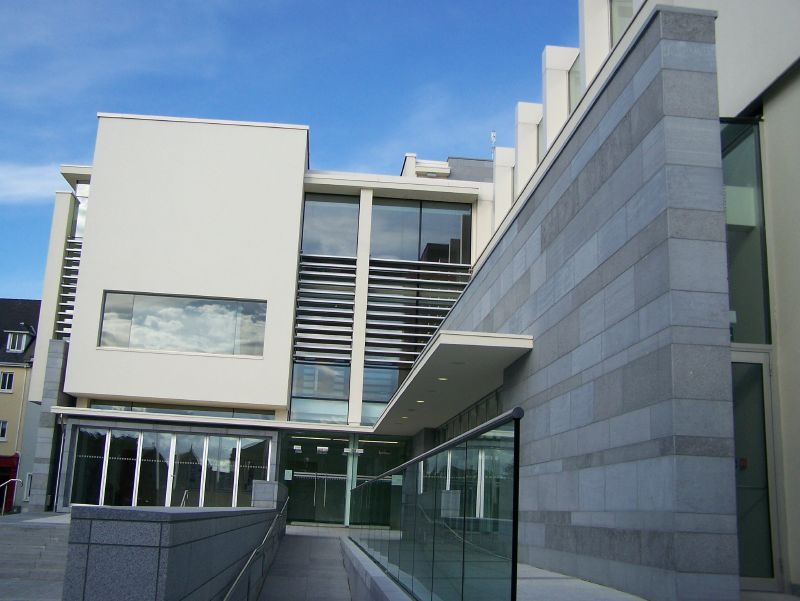
Galway City Museum

The Galway City Museum has two main sections: one about the heritage of Galway and one about Irish artists from the second half of the 20th century. This museum also houses the statue of the poet, Pádraic Ó Conaire which was originally located in the Kennedy Park section of Eyre Square, prior to the Square's renovation. A replica of the statue was erected in Eyre Square in 2017. The museum is near the Spanish Arch, the historical remnants of the 16th century wall.

The city's university, the University of Galway, has several museums, including the James Mitchell Geology Museum and the Computing and Communications Museum of Ireland.

The Nora Barnacle House Museum in Bowling Green is the smallest museum in Ireland. Nora was the lover, companion and, later, wife of writer James Joyce.

==== Cemeteries ====
Fort Hill Cemetery, on Lough Atalia Road, is the oldest cemetery still in use in Galway City. On the northern wall is a memorial to more than 300 sailors of the Spanish Armada who were executed en masse and buried here in the 1580s.

Rahoon Cemetery (officially known as Mount St. Joseph Cemetery), Rahoon Road, on the western edge of the city affords views of the city. It is one of two cemeteries operated by Galway City Council. Among the people buried here are Michael Bodkin (an admirer of Nora Barnacle who was the inspiration for James Joyce's character Michael Furey in "The Dead"), Michael Feeney (the "lover" in Joyce's poem She Weeps Over Rahoon), and actress Siobhán McKenna.

Bohermore Cemetery (or the New Cemetery, as it also known), Cemetery Cross, Bohermore, is the second cemetery operated by Galway City Council. It contains two mortuary chapels and is the burial place of several important Galwegians, including writer Pádraic Ó Conaire, propagandist William Joyce, dramatist Lady Gregory and sports official Michael Morris, 3rd Baron Killanin. The cemetery also contains a gravesite and memorial to those who died in the KLM Flight 607-E crash, off the coast of Galway, on 14 August 1958.

There are several smaller cemeteries within the city boundaries. Some are no longer in use or are used primarily by families with legacy burial rights. These are St James's Cemetery (Teampall) in Glenina Heights, Menlo Cemetery near Menlo Castle, Ballybrit Graveyard near the entrance to Galway Racecourse, and a very ancient early Christian graveyard at Roscam near Merlin Park. Several city churches have crypts or attached graveyards which were formerly used for the interment of clergy and parishioners – Castlegar Church, Claddagh Church, St Patrick's Church on Forster Street, St. Nicholas' Collegiate Church and Galway Cathedral.

== Demographics ==
The 2022 census indicated that Galway city had a population of 85,910, an increase of over 10,000 from the 2011 census figures.

In 2009, approximately 80% of the population of Galway were Irish. Following an influx of immigrants to Galway during the 2000s, approximately 20% of the population was non-Irish. Slightly more than half of this group (11.3%) are non-Irish Europeans, coming from Poland and other Central European and Baltic States, such as Latvia and Lithuania. Smaller numbers of Asian and African immigrants come from East Africa, Nigeria, Zimbabwe and Sri Lanka. In the 2006 census, 15.4% of the population were aged 0–14, 76.1% were aged 15–64, and 8.5% were aged over 65. 51.9% of the population were female and 48.1% were male.

As of the 2016 census, the population of the city and suburbs were 70.8% white Irish, 14.68% other white, 3.08% black/black Irish, 3.07% Asian/Asian Irish, 2.2% other, with 4% not stating an ethnicity. By the 2022 census, 64.3% of respondents identified as white Irish, 12.98% other white, 2.8% black/black Irish, 4.7% Asian/Asian Irish, 2.7% other, with 10.3% not stating an ethnicity.

In 2016, there were 16,844 families in Galway City. As of the 2022 census, 17,245 families were reported, an increase of over 2% from 2016. The average number of children per family in the city was 1.10, lower than the national average of 1.34.

== Politics ==
=== Local government ===
With a population of 79,934, Galway is the fourth most populous urban area in the State and the 23rd most populous area of local government. Services such as waste collection, recycling, traffic control, parks and housing are controlled by an eighteen-member city council elected to five-year terms by proportional representation through means of the single transferable vote. The City Council is chaired by a mayor who is elected to a one-year term by fellow councillors. The role of mayor is mainly ceremonial, although they do have the casting vote. The first mayor was Peirce Lynch Fitzjohn, elected in 1485. The current mayor, Cllr. Clodagh Higgins, was elected in June 2022.

In 1937, the Urban District of Galway became the Borough of Galway, remaining part of County Galway. In 1986, the Borough of Galway became the County Borough of Galway and ceased to be part of County Galway. In 2001, it was renamed Galway City.

The symbols of the office of the Mayor and the emblems of the dignity of the City Council are the Civic Sword (1620s) and the Great Mace (1710) which are carried in procession before the Mayor and Council on solemn civic occasions. When not in ceremonial use they can be seen at the Galway City Museum. In 1579, Elizabeth I confirmed the city's charter and appointed the Mayor as 'Admiral of the Bay and of the Aran islands'. The title, though extant, is rarely used except for ceremonial purposes.

The highest honour the city can bestow is the freedom of the city. Among the names on the roll of honour are: Douglas Hyde, President of Ireland, 1939; Éamon de Valera, Taoiseach, 1946; Seán T. O'Kelly, President of Ireland, 1950; Robert F. Wagner, Mayor of New York, 1961; John F. Kennedy, President of the US, 1963; Pope John Paul II, 1979; Ronald Reagan, President of the US, 1984; Hillary Clinton, 1999; Richard M. Daley, Mayor of Chicago, 2003; Nelson Mandela, 2003; Aung San Suu Kyi, Burmese activist/leader, 2005; Garry Hynes, Druid Theatre Founder, 2006; and Michael D. Higgins, President of Ireland, 2012.

=== National politics ===
Galway City is part of the Galway West constituency of Dáil Éireann. Its TDs are:

- Noel Grealish (Independent). A native of An Carn Mór.
- Hildegarde Naughton (Fine Gael). Former senator and city councillor.
- Mairéad Farrell (Sinn Féin). From Mervue. Former city councillor.
- John Connolly (Fianna Fáil). Former city councillor.
- Seán Kyne (Fine Gael). Former senator from Maigh Cuillin.

Other national politicians, associated with the city, have included:

- Catherine Connolly (Independent). Former Mayor of Galway and TD who has been President of Ireland since 2025.
- Michael D. Higgins, President of Ireland from 2011 to 2025. Higgins was formerly a TD for the Galway West parliamentary constituency, of which Galway City is a part, and was Mayor of Galway for two terms.
- Éamon Ó Cuív (Fianna Fáil) served as a Teachta Dála (TD) for the Galway West constituency from 1992 to 2024. He is a former Minister for Social Protection and Minister for Community, Rural and Gaeltacht Affairs.

=== Courts ===
Galway's District Court is the main court of summary jurisdiction and hears minor cases without a jury. It is responsible for hearing small civil claims, and certain family law cases, administers the liquor licensing laws and is responsible for indicting the accused and sending them forward for trial at the Circuit Court and the Central Criminal Court.

The Circuit Court in Galway tries all indictable offences (those cases triable by a judge and jury), except murder, rape, treason, piracy and genocide, which are reserved to the Central Criminal Court. It can also hear appeals from the District Court. Its decisions can be appealed to the Court of Appeal. Civilly, the court is limited to compensation claims of not more than €75,000. Both parties may waive this amount and grant the court unlimited jurisdiction. Divorce, Judicial Separation and probate cases can be heard provided they are within the financial parameters of the court's jurisdiction. Decisions in civil cases can be appealed to the High Court.

The High Court sits four times a year in Galway to hear original actions (actions that are not appeals from lower courts). It also sits twice a year in Galway to hear appeals from the Circuit Court in civil and family law cases. Its decisions can be appealed to the Court of Appeal, or in some instances, to the Supreme Court, which sits in Dublin.

== Culture ==
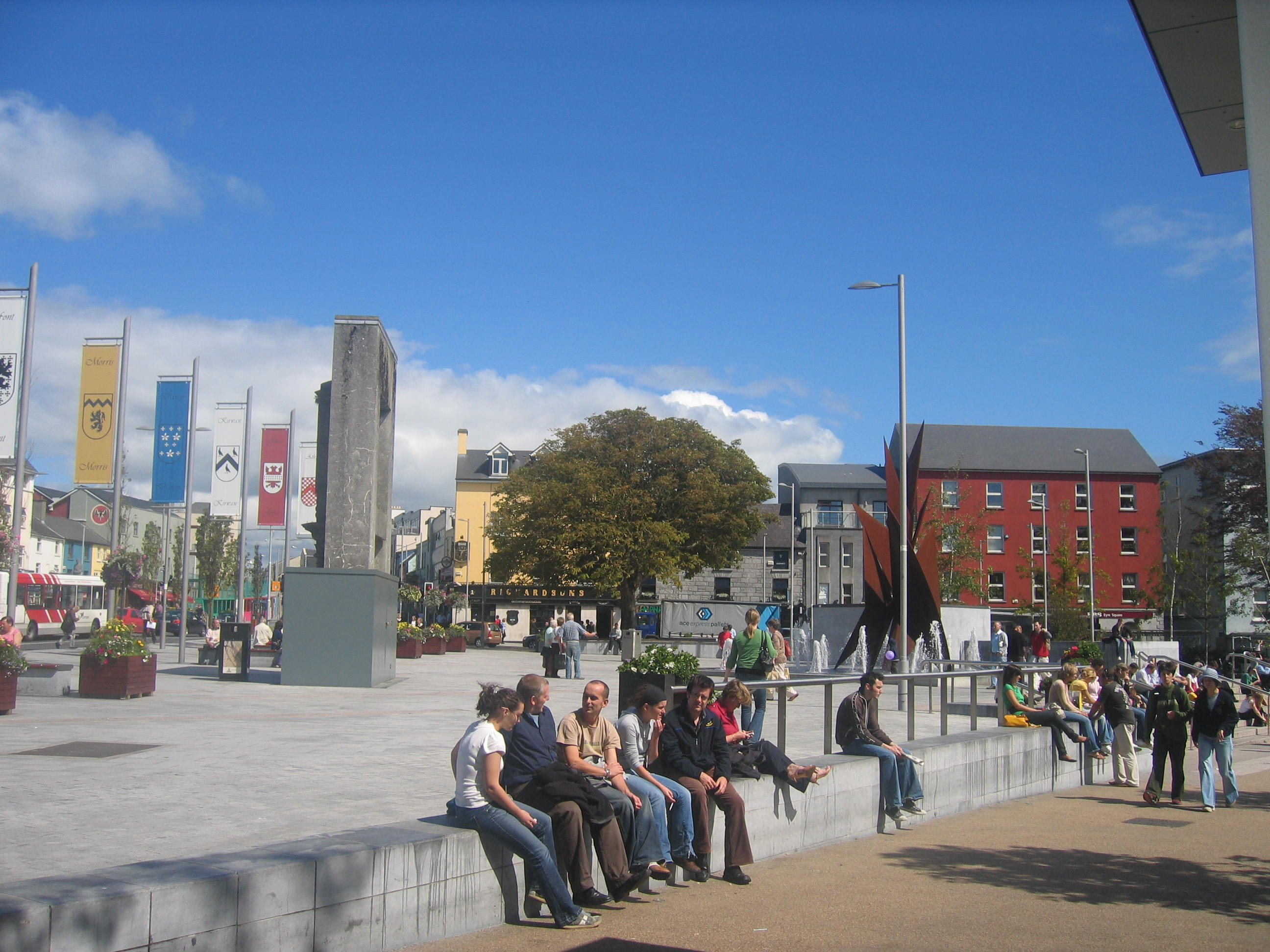
Eyre Square is at the centre of the city.

Galway is known as "Ireland's Cultural Heart" (Croí Cultúrtha na hÉireann) and hosts numerous festivals, celebrations and events. Every November, Galway hosts the Tulca Festival of Visual Arts as well as numerous festivals.

On 1 December 2014, the Director General of UNESCO announced the official designation of Galway as a UNESCO City of Film.

In 2004, there were three dance organisations, ten festival companies, two film organisations, two Irish language organisations, 23 musical organisations, twelve theatre companies, two visual arts groups, and four writers' groups based in the city.

Furthermore, there were 51 venues for events, most of which were specialised for a certain field (e.g. concert venues or visual arts galleries), though ten were described as being 'multiple event' venues. The main squares in the city are Eyre Square (containing John F. Kennedy Park) in the centre of the city, and Spanish Parade next to the Spanish Arch.

In 2007, Galway was named as one of the eight "sexiest cities" in the world. A 2008 poll ranked Galway as the 42nd best tourist destination in the world, or 14th in Europe and 2nd in Ireland (behind Dingle). It was ranked ahead of all European capitals except Edinburgh, and many traditional tourist destinations (such as Venice).

=== The arts ===
==== Literature ====
Among the poets currently writing in Galway are Fred Johnston, Patrick Deeley, Rita Ann Higgins, Mary O'Malley, Moya Cannon, Eva Bourke, Kevin Higgins, Ndrek Gjini, and Elaine Feeney. Walter Macken, Eilís Dillon, Máirtín Ó Direáin, Máirtín Ó Cadhain, Liam O'Flaherty, Pádraic Ó Conaire and Ken Bruen are well-known writers in both English and Irish with a connection to Galway. The writer and publisher Frank Harris was born in Galway.

The James Hardiman Library at the University of Galway houses around 350 archived and/or digitised collections including the Thomas Kilroy Collection, the Brendan Duddy Papers on the Northern Ireland conflict, the John McGahern archive and the manuscript Minutes of Galway City Council from the 15th to mid-19th centuries.

Among the literary magazines published in Galway are The Galway Review, Crannóg Magazine, which describes itself as 'Ireland's premier independent fiction and poetry magazine since 2002' and ROPES, an annual literary journal published by students of the MA in Literature and Publishing at the University of Galway. Galway also has Charlie Byrne's Bookshop.

Gretta Conroy, in James Joyce's short story "The Dead", remembers her lover Michael Furey throwing stones against the window of her grandmother's house on Nun's Island, in the city. Joyce's poem She Weeps Over Rahoon describes the grief of Joyce's wife Nora Barnacle over the death of her onetime boyfriend Michael Bodkin. Both Bodkin and Nora were from Galway and Bodkin is buried in Rahoon Cemetery in the western suburbs of the city.

Walter Macken's novel Rain on the Wind is set in the city, as are the "Jack Taylor" crime novels of Ken Bruen.

==== Film ====
Galway has four cinema complexes within or near the city centre: the 11-screen IMC cinema, the 9-screen EYE cinema, the 10-screen Omniplex in Salthill and the 3-screen arthouse cinema Pálás.

On 1 December 2014, Galway was granted designation as a Unesco "City of Film".

Galway is home to the Galway Film Fleadh, a film festival which was founded in 1989 and which takes place over six days each July. The Galway Film Fleadh is a platform for international cinema in Ireland and an advocate for Irish national cinema, for which the festival's identity has become synonymous. It is an industry festival, with many industry events taking place under the name of the Galway Film Fair. In 2014, a MovieMaker magazine panel of U.S. filmmakers, critics and industry executives included the Galway Film Fleadh on its list of the "25 Coolest Film Festivals in the World".

==== Theatre ====
Galway has a permanent Irish language theatre located in the city centre, Taibhdhearc na Gaillimhe, which was established in 1928 and has produced some of Ireland's most celebrated actors. The Druid Theatre Company is also based in the city.

There are several theatres in the city, including Nuns Island Theatre, Bank of Ireland Theatre, Druid Lane Theatre, Black Box Theatre, and Town Hall Theatre (a modern art theatre established in 1995).

Two of the most celebrated Irish actors of the 20th century, Siobhán McKenna and Peter O'Toole, have strong family connections with Galway. Other well-known actors include Mick Lally, Seán McGinley and Marie Mullen, all three of whom were founders of the Druid Theatre Company. Other actors with strong Galway connections are Pauline McLynn, (Shameless and Father Ted), Nora Jane Noone, and Aoife Mulholland.

Garry Hynes, the first artistic director of Druid Theatre, was the first woman ever to win a Tony Award for direction.

=== Music ===
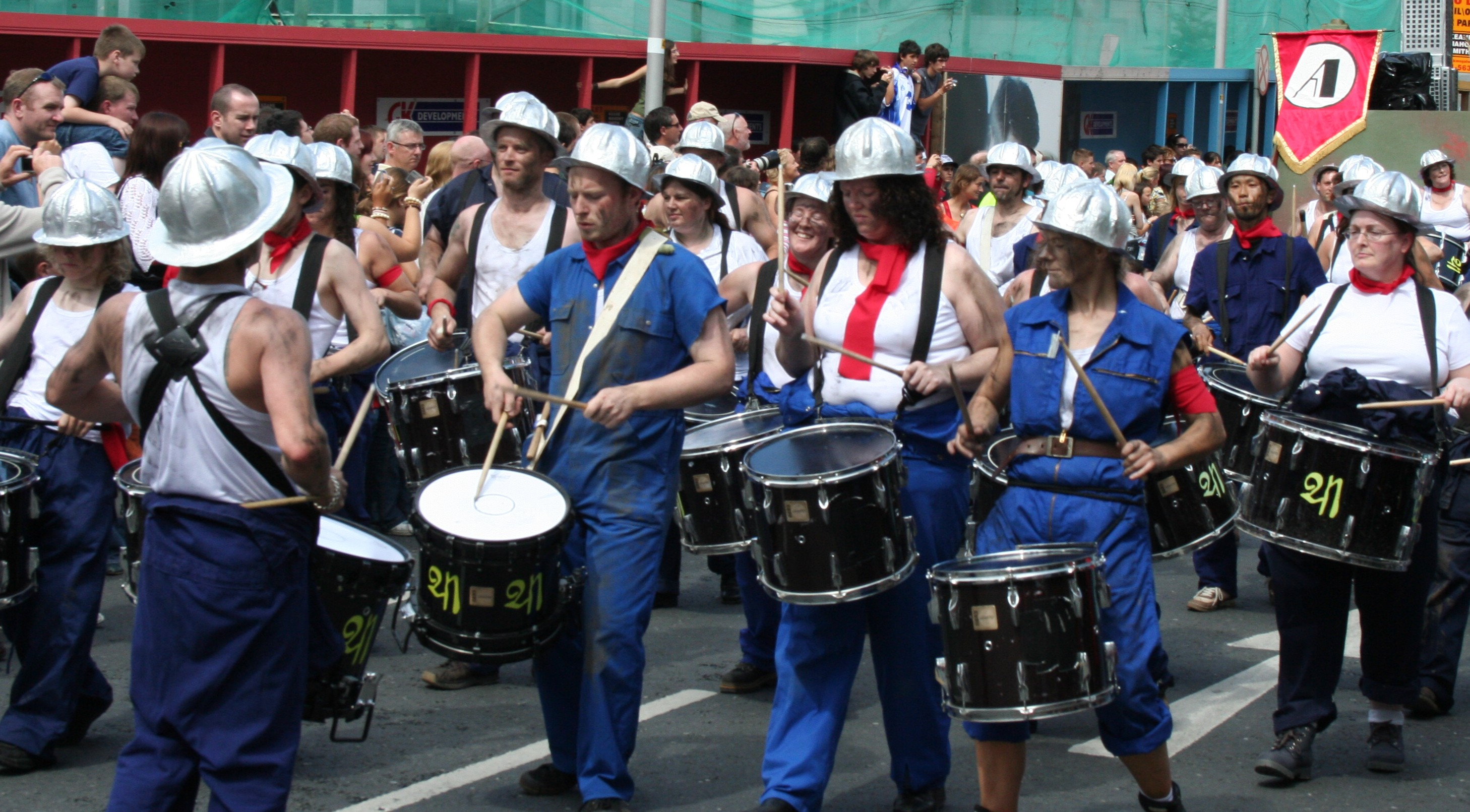
Galway Arts Festival Parade 2007

Galway has a varied musical scene. As in most Irish cities, traditional music is played in pubs and by street performers. Galway Early Music Festival presents European music from the 12th to the 18th century. It encourages not only music but also dance and costumes. The festival involves both professional and amateur musicians.

Galway Cathedral Recitals is an international series of concerts of classical music which has taken place in Galway Cathedral each July and August since 1994.

A number of choirs are based in the city, including the Tribal Chamber Choir (founded in 2009); the Galway Baroque Singers (founded in 1983); Cois Cladaigh Chamber Choir (founded in 1982) and which sang at the inauguration of President Michael D. Higgins in St Patrick's Hall, Dublin Castle on 11 November 2011; Galway Gospel Choir (founded in 2001); and Galway Choral Association (founded in 1998). Galway Cathedral is home to Galway Cathedral Choir (founded in 1965), which sings every Sunday and at all the major ceremonies in the cathedral. In addition to its parish choir the Collegiate Church of St Nicholas is home to two other choral groups, the Choral Scholars (adult) and the Schola Cantorum (juvenile).

The Galway Arts Festival (Féile Ealaíon na Gaillimhe) takes place in July. It was first held in 1978 and since then has grown into one of the biggest arts festivals in Ireland. It attracts international artists as well as provides a platform for local and national performers. The festival features parades, street performances and plays, musical concerts and comedy acts. Highlights of the festival tend to be performances by Macnas and Druid Theatre Company, two local performance groups. The Galway Youth Orchestra was formed in 1982.

The folk and traditional singer Dolores Keane lives in Galway.

==== Traditional Irish music ====
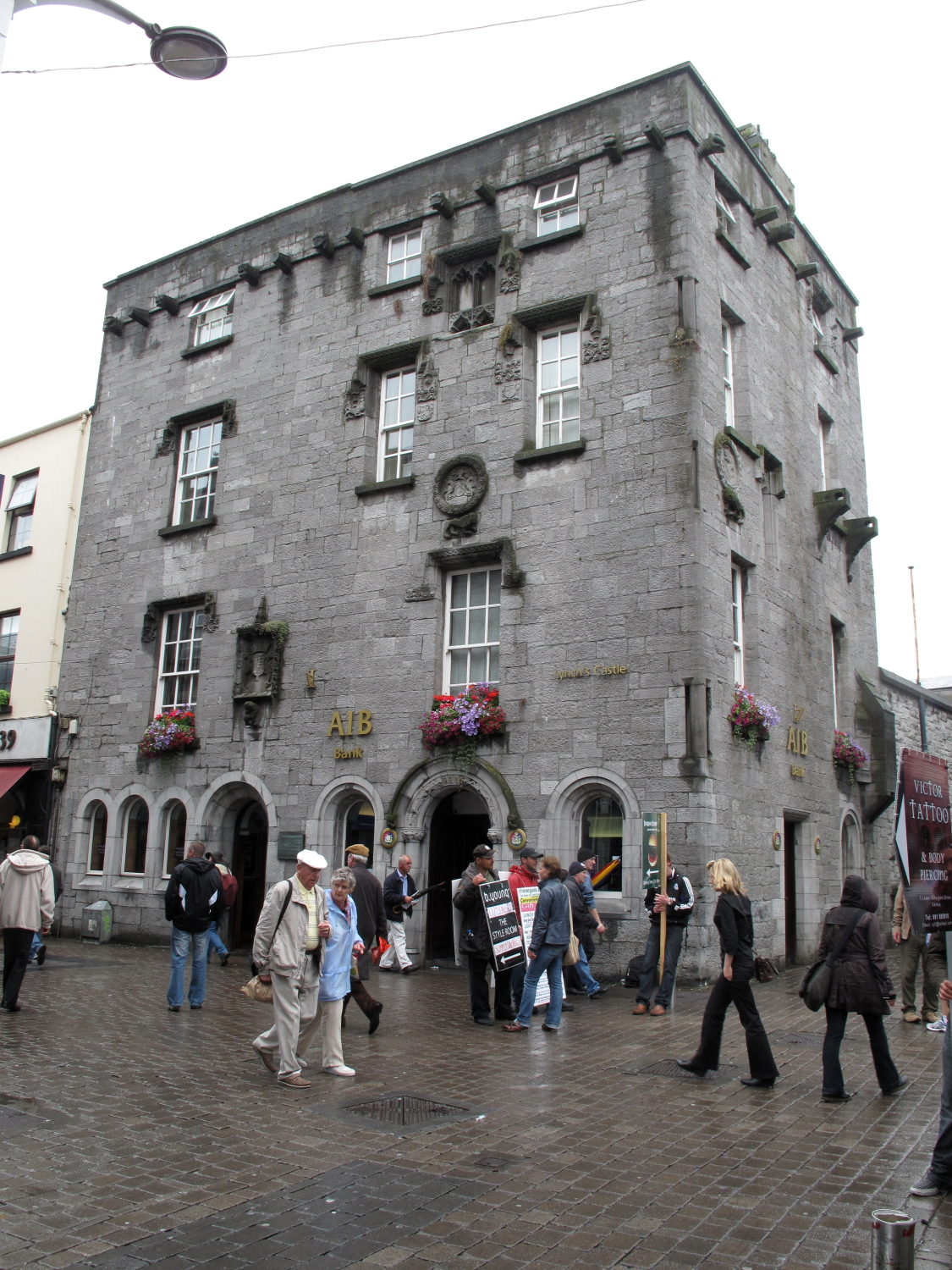
Lynch's Castle

Galway city is a major centre for traditional Irish music. The traditional group De Dannan were based in Galway. Musicians such as Mickey Finn, Frankie Gavin, Johnny (Ringo) McDonagh, Alec Finn, Máirtín O'Connor and Gerry Hanley were born or came to prominence in Galway. Carl Hession, an Irish composer, arranger and traditional musician, also hails from Galway city.

Comhaltas branches operate in several parts of the city, teaching Irish traditional music to children. Dusty Banjos runs classes and sessions in the city for adults switching from other musical traditions to Irish traditional music, and for adult beginners and improvers who are not at a level where they could participate in general sessions.

==== Popular and live music ====
Traditional and contemporary music can be heard at numerous locations around the city. Among the more notable locations are The Crane Bar on Sea Road, Tigh Neachtáin Quay Street and Róisín Dubh on Lr Dominic Street.

Galway and its people are mentioned in several songs, including Galway Girl (2000) (by Steve Earle) and Galway Girl (2017) (by Ed Sheeran).

=== Irish language ===
Galway City has a reputation among Irish cities for being associated with the Irish language, music, song and dancing traditions. It is sometimes referred to as the 'Bilingual Capital of Ireland', although like elsewhere in Ireland, inhabitants converse mostly in English. The city is well known for its "Irishness", mainly because it has on its doorstep the Galway Gaeltacht. Irish theatre, television and radio production and Irish music form a component of Galway city life, with both An Taibhdhearc, the National Irish Language Theatre, in Galway city itself, while TG4 and RTÉ Raidió na Gaeltachta headquarters are in the Connemara Gaeltacht elsewhere in County Galway. Four electoral divisions, or neighbourhoods (out of twenty-two), are designated as Gaeltachtaí. The University of Galway also holds the archive of spoken material for the Celtic languages.

=== Events and festivals ===
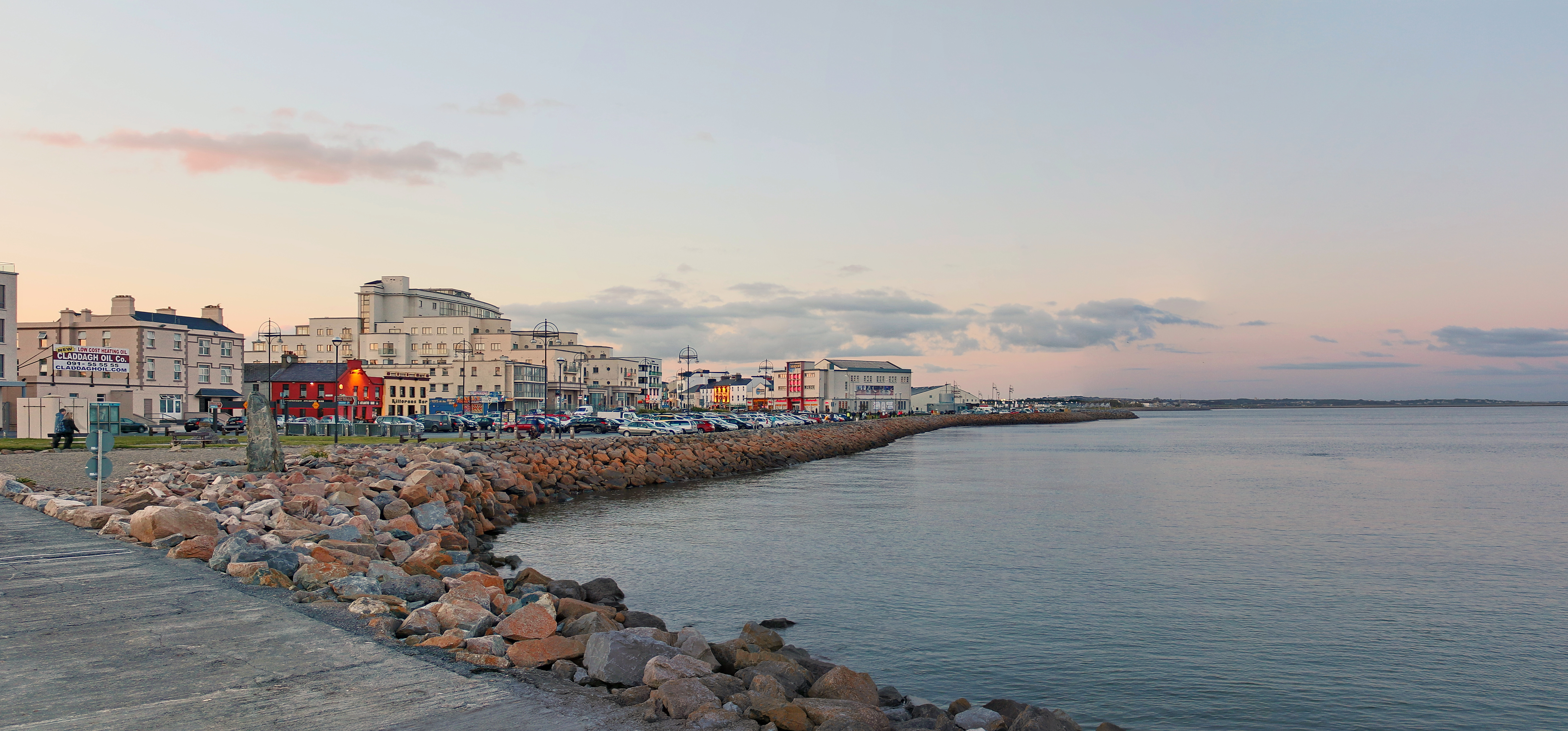
Salthill as well as Galway Bay are holiday destinations

Many sporting, music, arts and other events take place in the city. The largest of these annual events begins with the Galway Film Fleadh and the Galway Arts Festival in July, the Galway Races in August, and the Galway International Oyster Festival in September. Other events include the Fleadh Imboilg, the Baboró International Children's Festival, the Cúirt International Festival of Literature, the Galway Early Music Festival, Seachtain na Gaeilge (March), Salthill Air Show (June), the Colours Fringe Festival, Little Havana Festival, the Galway Sessions, Galway Garden Festival, Galway Comedy Festival, Baffle Poetry Festival, Galway Aboo Halloween Festival, Tulca Festival of Visual Arts, Irish Fly Fair and Angling Show, Galway Science and Technology Festival, Spirit of Voice Festival, Galway Christmas Market, Galway African Film Festival and Galway Pride Festival.

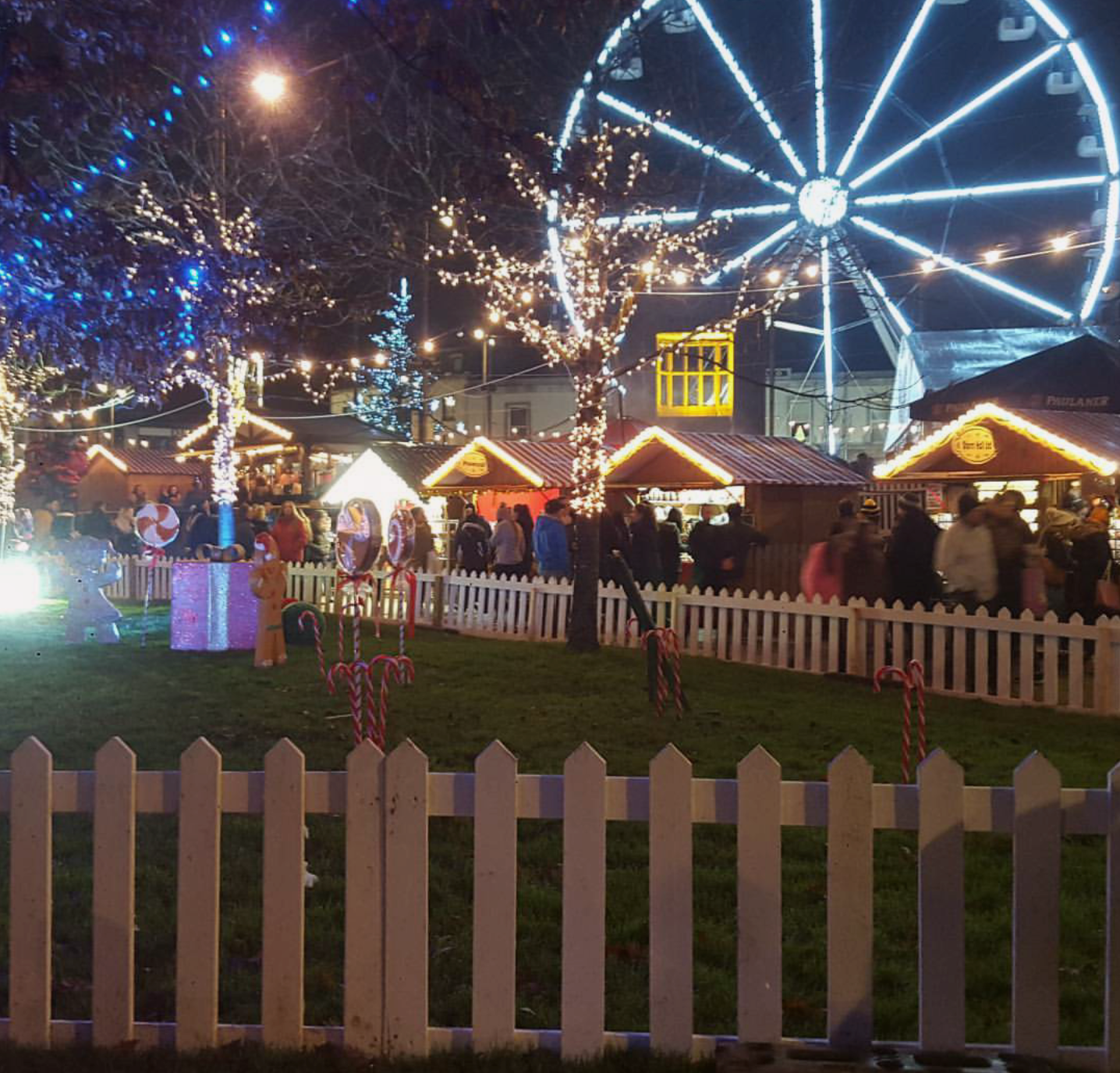
Galway Christmas market 2016

In June 2010, the Super8 Shots film festival was launched in Galway, the first Super 8 mm (0.31 in) film festival to occur in Ireland.

=== Religion ===
The patron saint of the city since the 14th century has been St Nicholas of Myra. The Roman Catholic diocese of Galway was created in 1831 following the abolition by the Holy See of the Wardenship of Galway. It was united with the diocese of Kilmacduagh (est. 1152) and given the administratorship of the diocese of Kilfenora (est. 1152) in 1883. Its full name is the Diocese of Galway, Kilmacduagh and Apostolic Administratorship of Kilfenora (in Irish – Deoise na Gaillimhe, Chill Mac Duach agus Riarachán Aspalda Cill Fhionnúrach, in Latin – Diocesis Galviensis, Duacensis ac Administratio Apostolica Finaborensis). The diocese is under the patronage of Our Lady Assumed into Heaven and St Nicholas (Galway), Saint Fachanan (Kilmacduagh) and St Colman (Kilfenora). As the diocese of Kilfenora is in the Ecclesiastical Metropolitan Province of Cashel the Bishop of Galway is its Apostolic Administrator rather than its bishop. The dioceses of Galway and Kilmacduagh are in the Ecclesiastical Metropolitan Province of Tuam. The current bishop is Most Rev. Martin Drennan, installed 3 July 2005. Of the 38 parishes in the RC diocese, 14 are situated in the city and are divided into two deaneries – the deanery of Galway City West and that of Galway City East. In each deanery, a Vicar Forane exercises limited jurisdiction on behalf of the bishop.

In the Church of Ireland, Galway is a parish of the United Diocese of Tuam, Killala and Achonry. The principal church of the parish is the St. Nicholas' Collegiate Church (founded 1320). Russian, Romanian, Coptic, and Mar Thoma Syrian Orthodox Churches use the facilities of St Nicholas Collegiate Church for their services. The Ahmadiyya-run Galway Mosque, opened in 2014, is the only purpose-built mosque in Galway.

=== Sport ===
Sports traditionally associated with Galway include horse racing, Gaelic games, association football and rugby. Other common sports in the city include rowing, basketball, motorsport and greyhound racing.

==== Horse racing ====
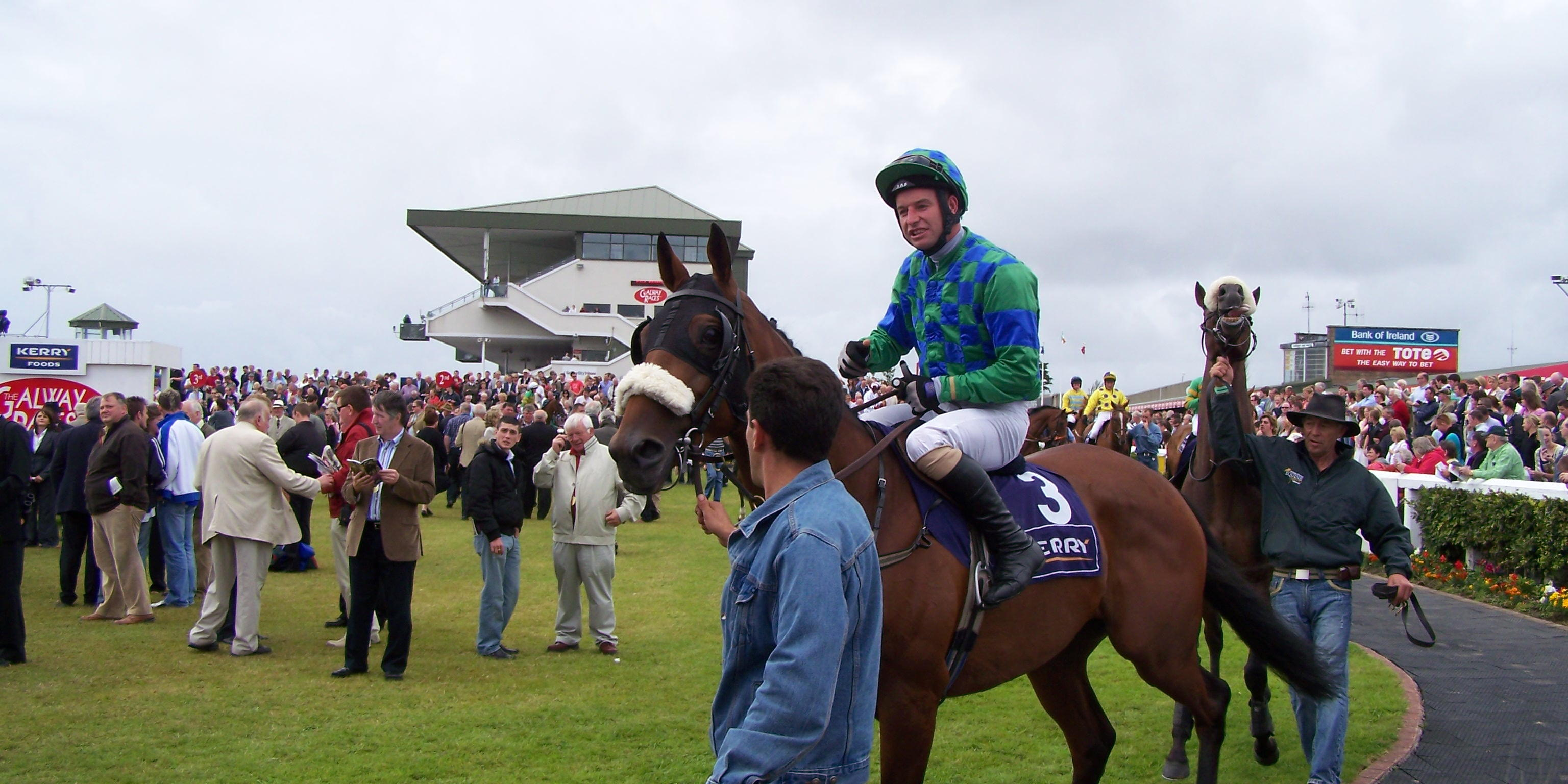
Jockey and horses preparing for the Galway Races

The Galway Races, first held in the 1860s, are widely known and one of the highlights of the Irish horse racing calendar. The festival, held over a week, has previously recorded attendances of between 120,0000 and 149,000 people.

==== Gaelic games ====
Pearse Stadium

Both hurling and Gaelic football are popular in Galway city. Pearse Stadium in Salthill is the home to Galway GAA, the county's Gaelic games body. Galway's hurlers compete annually in the All-Ireland Senior Hurling Championship for the Liam MacCarthy Cup. The Galway senior county hurling team have won the All-Ireland five times, including in 2017 when Galway lifted the Liam MacCarthy Cup for the first time in 29 years beating Waterford in the 2017 final. The Galway county football team competes annually in the All-Ireland Senior Football Championship for the Sam Maguire Cup. The Gaelic footballers have won the cup nine times, with the most recent being in 2001.

==== Association football ====
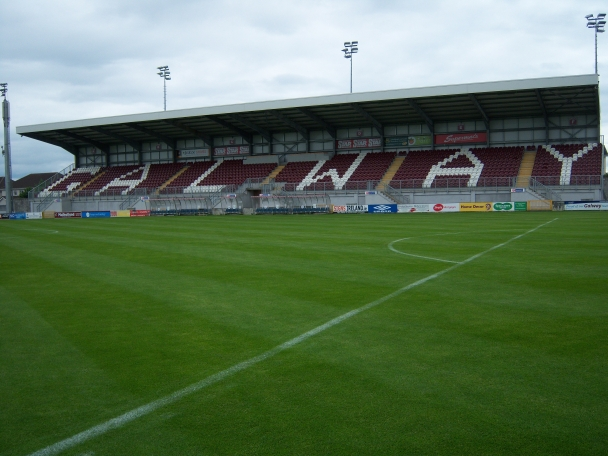
Eamonn Deacy Park, formerly Terryland Park, in Galway city

Galway United F.C., based at Eamonn Deacy Park (formerly Terryland Park) in the city, was playing in the League of Ireland Premier Division as of the 2026 season. Originally formed as Galway Rovers in the 1930s, the club was invited to enter the League of Ireland in 1977. Michael D. Higgins, later President of Ireland, has served as a president of the club in a ceremonial capacity. Galway United's men's team were FAI Cup winners in 1991 and League of Ireland Cup winners in 1986 and 1997, while the women's team were All-Island Cup winners in 2023 and 2024.

==== Rugby ====
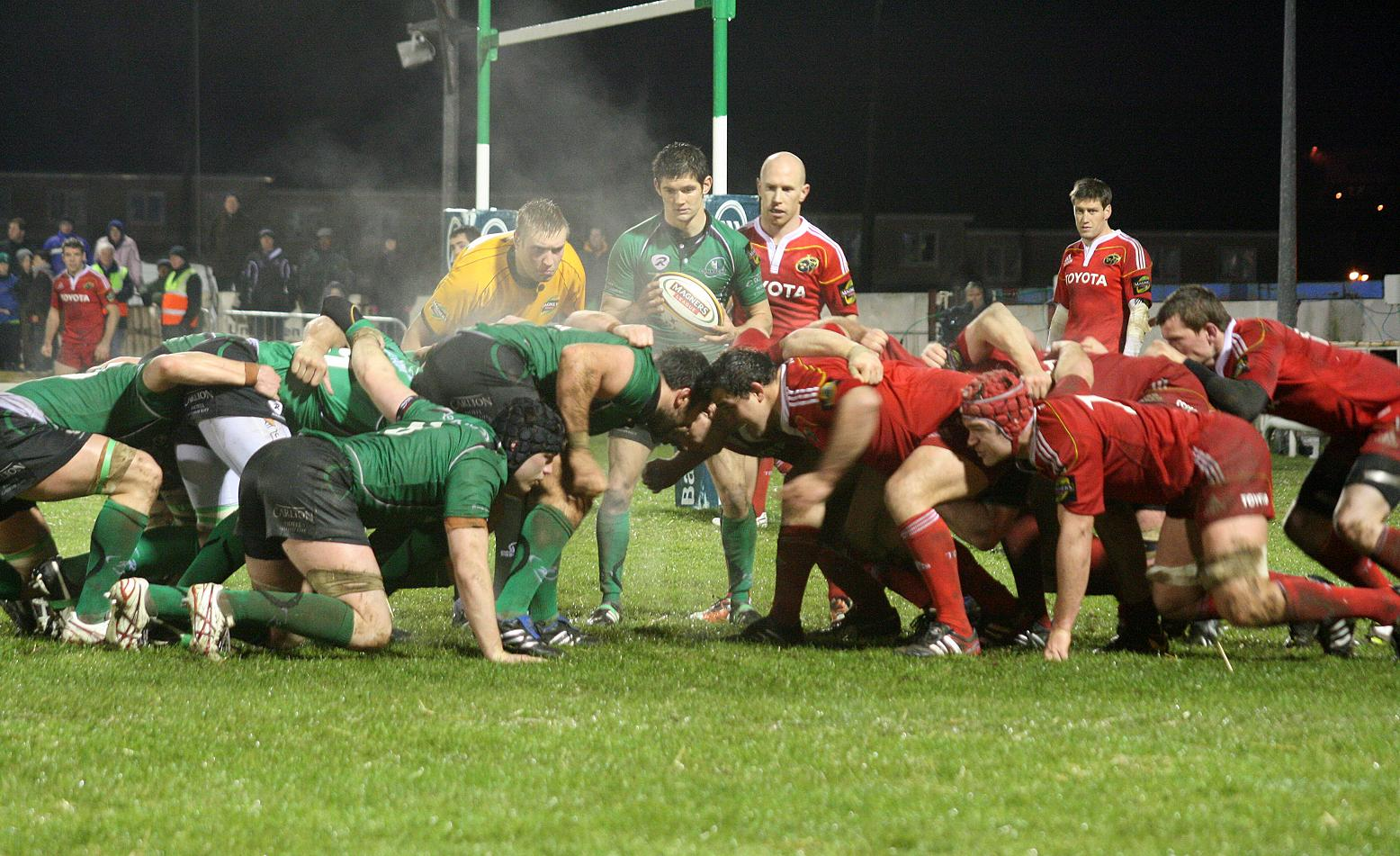
Connacht playing a 2010–11 Celtic League match, against Munster, at the Galway Sportsgrounds

The professional rugby union team for the province, Connacht Rugby, is based in the city and plays its home matches at the Galway Sportsgrounds. As of 2024, Connacht was playing in the United Rugby Championship (formerly Pro 12) competition and the European Rugby Champions Cup. The team won the 2015–2016 Pro12 competition by defeating reigning champions Glasgow Warriors in the semi-final and four-time champions Leinster Rugby in the 2016 Grand Final.

There are two senior amateur rugby union teams in Galway, Galwegians RFC and Galway Corinthians RFC, who play in the All-Ireland League. There are also two junior clubs, OLBC RFC & NUIG RFC who both participate in the Connacht Junior League. Galway Bay Rugby, established in 2007, offers "mini rugby" for children at in Galway City and its surrounds.

In rugby league, the Galway Tribesmen were All-Ireland Champions in 2020, and played in the first round of the 2022 Challenge Cup.

==== Watersports ====
Rowing on the River Corrib is undertaken by a number of rowing clubs. These include, among others, the Tribesmen Rowing Club, Galway Rowing Club, Coláiste Iognáid ('The Jes') Rowing Club, St. Joseph's Patrician College ('The Bish') Rowing Club and University of Galway Boat Club.

In sailing, Galway hosted a stopover in 2008–2009 Volvo Ocean Race. The city was also the finishing point of the round-the-world 2011–2012 Volvo Ocean Race.

There are 25m swimming pools, used by a number of competitive swimming clubs, at the Leisureland complex in Salthill and the KingFisher pools at the University of Galway and in Renmore.

==== Basketball ====
Moycullen Basketball Club, who were competing in the Super League as of the 2022–23 season, were the first Galway club to compete at the top tier of senior basketball in Ireland. While the club is situated in Moycullen, 13 km (8.1 mi) west of the city, it plays its senior home games in the Kingfisher Sports Centre at the University of Galway. In 2009, Moycullen's Cian Nihill became the second Galway man to represent Ireland at senior level, being selected 20 years after Oranmore/Maree's James Burke lined-out for the national team. As of 2023, Titans Basketball Club were the only club representing Galway in the (second tier) National League.

==== Boxing ====
Professional boxing events have occurred in the city since Galway native Kieran Molloy "[brought] professional boxing back to Galway" in 2023 for the first time since Coleman Barrett main evented in 2009. In 2024, Thomas O'Toole "main evented" at Leisureland in Galway.

==== Other sports ====
The Galway Greyhound Stadium, which opened in 1927 and shares some facilities with the Connacht rugby team, hosts greyhound racing events.

The Galway Lawn Tennis Club has indoor and outdoor facilities, including 9 tennis courts, 6 squash courts and 7 badminton courts, on a 3-acre (1.2 ha) site in Salthill.

Galway Hockey Club, a field hockey club formed in the early 1950s, is based at the University of Galway sports campus in Dangan.

== Economy and infrastructure ==
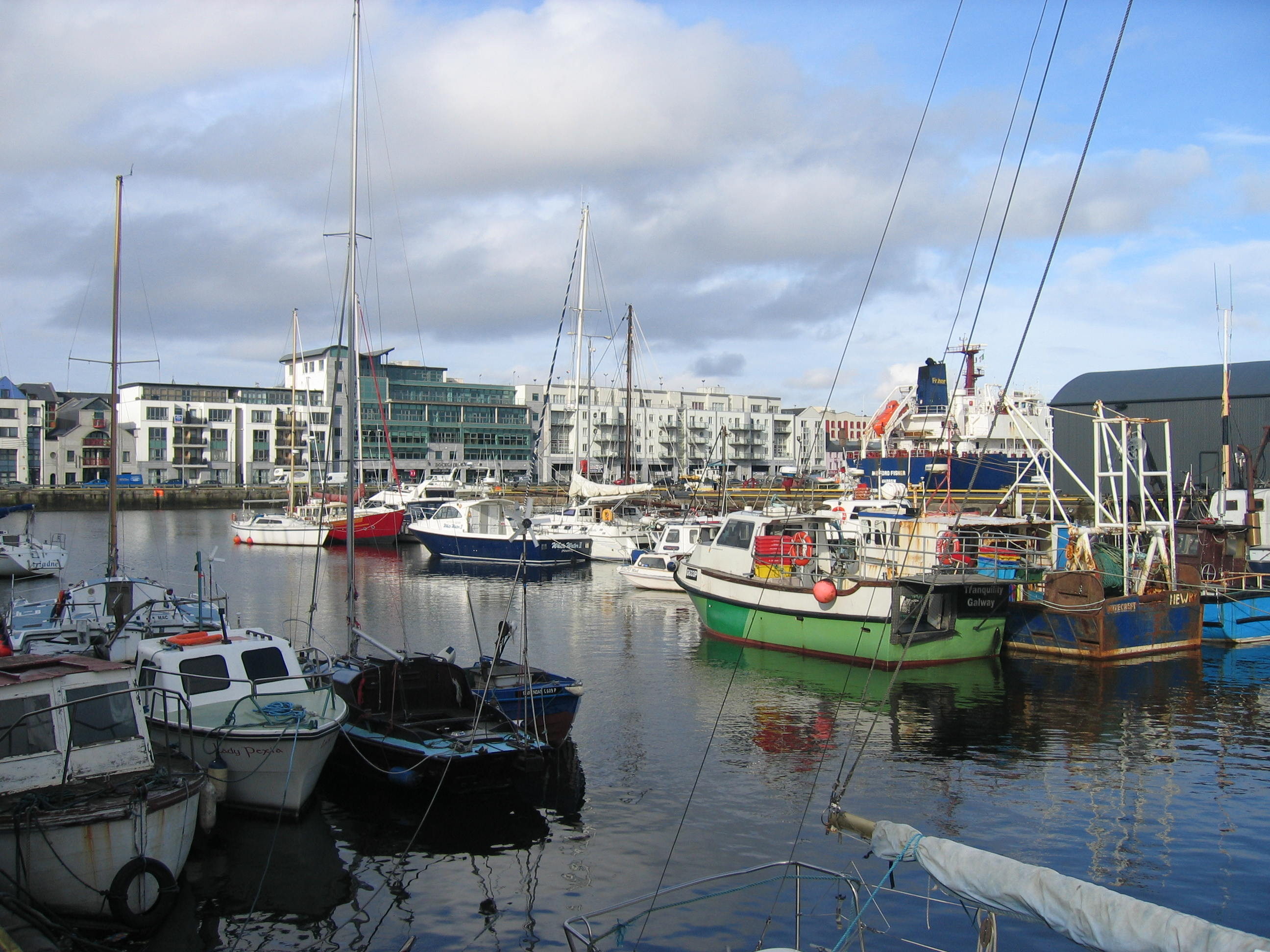
Galway Harbour

Galway City is the capital of Connacht. Galway has a strong local economy with complementary business sectors, including manufacturing industry, tourism, retail and distribution, education, healthcare and services that include financial, construction, cultural, and professional.

Most (47%) of the people employed in Galway work in either the commerce or professional sector, with a large number (17%) also employed in manufacturing. Most industry and manufacturing in Galway, like the rest of Ireland, is hi-tech (e.g. ICT, medical equipment, electronics, chemicals, etc.), due to the Celtic Tiger economic boom. Companies such as Boston Scientific, Medtronic, EA Games, Cisco and SAP AG have their regional offices or other offices in Galway City and environs. Tourism is also of major importance to the city, which had over 2.1 million visitors in 2000, and produced revenue of over €400 million.

The head office of Smyths, a toy shop company, is in Galway.

=== Media ===
==== Radio ====
There are two radio stations based in the city – Galway Bay FM (95.8 FM) broadcasts from the city to the whole county; Flirt FM (101.3 FM) is the student radio station for the University of Galway.

==== Print ====
One of the main regional newspapers for the county is The Connacht Tribune which prints two titles every week, the Connacht Tribune on Thursday, and the Galway City Tribune on Friday. As of January 2007, The Tribune has a weekly readership of over 150,000. Another Galway-based newspaper is the Galway Advertiser, a free paper printed every Thursday with an average of 160 pages and a circulation of 70,000 copies. It is the main paper of the Advertiser Newspaper Group which distributes 200,000 newspapers per and more week to a variety of other Irish cities and towns.

=== Transport ===
==== Air ====
Galway Airport, located 6 km (3.73 mi) east of the city at Carnmore, ceased to have scheduled passenger flights on 31 October 2011. Because the runway is too short to take modern passenger jet aircraft, it is only capable of limited operations. Aerfort na Minna (22 km (13.67 mi) west of the city) operates regular flights to each of the Aran Islands (Oileáin Árann). Shannon Airport (90 km) and Ireland West Airport (86 km) are the nearest international airports, both of which have flights around Ireland and to Britain, Continental Europe and North America (from Shannon).

==== Bus ====
Buses are the main form of public transport in the city and county. Routes operated by Bus Éireann include routes 401 (Salthill/Parkmore), 402 (Seacrest/Merlin Park), 404 (Newcastle/Oranmore), 405 (Rahoon/Ballybane), 407 (Bóthar an Chóiste) and 409 (Parkmore Industrial). Routes operated by City Direct include routes 410 (Salthill), 411 (Knocknacarra – Cappagh Rd), 412 (Knocknacarra Express), and 414 (Barna).

Various bus companies also provide links throughout County Galway and nationwide. These operate from a number of locations:

- The main bus and rail station in the city is Ceannt Station.
- Galway Coach Station, located at Fairgreen, is also a coach transport hub. Scheduled direct and commuter services operate between the Coach Station, Dublin and Dublin Airport, as well as services to Limerick, Cork and Clifden. These are operated by Aircoach and Citylink.
- Other regional bus operators use various bus stops around the city centre, and many serve the NUIG and ATU campuses as well.

The ongoing BusConnects public transport infrastructure programme aims to improve bus transport across Galway city and county as part of the Galway Metropolitan Area Transport Strategy (GMATS), with phased planning and approvals underway as of September 2026. The redesigned bus network aims to deliver a "more efficient, higher-frequency system, increasing services by approximately 50%, expanding coverage, and introducing a new 24-hour route."

==== Rail ====
Map of the West of Ireland. Western Rail Corridor ex-GSWR line south of Limerick in green, other ex-MGWR lines are in red.

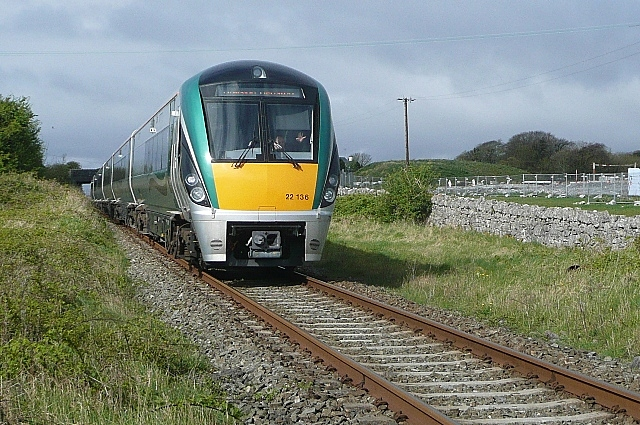
The Galway train

Galway's main railway station is Ceannt Station (Stáisiún Cheannt), which opened in August 1851, and was renamed in honour of Éamonn Ceannt in April 1966.

The Midland Great Western Railway reached Galway in 1851, giving the city a direct main line to its Broadstone Station terminus in Dublin. As the 19th century progressed the rail network in Connacht was expanded, making Galway an important railhead. The nearby town of Athenry became a railway junction, giving Galway links to Ennis, Limerick and the south in 1869 and Sligo and the north in 1894. In 1895 the MGW opened a branch line between Galway and Clifden.

The 20th century brought increasing road competition, and this led the Great Southern Railways to close the Clifden branch in 1935. In the 1970s the state railway authority Córas Iompair Éireann closed the Sligo-Athenry-Ennis line to passenger services. It later closed to freight as well.

Iarnród Éireann, Ireland's national rail operator, currently runs six return passenger services each day between Galway and Dublin Heuston, also serving intermediate stations. Travel time is just under 3 hours. Services on the Galway–Limerick line have now resumed, with around 5–6 trains each way per day.

From Galway railway services along the Western Rail Corridor link the city with Ennis, and Limerick where trains run to Cork via Limerick Junction (for Tipperary, Clonmel and Waterford) and Mallow (for Killarney and Tralee).

==== Road ====
Four national primary roads serve the city: the M6 motorway running east–west (Athlone, Dublin), the M17 motorway running north from the M6 to Tuam, the N63, formerly the N17, connecting Galway with the Northwest (Tuam, Sligo, Donegal Town, Letterkenny and Derry), and the M18 motorway linking Galway to southern towns and cities Gort, Ennis, Shannon Town, Limerick and Cork joining up with The Wild Atlantic Way. In addition, there are plans for a semi-ring road of the city, the Galway City Ring Road. There is also an "Inner City Ring" (Cuar Inmheánach) route that encircles the city centre, most of which is pedestrianised.

Galway is considered the gateway to Connemara and the Gaeltacht, including Mám, An Teach Dóite, Cor na Móna, Ros Muc, Bearna and An Cheathrú Rua. The N59 along the western shore of Lough Corrib and the R337 along the northern shore of Galway Bay both lead to this largely rural and highly scenic region.

==== Waterways ====
The River Corrib is by far the most important waterway in Galway and a number of canals and channels were built above and through the city. The purposes of these to divert and control the water from the river, to harness its power and to provide a navigable route to the sea. Of these, there were two major schemes – one between 1848 and 1858 and the other during the 1950s. The canals provided a power source for Galway and were the location of the first industries in the mid-19th century. The Eglinton Canal provided a navigation from the sea (at the Claddagh Basin) to the navigable part of the river (above the Salmon Weir Bridge). Most of the mills are still used today for various purposes; for instance, the University of Galway still uses a water turbine for electricity generation for their building on Nuns' Island.

Currently, there are four bridges across the Corrib. Following the southward flow of the river these are, from the north: the Quincentennial Bridge, the Salmon Weir Bridge, the William O'Brien Bridge and the Wolfe Tone Bridge. There are plans for a fifth bridge as part of the Galway City Outer Bypass project. The Clare River flows from the North of the County Galway, through Tuam, Claregalway into Lough Corrib.

==== Harbour ====
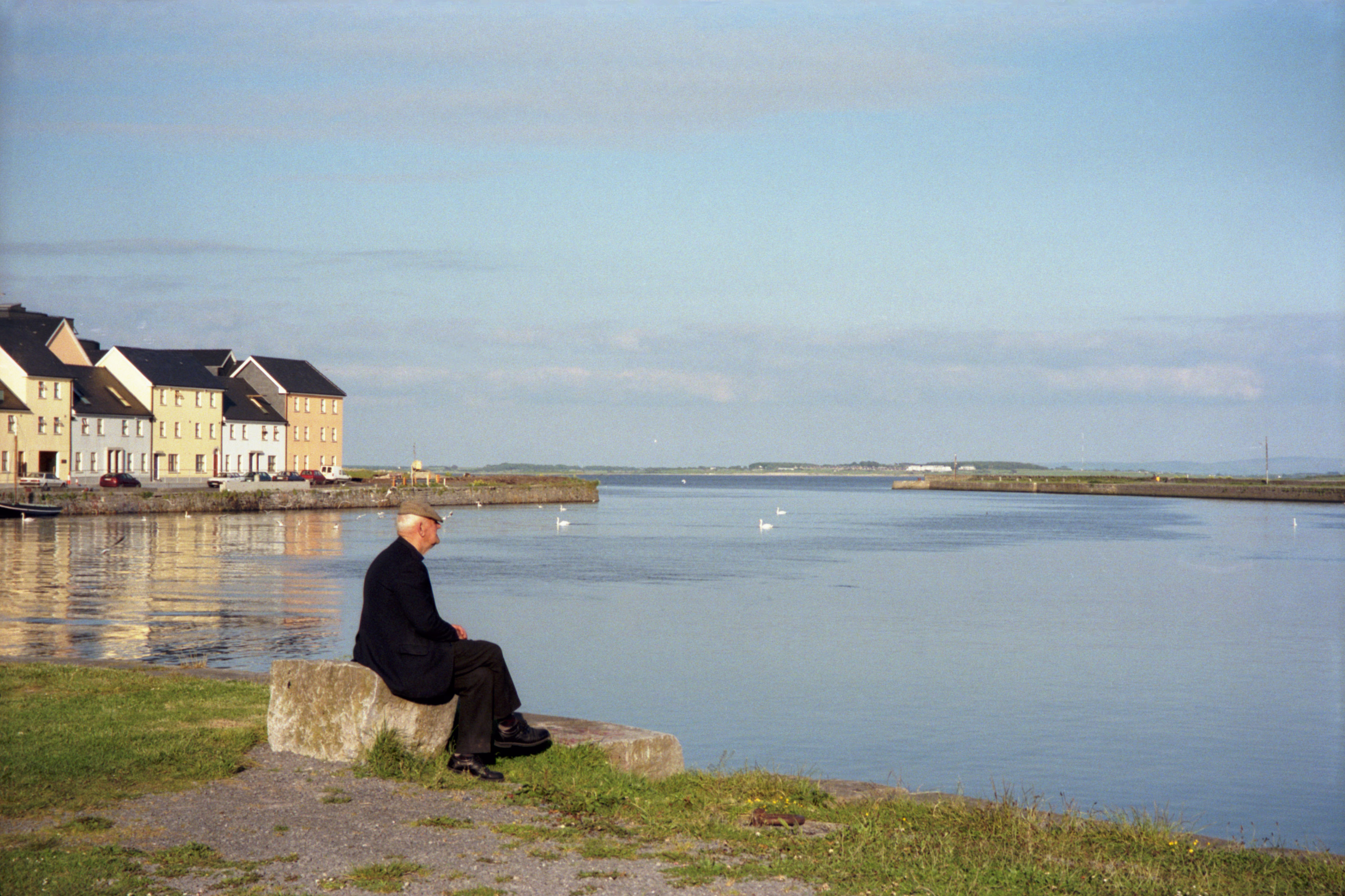
Ballyknow Quay, Claddagh

Galway is the most central port on the West Coast of Ireland in the sheltered eastern corner of Galway Bay. The harbour can be used by vessels up to 10,000 tonnes deadweight (DWT) and the inner dock can accommodate up to 9 vessels at any one time.

Regular passenger ferry and freight services operate between Galway and the tourist destination of the Aran Islands which is home to World Heritage Site Dún Aonghasa. The islands also have regular links with the towns of Rossaveal and Doolin, which are physically closer but far smaller.

Significant work was undertaken in the harbour area in 2009 to accommodate a stopover of the 2008–2009 Volvo Ocean Race. The event returned with the finale of the 2011–2012 Volvo Ocean Race.

==== Walking ====
The city is planned as the start of the E2 European long-distance path, running for 4,850 kilometres (3,010 mi) to Nice, though (as of 2012) the Irish section was incomplete.

== Industry ==
Galway Textile Printers, located on Sandy Road, was the first major industry to come to Galway and became one of the biggest employers in the west of Ireland. Some of those who worked there were specialists who were brought in to help set the factory up, but most employees were local. The mills eventually went out of business in the early 1980s and its former site now hosts several small businesses. Celtrak is an IT and Electronic Engineering company, founded in 2000.

== Education ==
=== Primary and secondary education ===
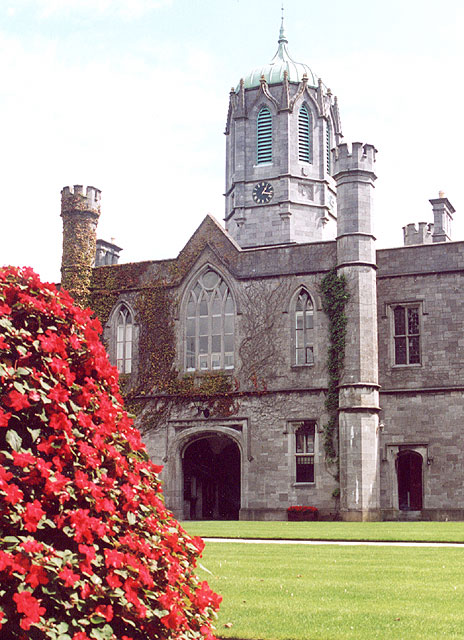
University of Galway

As of 2002, there were 27 primary schools and 11 secondary schools in Galway.

=== Third level ===
There are two university campuses located in the city, University of Galway and the Atlantic Technological University.

The University of Galway was founded in 1845 as Queen's College, Galway, before becoming known as University College, Galway (U.C.G.) and then as the National University of Ireland, Galway. It was renamed "Ollscoil na Gaillimhe – University of Galway" in September 2022. The university. which is divided into several colleges, had an enrollment of over 19,000 in 2024. A new biomedical research building, which houses the Regenerative Medicine Institute (REMEDI), was opened in 2014. Also opened in 2014 were the Hardiman Building and a School of Psychology. The National Institute for Prevention and Cardiovascular Health (NIPC) is an affiliate of the University of Galway.

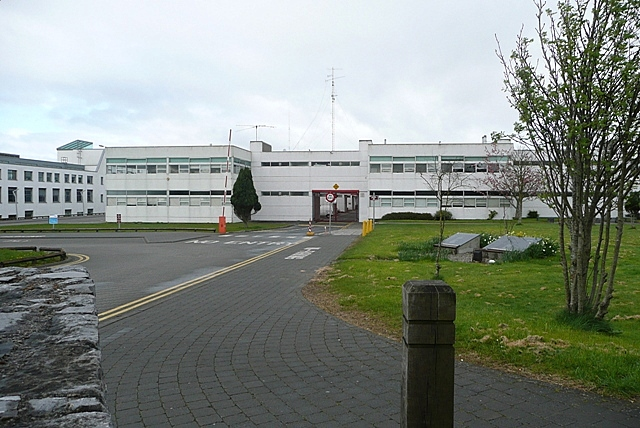
Atlantic Technological University – Galway campus

The Atlantic Technological University (also known as ATU or Atlantic TU; Irish: Ollscoil Teicneolaíochta an Atlantaigh; OTA) was established in 2022 through the merger of Galway Mayo Institute of Technology (GMIT), Sligo Institute of Technology and Letterkenny Institute of Technology. Its administrative headquarters are in Galway. It also has campuses in Castlebar, Letterfrack, Mountbellew, Sligo and Letterkenny. Its Galway campus is based on the Dublin Road in Galway city, overlooking Galway Bay. Four schools of study are located there: the School of Business, the School of Engineering, the School of Science & Computing, and the College of Tourism & Arts.

The Central Applications Office (CAO), the organisation which oversees applications to colleges and universities in Ireland, is also headquartered in the city. A related organisation, the Postgraduate Applications Centre, processes some taught postgraduate courses.

== Health ==
Publicly funded health care and social services are provided in Galway by the HSE (West) division of the Health Services Executive. The main city hospital, Galway University Hospitals, is located on two campuses — University Hospital Galway and Merlin Park University Hospital.

Two private hospitals – The Galway Clinic and the Bon Secours Hospital, Galway – also operate in the city. Galway Hospice provides palliative care for the people of Galway City and County on a homecare, inpatient and daycare basis.

== See also ==
- List of twin towns and sister cities in the Republic of Ireland
