= Eglinton Canal =

Canal in Galway, Ireland

Coordinates: 53°17′N 9°04′W

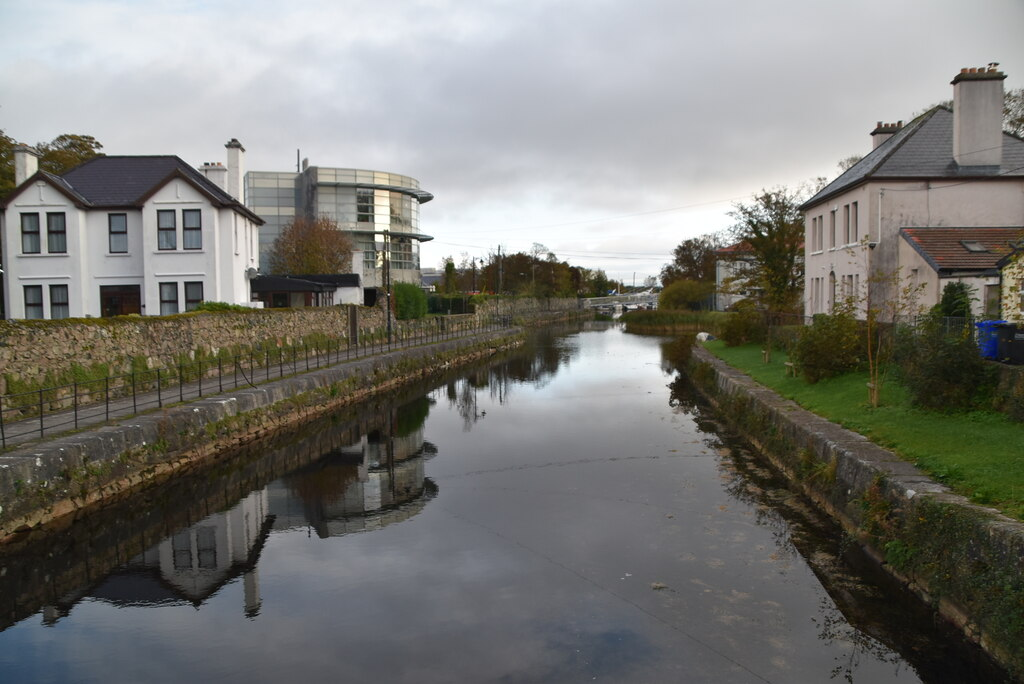
- The Eglinton Canal in Galway
- Interactive map of Eglinton Canal

Specifications
- Locks: 0 (originally 2)
- Status: Partially Closed

History
- Construction began: March 1848
- Date completed: 28 August 1852

Geography
- Start point: River Corrib
- End point: Claddagh Basin

The Eglinton Canal is a canal in Galway City. It was opened in 1852 by Archibald Montgomerie, 13th Earl of Eglinton.

== History ==
In 1822, engineer Alexander Nimmo had suggested that a canal be built to connect the city of Galway to Lough Corrib to increase trade, however the idea for such a canal had been in place since the mayoralty of Andrew Lynch.

=== Construction ===
Construction of the canal began in March 1848 and took four years to complete. Its construction provided employment to workers during Great Famine and it functioned as a famine relief project.

The canal was designed with two locks located at Parkavera and the Claddagh Basin, and five swing bridges. The walls of the canal were constructed of black limestone from the Angliham quarry in Menlo.

The canal was designed to be eight feet deep and forty feet wide at the bottom.

Water was first released into the canal on the 15th of September 1851.

The canal was formally opened on the Lord Lieutenant of Ireland, Lord Eglinton on the 28th of August, 1852.

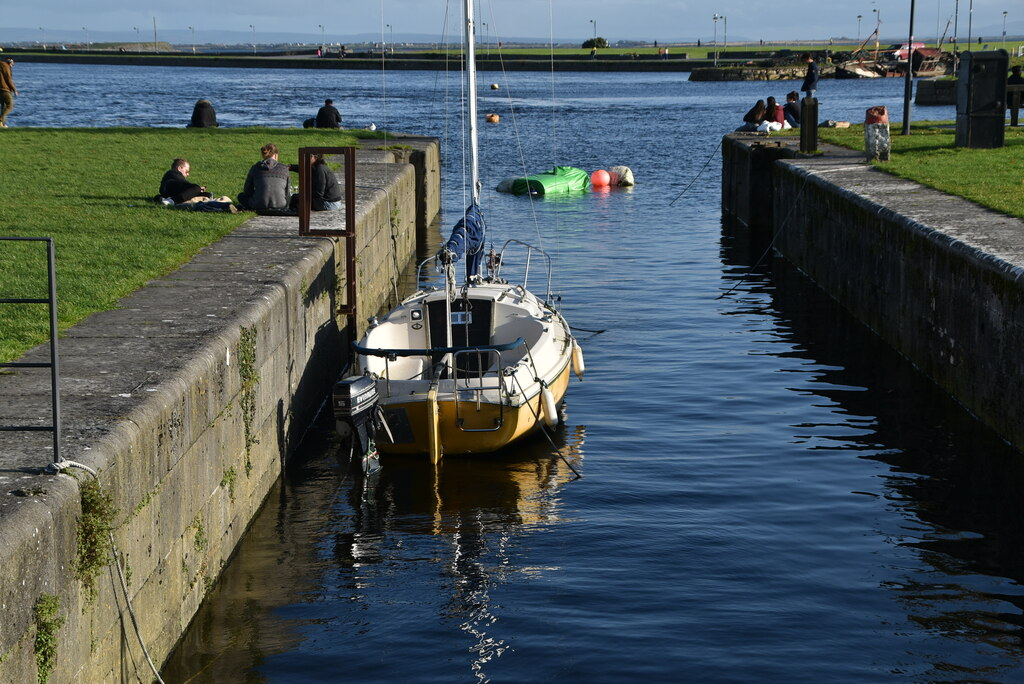
The Eglinton Canal

=== Operation ===
The canal helped to lower water levels during winter floods and improved trade routes in Galway.

In 1880, £370 was collected in tolls.

In 1904, £992 was collected in tolls.

In 1905, £35 was collected in tolls.

In 1916, £1 was collected in tolls.

=== Decline ===
In 1954, the Amo II a yacht, which was owned by Frank Bailey, became the last boat to travel through the canal. Authorities discovered that the five swinging bridges were in a dangerous condition and could not be closed again once opened. As the Amo II was passing through the canal, the swinging bridges were actively being removed. The swinging bridges were replaced with static concrete bridges, making the canal non-navigable to future vessels.

In 1954, historian Maurice Semple fought for the preservation of the canal locks, however, between 2014 and 2017 the Parkavera lock was removed due to safety concerns.

In 1967, historian Peadar O’Dowd established the Galway Waterways Preservation Society, which successfully blocked plans to transform the canal and Claddagh Basin into a road and car park.

== Present day ==
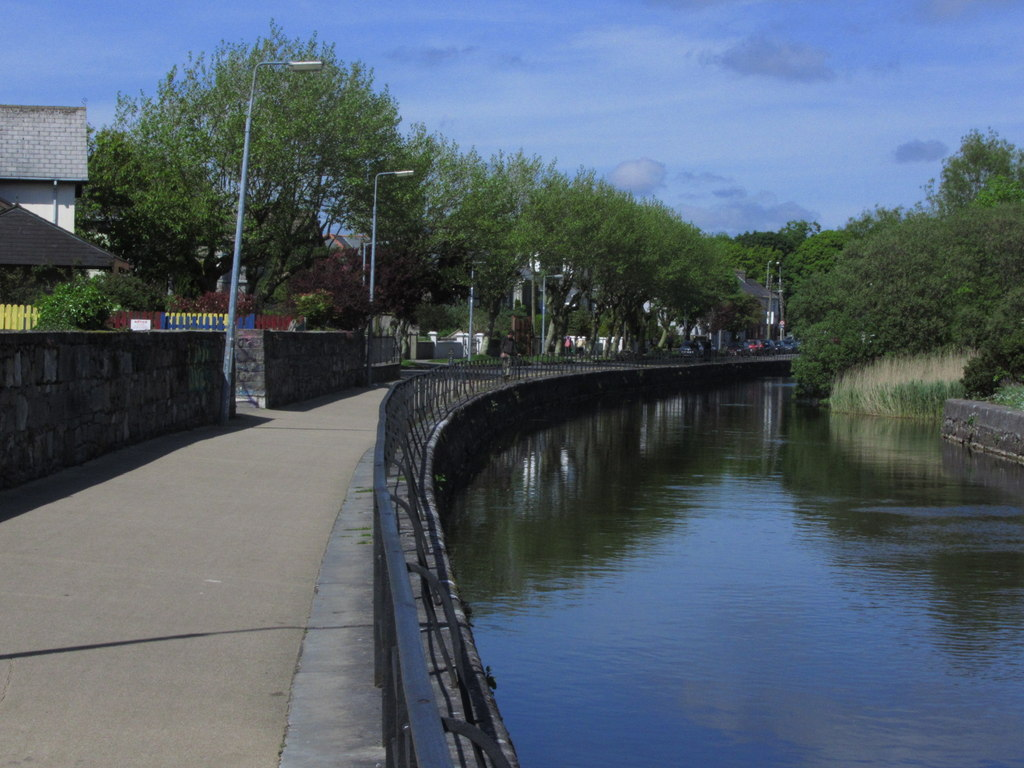
Canal Bank Walk

Today, the canal is used for fishing, kayaking and other recreational activities.

In 2025, Galway City Council was granted €3.36 million by the European Union for a project called WATERWAY. The project aims to instal three small-scale hydropower turbines along Galway canals that would generate electricity for public use by 2029.
