= James Mitchell Geology Museum =

Museum in Galway, Ireland

- Músaem Geolaíocht Shéamuis Uí Mhistéala
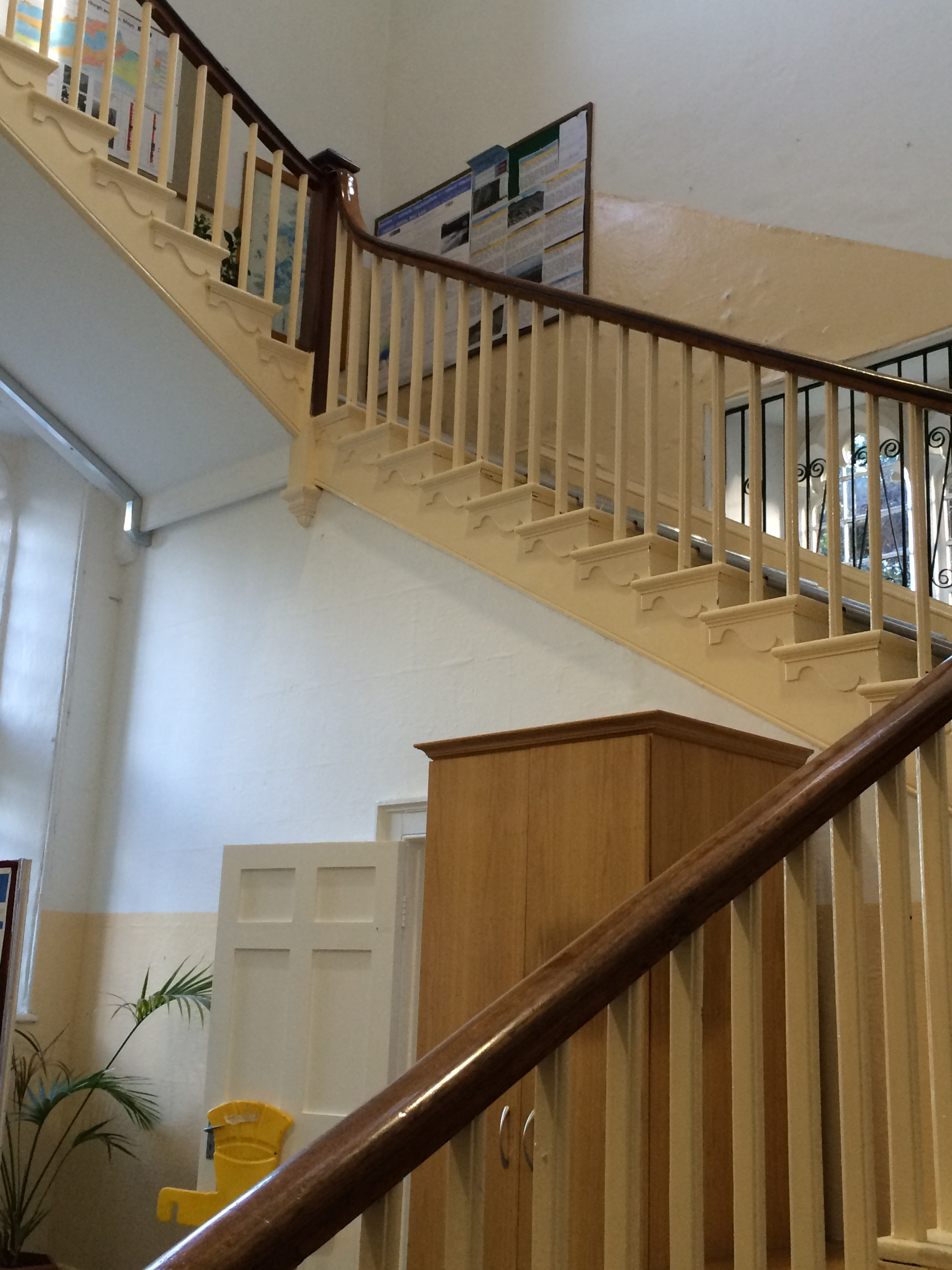
- Staircase ascending towards the James Mitchell Geology Museum

- Location within Ireland
- Established: 1852
- Location: Galway, Ireland
- Coordinates: 53.2773°N 9.0617°W
- Type: Geology
- Collection size: 15,000 specimens
- Curator: Lorna Larkin
- Website: Webpage at the University of Galway

The James Mitchell Geology Museum (Irish: Músaem Geolaíocht Shéamuis Uí Mhistéala) is a geological museum based at the University of Galway in the West of Ireland. It is the only remnant of the university's defunct Natural History Museum. Regarded as "Galway's Hidden Museum", it is located in the university's Main Quad and cane be entered through a staircase in that structure's south-east corner.

== History ==
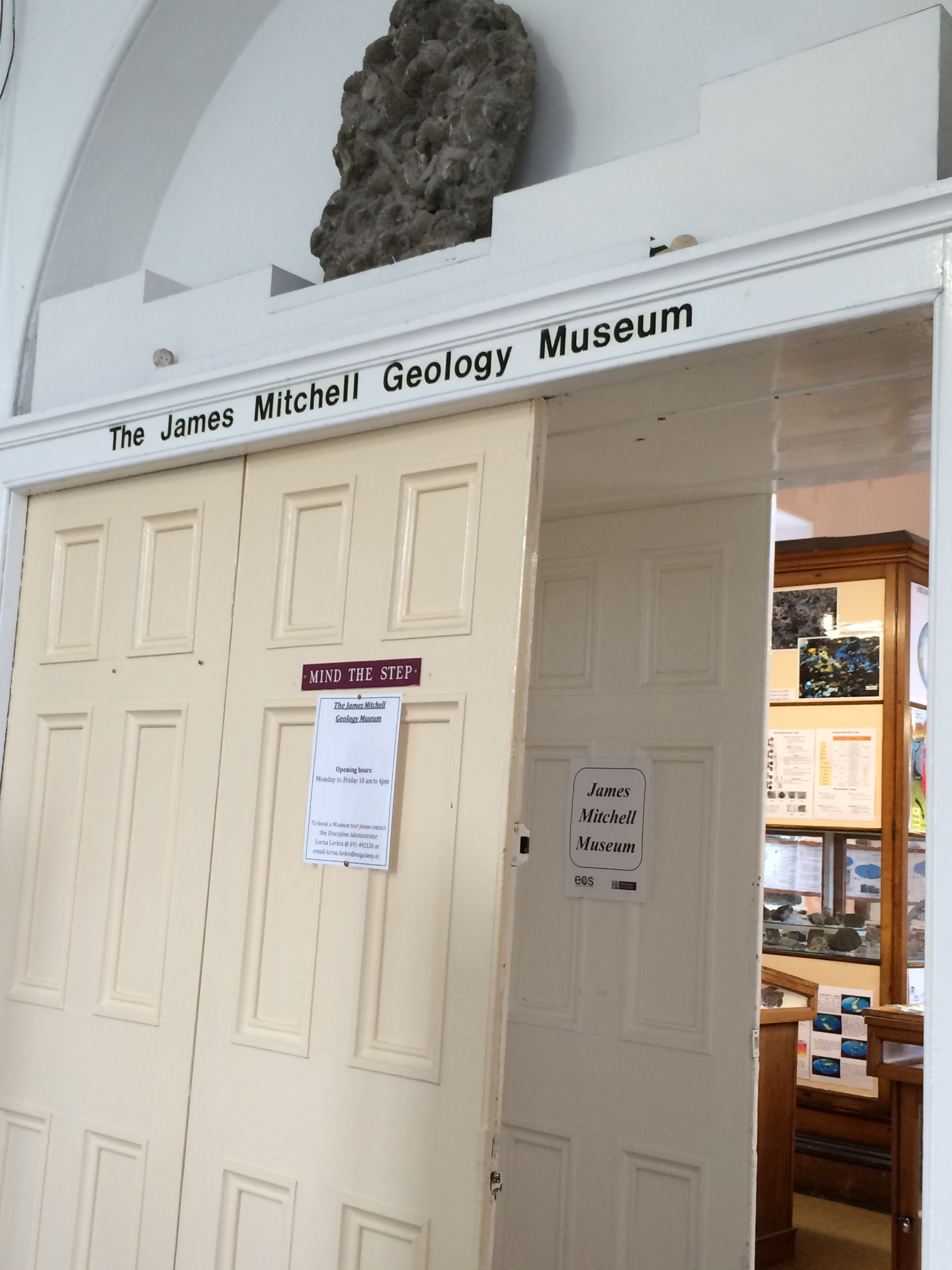
Entrance of the James Mitchell Geology Museum

The museum was founded in 1852 and was based on the collections of William King which included rocks, minerals, and fossils. This collection was supplemented by exchanges, donations, and purchases. The original catalogues compiled by King still extant. In 1883 Richard J. Anderson was appointed as Chair of Natural History, Geology and Mineralogy, and amalgamated the geology and zoological collections to form a Natural History Museum. At this time the collection was housed in five rooms, three given over to zoology and two for the geological and palaeontological collections. Upon the death of Anderson, the chair was split into that of Natural History, and Geology and Mineralogy. During the tenure of Professor Henry Cronshaw, the museum was broken up, with only the geological collections remaining in the present location.

In 1921, Professor James Mitchell became Chair of Geology and Mineralogy, a position he held until 1966. Under Mitchell's tenure the gallery and collections remained intact. The museum was named in honour of Professor Mitchell in 1977, in recognition of his work within the college. Over the years the collections have undergone periods of neglect and restoration. The first refurbishment happened in 1975, with the space cleaned and redecorated, and specimens conserved. There had been no new specimens added to the collections from 1879 until 1975. The museum specimens were conserved again by FAS workers in the 1990s, which included cataloguing the collections into a computer database.

== Contents ==
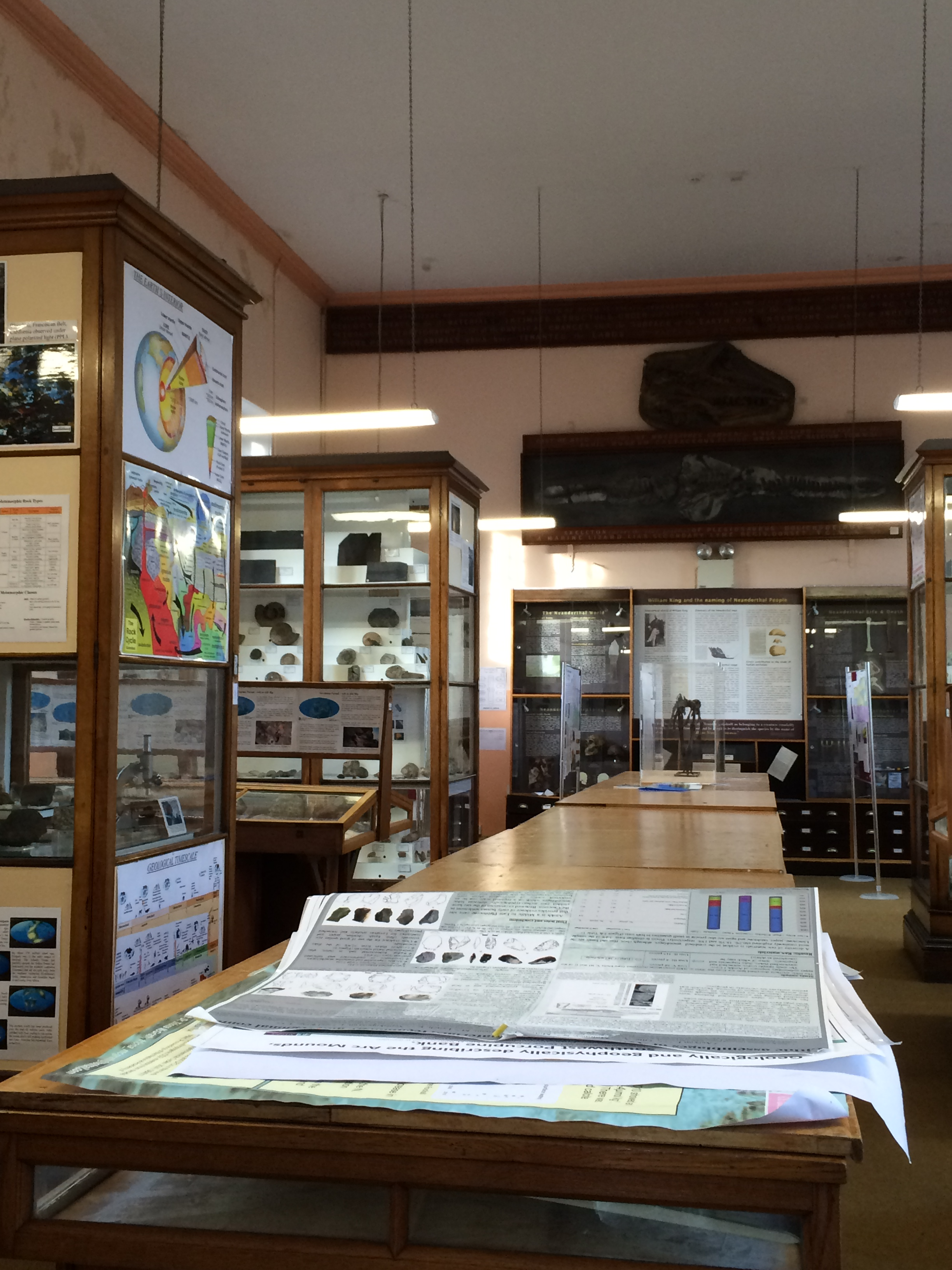
View inside the James Mitchell Geology Museum

The museum is now housed in one room, formerly the Geographical Museum. The museum contains specimens of rocks, minerals and fossils, which primarily serve as an educational resource for the students and staff of the University of Galway, but also primary and secondary school children. There are approximately 5000 fossils and 3000 rocks and minerals within the collections. The collections are of particular interest to the study of Irish geology. Much like the Natural History Museum in Dublin, the gallery is in the Victorian cabinet style, a "museum of a museum". The collections were intended to be representative of international geology, with examples from all around the world. The palaeontological collections include a plesiosaur from Lyme Regis, a German ichthyosaur, and Kiltorcan Devonian flora from County Kilkenny. More recent acquisitions include the Dave McDougall collection, reflecting the current focus on collecting local specimens.
