= Celtrak =

Celtrak Ltd.
- Company type: Private
- Industry: Information Technology, Electronic engineering
- Founded: 2000 by Joe McBreen and Frank Clancy
- Headquarters: Galway, Ireland

Celtrak Ltd. is an Irish IT and electronic engineering company based in Galway which designs, manufactures, and provides operations management services for industry and public authorities across Europe, North America, and the Middle East.

== History ==
Celtrak Limited was founded in 2000 providing fleet management systems and vehicle tracking solutions. The company also undertook wireless technology research in partnership with NUIG. The company has been involved in developing technology to help drivers improve fuel efficiency.

As of 2016, Celtrak was an industrial partner in the Digital Enterprise Research Institute (DERI) LION2 program which conducts research and development into semantic web technologies. Celtrak also contributed to the specialised DERI research group, the Global Sensor Network program, developing semantic solutions for the collection, querying and analysis of large amounts of data available from multiple sensors connected to the internet — sometimes called "sensor dust" or "the internet of things".

Celtrak hosts an Information Exchange Agency for the National Roads Authority's barrier free e-tolling system. The IEA is a back-office system that allows electronic vehicle tags from one operator to pass through the tollgate of another operator.

The company has also been involved in a project to help save lives by providing technology to help prevent lifebuoys from being stolen or vandalised.

The company now focuses on delivering GPS solutions to the civil engineering and utilities space in Ireland, the UK and Europe. Oil distribution companies also use the technology for fleet management.

In early 2008, Celtrak received a €1 million investment from Egis, a French engineering company.

In October 2015, Celtrak was acquired by Thermo King for an undisclosed amount.
