= Computing and Communications Museum of Ireland =

Museum in Ireland

- Established: 2010
- Location: Insight Centre for Data Analytics at the DERI Building, University of Galway
- Coordinates: 53.290°N 9.0744°W
- Type: Computer museum
- Website: ccmireland.com

The Computing and Communications Museum of Ireland was founded in 2010, and is located at the Insight Centre for Data Analytics at the DERI Building, University of Galway.

The museum curates a collection of historical computing machines and artefacts. It is also involved in education and outreach to encourage young people to consider science and engineering careers.
