= Galway Courthouse =

Building in Galway, Ireland

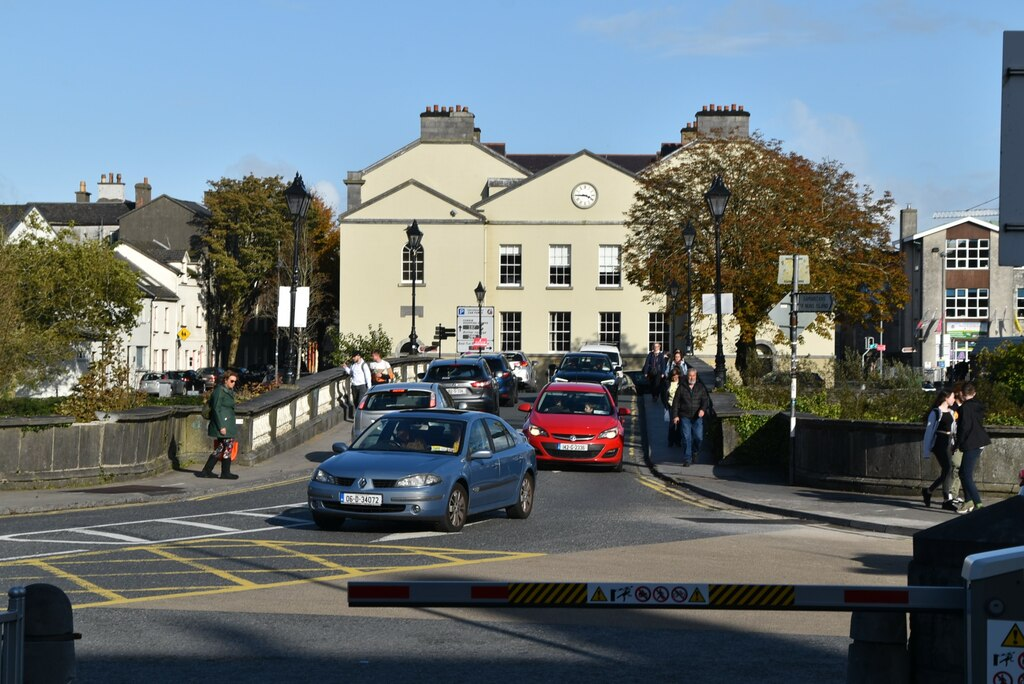
- Galway Courthouse

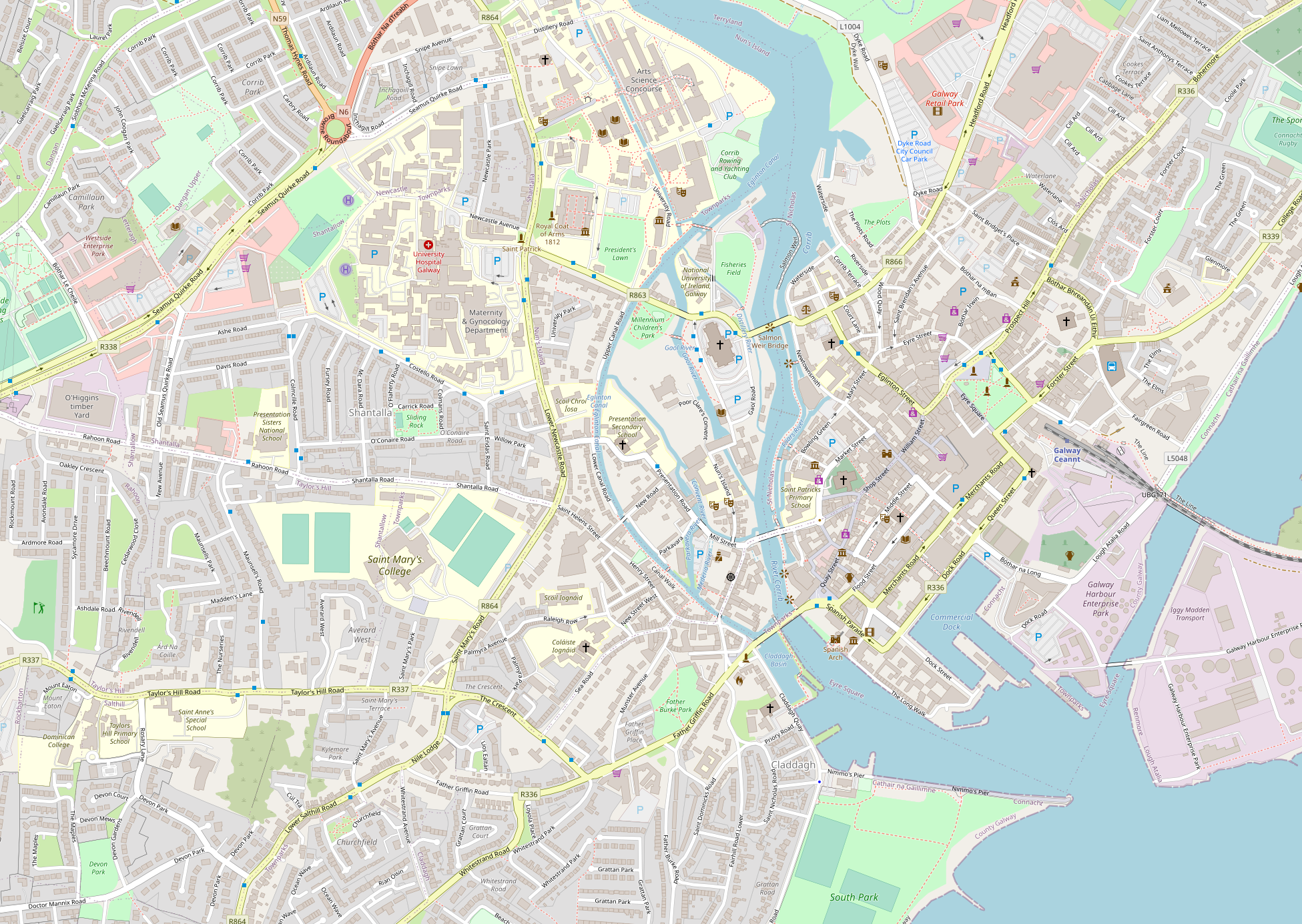
- Location within Galway
- Former names: Galway County Courthouse

General information
- Type: Courthouse
- Architectural style: Neoclassical
- Location: Courthouse Square, Galway, Ireland
- Coordinates: 53.2759°N 9.0548°W
- Construction started: 1812
- Completed: 1 April 1815; 211 years ago

Design and construction
- Architect: Sir Richard Morrison

Website
- www.courts.ie/offices/galway-court-office

Galway Courthouse is a courthouse in the city of Galway, Ireland.

== History ==
Galway Courthouse was designed by Irish architect Sir Richard Morrison. The courthouse replaced the Tholsel, a building that was used located on Shop Street and used as a court and market since 1641. Construction began in 1812 and it opened on 1 April 1815.

The building was designed in the neoclassical style. The facade facing Courthouse Square features a series of columns supporting an entablature.

The Coat of arms of the United Kingdom was mounted on top of the entablature, but was removed during the Irish War of Independence. It is now located behind the Quadrangle at the University of Galway.

In 1818 the Salmon Weir Bridge, designed by Sir Richard's son William Vitruvius Morrison, was built to connect the courthouse and Galway Gaol so that prisoners could be easily transported between the two buildings.
