= Tigh Neachtáin =

Pub and music venue in Galway, Ireland

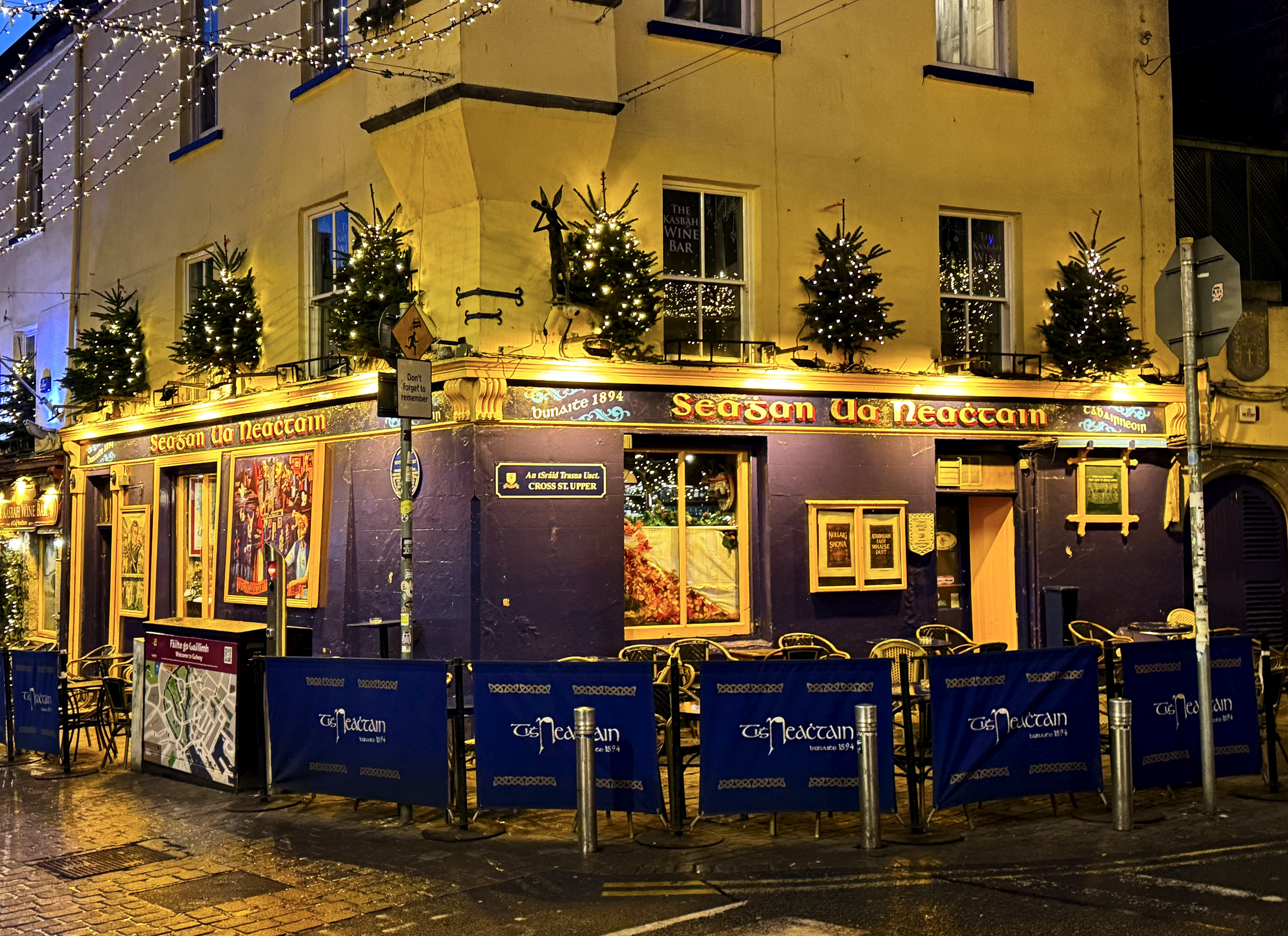
- The pub as it appeared in 2026
- Interactive map of Tigh Neachtáin

Restaurant information
- Established: 1894; 132 years ago
- Owner: Jimmy Maguire
- Food type: Irish pub
- Location: Cross Street, Galway City, County Galway, Ireland
- Coordinates: 53.27141517885443°N 9.053977560159316°W
- Website: www.tighneachtain.com

Tigh Neachtáin (English: Naughton's Pub) is a pub located in Galway City in Ireland. The pub is located on the corner of Quay Street and Cross Street, close to Shop Street, the main pedestrian thoroughfare of the city. It was established in 1894, and was formerly the home of animal rights activist Richard Martin.

== History ==
The pub was opened in 1894. Prior to this, the building served as the home of well-known animal rights activist Richard Martin, who founded the original Society for the Prevention of Cruelty to Animals. Martin also belonged to one of the original 14 Tribes of Galway, a collection of powerful merchant families central to Galway's development from the 13th – 19th centuries.

During the Irish War of Independence, the building was gunned by the Black and Tans, a British paramilitary group, as they objected to the family name being displayed in the Irish language on its storefront.

In 2020, the property of the pub was purchased by Irish property magnate Louis Fitzgerald, with the original tenants remaining in place.

The pub has been listed as one of the best in Ireland several times: In 2008, it was included in a list of the 10 best traditional pubs by The Guardian. In 2020, an article in The Sunday Times named it among Ireland's 50 best pubs, and in 2022 Lonely Planet included it in a list of 20 of the best pubs in Ireland. The bar also serves food prepared in the adjacent Kasbah Wine Bar, which received a positive review in The Irish Times.
