= Edward 'Doc' Byrne =

Irish journalist and editor

Edward 'Doc' Byrne was a journalist and newspaper editor, fl. 1880–1884.

A native of Tuam, Byrne was a noted journalist covering the Maamtrasna murder trials, while he was a reporter for The Freeman's Journal. He was present at the execution of Myles Joyce at Galway Gaol in 1882.

The diligence of his activities brought him to the attention of the Dublin Castle administration in Ireland. Queries on Byrne's identity and exact motivations brought about very detailed physical and biographical details from the County Galway in Royal Irish Constabulary. However, the administration found that Byrne had no malicious intentions in his investigations.

He later became an editor of The Freeman's Journal and died after 1900.
