= Togher =

Togher is a common placename in Ireland, deriving from the Irish word "tochar", meaning a causeway. It may refer to:

- Togher, Cork, a suburb of Cork City, Ireland
- Togher, County Louth, a large parish in County Louth, Ireland
- Joe Togher (1898–1974), Irish Republican
