= Galway Gaol =

Prison in Galway, Ireland

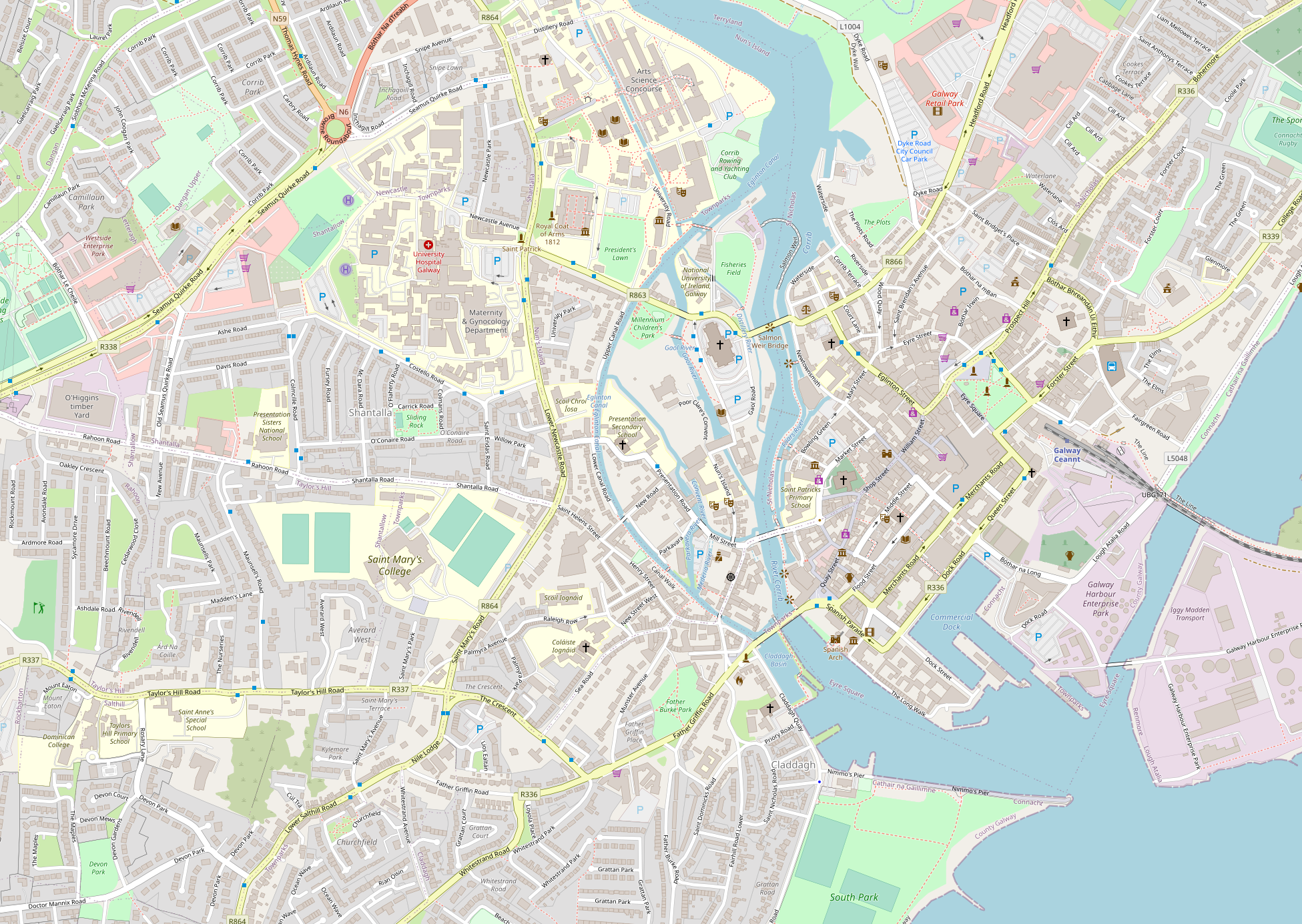
- Location within Galway

General information
- Type: Prison
- Location: Gaol Road, Galway, Ireland
- Coordinates: 53°16′31″N 9°03′27″W
- Construction started: 1807
- Completed: 1810; 216 years ago
- Opened: 27 December 1810
- Closed: 1 May 1939
- Demolished: 1941 (Gaol buildings)

Design and construction
- Architects: Thomas Hardwick; Sir Richard Morrison

Galway Gaol was a prison in the city of Galway, Ireland. It was designed by Thomas Hardwick and constructed in the early 19th century. It consisted of a Town Gaol and a County Gaol, which were merged in 1870. It was closed on 1 May 1939. Demolition began in 1958 and the Galway Cathedral was built in its place.

== History ==
=== Previous gaols ===
==== The Tholsel ====
In 1578, a charter by Elizabeth I granted full power to the Galway Corporation 'to have for ever a gaol within the town'. The original town prison was a small room located under The Tholsel. John Williams was the keeper of this prison.

On 16 March 1603 a letter appointed Cormocke McDermot and his son Henry McDermot to be keepers of the prison once Williams had died. They were to hold this position for life.

Eventually, the Tholsel became too small to accommodate the number of prisoners in the town and was replaced by a new gaol, which was built on Mainguard Street.

==== Mainguard Gaol and Blake's Castle Gaol ====
Mainguard Gaol was constructed on Mainguard Street and was used as the Town Gaol.

In 1686, Blake's Castle opened as the first County Gaol.

In April 1788, John Howard visited both the City and County gaols respectively. According to his report, there were 19 prisoners in total; 7 debtors and 12 felons. He also documented the lack of water and courtyards.

On 21 June 1802, the Galway Corporation ordered that the Mainguard Gaol be torn down in order to widen the street.

=== Construction ===
In 1791 and 1792, Grand Jury Presentments were passed for the construction of a more spacious prison. On 15 April 1802, the Galway County Gaol Act 1802 was passed. This act appointed a board of commissioners to oversee the construction of the county gaol.

At a meeting of the commissioners on 2 April 1807, the commissioners recommended that the Galway County Gaol Act 1802 be amended to allow for the construction of a Town Gaol and bridge. On 13 August 1807, the Galway County Gaol and Sessions House Act 1807 was passed.

Thomas Hardwick was the official architect for the project, and his design was based on the Gloucester Gaol. The foundation stone of the town gaol was laid in 1807. Between 1808 and 1809, the prison was constructed under the supervision of Sir Richard Morrison and was completed in 1810.

The County Gaol was two storeys tall and held 180 prisoners. It was constructed entirely of stone and iron. This Gaol consisted of eight wards; one of which was used as a hospital. The Town Gaol was three storeys tall and had a basement which housed the keeper and his family. The cells were located on the ground floor, and the first floor was used for solitary confinement.

=== Operation ===
The Galway Town and County Gaols formally opened on 27 December 1810 and prisoners were transferred from the old gaols to the new gaols.

On 29 June 1818, construction of the Salmon Weir Bridge began. Its purpose was to connect the Town Courthouse and County Courthouse to their respective gaols. It was opened in October 1819.

The Gaols Act 1823 mandated sex segregated prisons and female warders for female prisoners.

In 1832, Sir William Gosset submitted a contract to expand the prison, which was approved by architect William Murray in the Architects Office, Dublin Castle.

In 1870, the Town Gaol and County Gaols were merged.

=== Closure and demolition ===
The Galway Prison Closing Order, 1939, was signed by Minister for Justice Patrick Ruttledge, and the gaol was closed on 1 May 1939.

In 1940, Bishop Michael Browne suggested that it would be an ideal site for a cathedral.

On 15 March 1941, Chairman of the Galway Corporation, Eamon Corbett formally handed the keys of the Galway Gaol to Bishop Michael Browne for a sum of £10. Later in 1941, the gaol buildings were demolished.

In 1949, architect John J Robinson was hired to design the Galway Cathedral.

On 27 October 1957, the site on which the new cathedral would be built, was blessed by the Archbishop of Armagh, John D'Alton. In 1958, John Sisk Ltd. began construction of the Galway Cathedral. During the construction, the gaol walls and gatehouse were kept and only demolished once the cathedral was completed. The cathedral opened in 1965.

Today, the key to a rear door of Galway Gaol is on display in the Galway City Museum.

Rubble from the site was later used to fill in quarry pits and quarry lakes at Shantalla from the early 20th-century granite quarrying activities there.

== Prisoners and executions ==
A list of former prisoners and people executed in the prison. This is not an exhaustive list.

=== Former prisoners ===
- Tomás Bairéad
- Edward 'Doc' Byrne
- Geraldine Plunkett Dillon, 28 March 1921, sentenced to six months (released early)
- Ada English
- John Hynes, escaped 29 November 1892
- Martin King
- William O'Brien
- Samuel Parkes (VC), 20 November 1848 – 15 January 1849, sentenced to 56 days. Additional 11 days in solitary confinement
- Joe Togher

=== Executions ===
- Pat Casey,1882
- John Downey, 1885, hanged for the murder of John Moylan
- Pat Joyce, 1882
- Thomas Keely, April 1902, hanged for the murder of his landlady (Last Execution)
- Neddy Lohan, hanged
- Maolra Seoighe, 1882, wrongfully convicted and hanged for the Maamtrasna murders
- Patrick Walsh, 22 September 1882, hanged for the Murders of Martin and John Lydon

== See also ==
- List of miscarriage of justice cases
- List of members of the Oireachtas imprisoned during the Irish revolutionary period
- Prisons in Ireland
