= Irish Independent =

Irish daily newspaper

- Irish Independent front page on 24 November 2005
- Type: Daily newspaper
- Format: Compact
- Owner(s): Mediahuis Ireland, a subsidiary of Mediahuis
- Editor: Cormac Bourke
- Founded: January 1905; 121 years ago (replaced Daily Irish Independent)
- Headquarters: Talbot Street, Dublin, Ireland
- Circulation: 36,000
- ISSN: 0021-1222
- Website: independent.ie

The Irish Independent is an Irish daily newspaper and online publication which is owned by Mediahuis Ireland, a subsidiary of Mediahuis.

The newspaper version often includes glossy magazines.

Traditionally a broadsheet newspaper, it introduced an additional compact size in 2004. Further, in December 2012 (following billionaire Denis O'Brien's takeover) it was announced that the newspaper would become compact only.

== History ==
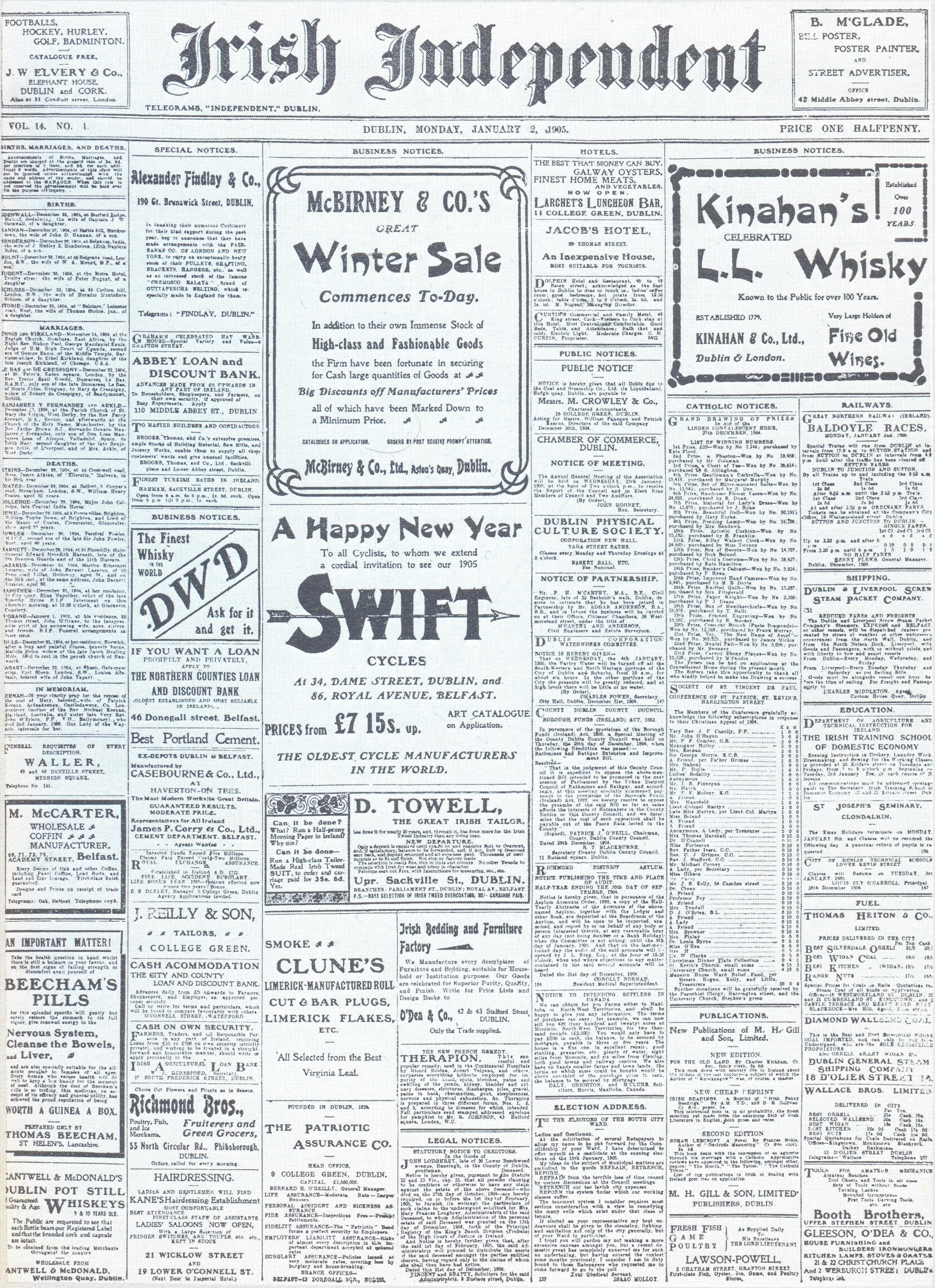
First issue of the Irish Independent

=== Murphy and family (1905–1973) ===
Masthead of the Freeman's Journal, founded 1763, which merged with the Irish Independent in 1924

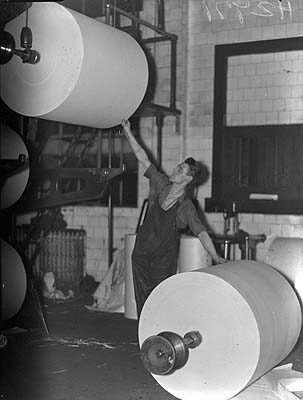
Independent Newspapers in January 1935

The Irish Independent was formed in 1905 as the direct successor to The Irish Daily Independent and Daily Nation, an 1890s' pro-Parnellite newspaper. It was launched by William Martin Murphy, a controversial Irish nationalist businessman, staunch anti-Parnellite and fellow townsman of Parnell's most venomous opponent, Timothy Michael Healy from Bantry. The first issue of the Irish Independent, published 2 January 1905, was marked as "Vol. 14. No. 1".

During the 1913 Lockout of workers, in which Murphy was the leading figure among the employers, the Irish Independent vigorously sided with its owner's interests, publishing news reports and opinion pieces hostile to the strikers, expressing confidence in the unions' defeat and launching personal attacks on the leader of the strikers, James Larkin. The Irish Independent described the 1916 Easter Rising as "insane and criminal" and famously called for the shooting of its leaders. In December 1919, during the Irish War of Independence, a group of twenty IRA men destroyed the printing works of the paper, angered at its criticism of the Irish Republican Army's attacks on members of the Dublin Metropolitan Police and British government officials. In 1924, the traditional nationalist newspaper, the Freeman's Journal, merged with the Irish Independent. Until October 1986 the paper's masthead over the editorial contained the words "incorporating the Freeman's Journal".

For most of its history, the Irish Independent (also called simply the Independent or more colloquially, the Indo) was seen as a nationalist, Catholic, anti-Communist, newspaper, which gave its political allegiance to the Pro-Treaty party Cumann na nGaedheal and later its successor party, Fine Gael. During the Spanish Civil War, the Irish Independent's coverage was strongly pro-Franco: the paper criticised the De Valera government for not intervening on behalf of the Spanish Nationalists.

In 1961, the harp became a symbol of the Irish Independent. It originally appeared in black but was changed to green in 1972.

=== O'Reilly (1973–2012) ===
In the 1970s, former Heinz chairman Tony O'Reilly took over the Irish Independent. Under his leadership, it became a more market liberal newspaper and economic right-wing. By the mid-nineties its allegiance to Fine Gael had ended. In the 1997 general election, it endorsed Fianna Fáil under a front-page editorial, entitled "It's Payback Time". While it suggested its headline referred to the fact that the election offered a chance to "pay back" politicians for their failings, its opponents suggested that the "payback" actually referred to its chance to get revenge for the refusal of the Rainbow Coalition to award the company a mobile phone licence.

In late 2004, Independent Newspapers moved from their traditional home in Middle Abbey Street to a new office, Independent House in Talbot Street, with the printing facilities already relocated to the Citywest business park near Tallaght.

On 27 September 2005, a fortnight after the paper published its centenary edition, it was announced that editor Vinnie Doyle would step down after 24 years in the position. He was replaced by Gerry O'Regan, who had until then been editor of the Irish Independent's sister paper, the Evening Herald. The newspaper's previous editor Stephen Rae was also formerly editor of the Evening Herald and was appointed editor in September 2012. Fionnan Sheahan was appointed editor in January 2015.

=== O'Brien (2012–2019) ===
Billionaire Denis O'Brien acquired a majority shareholding of the Irish Independent's parent company INM in May 2012.

=== Mediahuis (2019–present) ===
In July 2019 the takeover of INM by Belgian media group Mediahuis was approved by the Irish High Court.

From 11 February 2020, it was announced that Independent.ie content would go behind a paywall.

==== Digital archives ====
The Irish Independent is available on the Irish Newspaper Archives, in black-and-white microfilm up to 2004, in colour since 2005. It is also archived up to 2009 online on the British Newspaper Archive website. Also on Newspapers.com.

== New Irish Writing and Hennessy Award ==
Since 2011, the Irish Independent has been the home of New Irish Writing (and its associated Hennessy Award), which was originally established by David Marcus in 1969 in the Irish Press and appeared in the Sunday Tribune from 1988 to 2011. The New Irish Writing Page is "the longest-running creative writing feature of its kind in any Irish or British newspaper".

== Exam Brief ==
The Irish Independent, in co-operation with the Institute of Education, produces Exam Brief, a yearly six-part supplement dedicated to preparation for Leaving and Junior Certificate exams. This supplement is published in February, March and April each year.

== Related papers and concerns ==
See Independent News & Media article for newspapers and media assets in the wider group.

== Print circulation ==
Average print circulation was approximately 165,000 copies per issue in 1999, and had dropped to approximately 100,000 by 2016.

Year (period)	Average circulation per issue
1999 (January to July)	165,650
2006 (January to December)	162,582
2009 (July to December)	149,906
2012 (January to June)	125,986
2012 (July to December)	123,981
2014 (January to June)	112,383
2016 (January to June)	102,537
2016 (July to December)	97,104
2017 (January to June)	94,502
2017 (July to December)	90,107
2018 (January to June)	87,673
2018 (July to December)	83,900
2023 (March)	36,000

In 2019, Independent News & Media exited the ABC auditing process.
