= Blake's Castle =

- Caisléan an Bhlácaigh
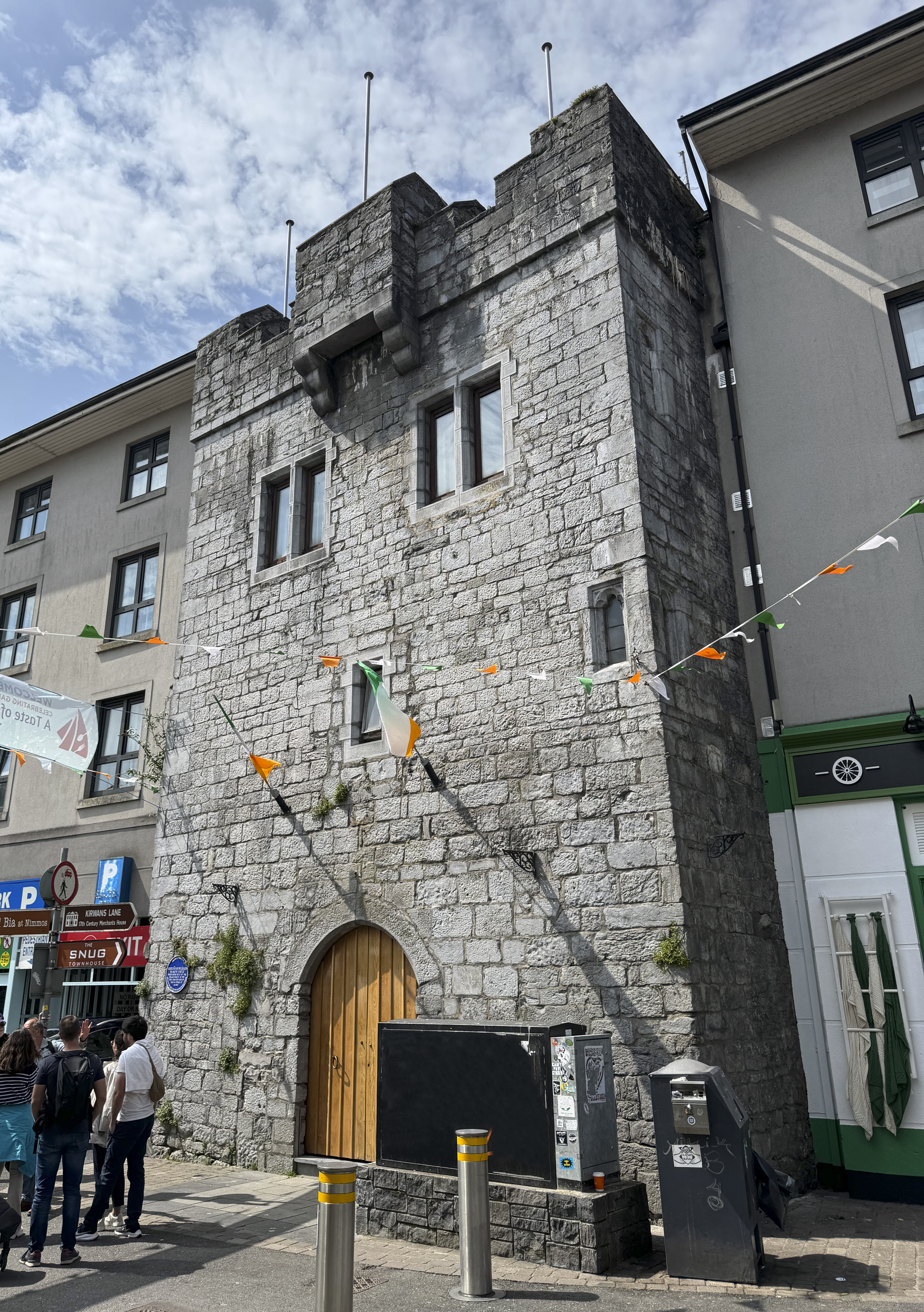
- Blake's Castle

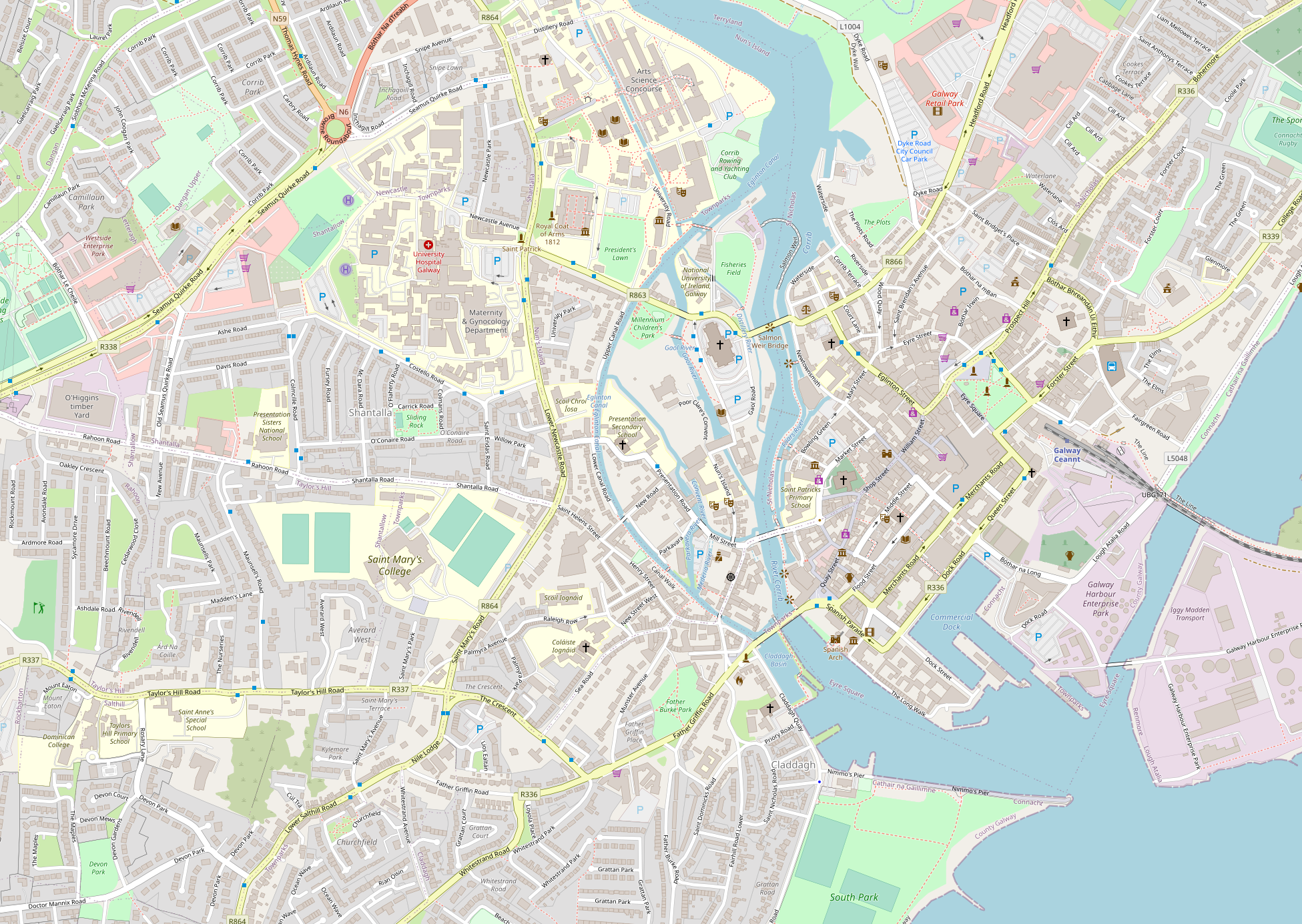
- Location within Galway
- Alternative names: Blake’s Southern Castle

General information
- Location: Quay Street, Galway, Ireland
- Coordinates: 53.2708°N 9.0545°W

Blake's Castle (Irish: Caisléan an Bhlácaigh) is an urban tower house built around 1470. The castle was used as the Galway County Gaol from 1686 to 1810. It is located on Quay Street in Galway City, Ireland.

The castle is one of the two surviving fortified town houses in Galway city owned by the Tribes of Galway, the other being Lynch's Castle.

== History ==
Blake's Castle was built around the year 1470 and originally belonged to the O’Halloran family. It was taken over by the Blake family who fortified it in 1641. The castle became known as Blake’s Southern Castle to distinguish between their William Street Castle, owned by Sir Valentine Blake, 1st Baronet of Menlough.

As a result of the Act for the Settlement of Ireland 1652, the castle was confiscated and given to the Morgan family, but retained the name Blake's Castle.

It was used as the County Gaol from 1686 to 10 December 1810, when it was replaced by a new Galway County Gaol located on the current site of the Galway Cathedral. After its closure as a prison, the castle was used to store corn. It was derelict by the end of the 19th century.

In 1967, the castle was used as a substation by the ESB.

In April 1993, the Jurys Inn hotel, built by the O'Malley Construction Company Ltd. opened. The design of the hotel incorporated the facade of Blake's Castle. Jurys Inn was rebranded to the Leonardo Hotel Galway in 2022.

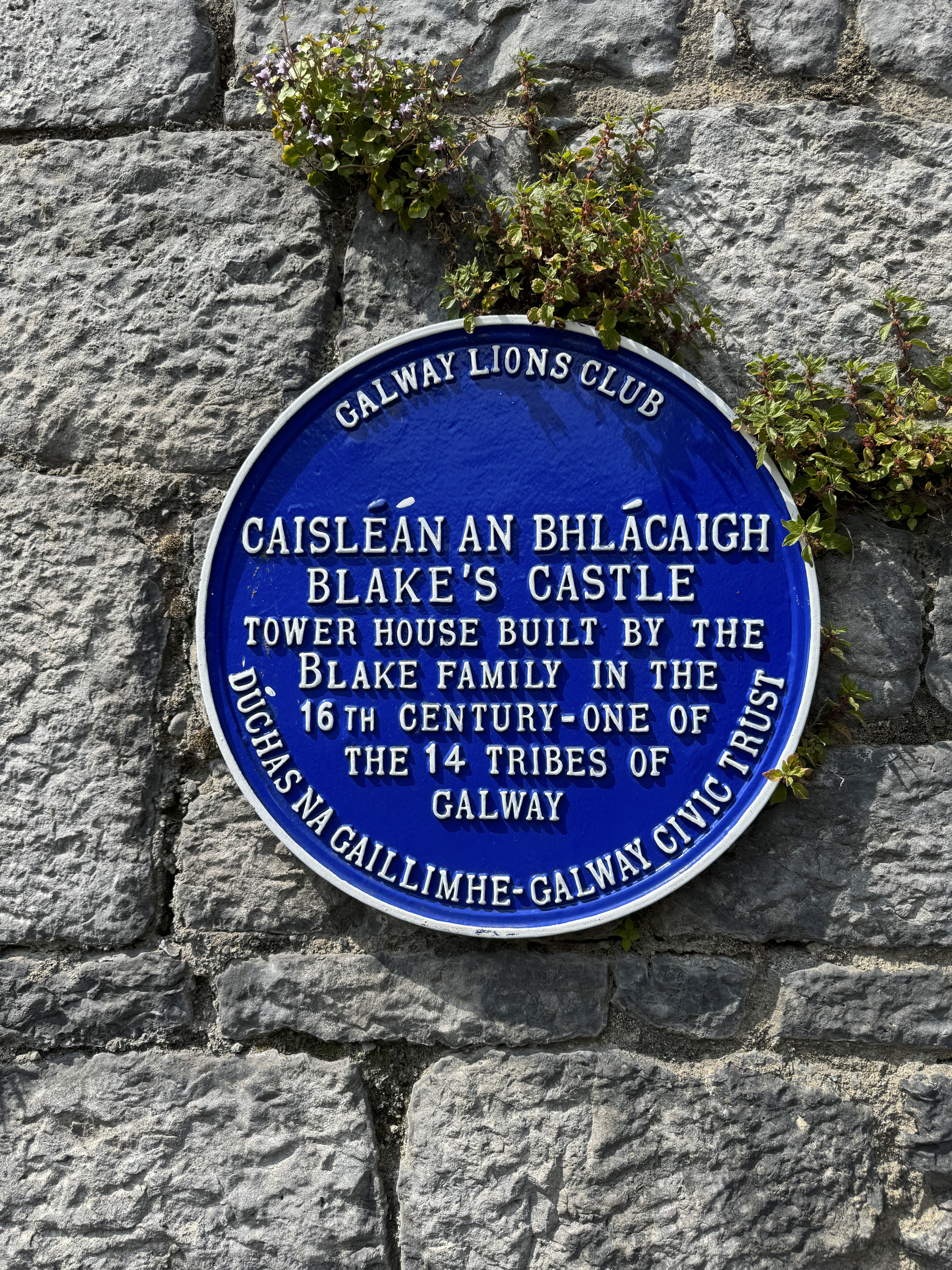
Galway Lions Club and Dúchas na Gaillimhe–Galway Civic Trust plaque

== See also ==
- Blake baronets of Menlough (1622)
- Menlo Castle
- Spanish Arch
