= Daily Irish Independent =

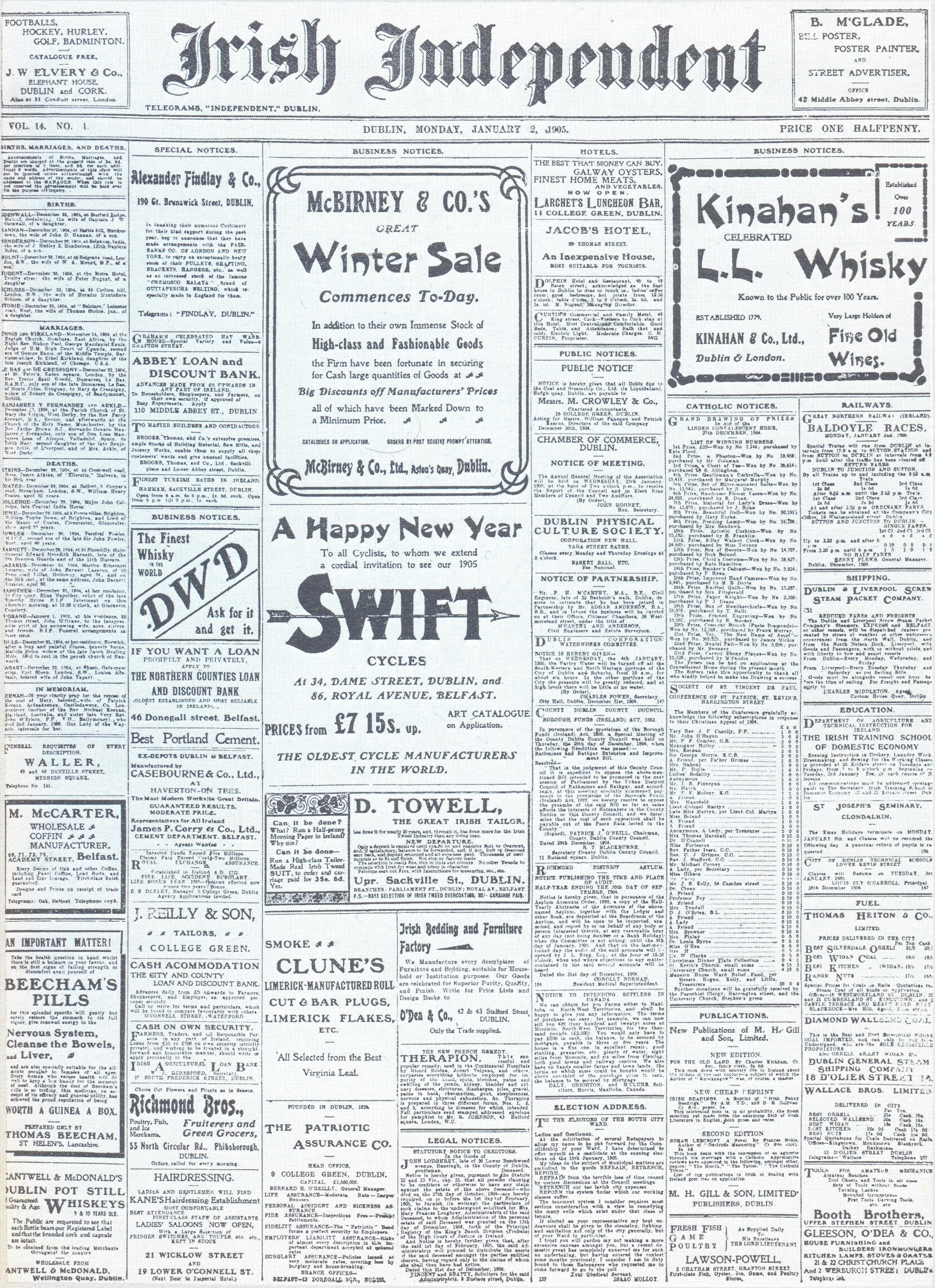
First issue of the Irish Independent 2 January 1905

The Daily Irish Independent was an Irish newspaper launched in the 1890s to promote the pro-Parnellite cause following the split in the Irish Parliamentary Party over Parnell's continuing leadership. The party had split following the revelation that Parnell had been involved in a long-running relationship with Katharine O'Shea, the wife of a fellow MP, and was the father of most of her children.

The leading Irish nationalist newspaper, the Freeman's Journal, sided with the majority anti-Parnellite side. The Daily Irish Independent was launched to promote the cause of the deposed IPP leader.

== Post factions ==
In 1900, the IPP's factions made peace. Following a change of ownership to William Martin Murphy, and in the belief that the healing of wounds removed the need for pro- and anti-Parnellite papers, the paper was reinvented as the Irish Independent, with Tim Harrington as editor. The new paper was launched on 2 January 1905.
