= Freeman's Journal =

Former newspaper in Ireland

- Type: Daily newspaper
- Format: Broadsheet
- Founder: Charles Lucas
- Editor: John Turner Fearon
- Founded: 1763
- Ceased publication: 1924
- Political alignment: Moderate Irish nationalist
- Headquarters: 4-6 Princes Street North, Dublin 1 (Destroyed during the Easter Rising); 7-8 Townsend Street, Dublin 2; 27 Westmoreland Street, Dublin 2

The Freeman's Journal, which was published continuously in Dublin from 1763 to 1924, was in the nineteenth century Ireland's leading nationalist newspaper.

== History ==
=== Patriot journal ===
It was founded in 1763 by Charles Lucas and was identified with radical 18th-century Protestant patriot politicians Henry Grattan and Henry Flood. This changed from 1784 when it passed to Francis Higgins (better known as the "Sham Squire") and took a more unionist and pro-Dublin Castle administration view. Higgins is mentioned in the Secret Service Money Book as having been paid £1,000 for supplying information which led to Lord Edward FitzGerald's arrest.

=== Voice of constitutional nationalism ===
In the 19th century it became more nationalist in tone, particularly under the control and inspiration of Sir John Gray (1815–75).

The Journal, as it was widely known as, was the leading newspaper in Ireland throughout the 19th century. Contemporary sources record it being read to the largely illiterate population by priests and local teachers gathering in homes. It was mentioned in contemporary literature and was seen as symbolising Irish newspapers for most of its time. By the 1880s it had become the primary media supporter of Charles Stewart Parnell and the Irish Parliamentary Party (IPP). The weekend edition of the paper was known as The Weekly Freeman, which began featuring large format political cartoons in the 1870s.

It was challenged on all sides by rivals. On the nationalist side some preferred The Nation founded by Thomas Davis while others, including radical supporters of Parnell, read the United Irishman. The Anglo-Irish establishment in contrast read the historically Irish unionist The Irish Times. With the split in the IPP over Parnell's relationship with Katharine O'Shea, its readership split too. While The Journal in September 1891 eventually went with the majority in opposing Parnell, a minority moved to read the Daily Irish Independent. It was also challenged from the turn of the century by William O'Brien's Irish People and the Cork Free Press. With Thomas Sexton becoming chairman of the Board of Directors (1893–1911), the Journal languished under his spartanic management. The paper had its licence suspended for a time in 1919 under the Defence of the Realm Act regulation 27 after publishing material critical of the Dublin Metropolitan Police.

=== Superseded by the Irish Independent ===
The collapse of the IPP in 1918, and the electoral success of Sinn Féin, saw a more radical nationalism appear that increasingly was out of step with the moderation of the Journal. The Irish Independent, the successor to the Daily Irish Independent, was more aggressively marketed. Just prior to the outbreak of the Irish Civil War in March 1922, the Freeman's Journal printing machinery was destroyed by Anti-Treaty IRA men under Rory O'Connor for its support of the Anglo-Irish Treaty. It did not resume publication until after the outbreak of civil war, when the Irish Free State re-asserted its authority over the country.

The Freeman's Journal ceased publication in 1924, when it was merged with the Irish Independent. Until the 1990s, the Irish Independent included the words 'Incorporating the Freeman's Journal' in its mast-head over its editorials.

=== Offices ===
The newspaper's head office was located at 4-6 Prince Street North until its destruction during the Easter Rising of 1916.

After its destruction, the newspaper refurbished buildings at 6-8 Townsend Street incorporating the former Dublin Coffee Palace however these were ultimately ransacked by anti-treaty forces in March 1922.

It also developed other alternative offices at 27 Westmoreland Street in 1917 while carrying out extensive renovations there in 1921–22.

== In fiction ==
James Joyce drew on his recollection of his visits to the Freeman's office in 1909 in his novel Ulysses. As the place of Leopold Bloom's employment, the depiction of the paper's offices in the Aeolus chapter has been deemed "an authentic portrait" at a time when the newspaper was "moribund – the Irish Independent having supplanted it as the most popular daily newspaper in Dublin." Its decline is reflected in "the anxious question posed in Aeolus about the Freeman’s editor, WH Brayden: 'But can he save the circulation?'"

== Leading proprietors, editors and contributors ==
- Matthias McDonnell Bodkin
- Henry Brooke
- Edward 'Doc' Byrne
- Wilson Gray
- Sir John Gray
- Charles Lucas
- James Winder Good
- William O'Brien
- Thomas Sexton

== See also ==
- Pádraig Ó Domhnaill
