= Charlie Byrne's Bookshop =

Bookshop in Galway, Ireland

Coordinates: 53.2718°N 9.0529°W

- Industry: Bookshop
- Founded: Munster Avenue, Galway, 1989; 37 years ago
- Founder: Charlie Byrne
- Headquarters: Middle Street, Galway, Ireland
- Key people: Charlie Byrne (owner and founder); Vinny Browne (manager)
- Products: Books
- Website: charliebyrne.ie

Charlie Byrne's is a bookshop located in the Cornstore Mall on Middle Street in Galway, close to Shop Street and the Augustinian Church. As of 2019, it reportedly contained more than 100,000 new and used books. It is a popular venue for book launches. An article on RTÉ.ie described it as a "cultural reference point in the city", and The Irish Times has described it as "the destination bookshop in Galway city".

== History ==
Charlie Byrne's was founded in 1989, operating initially from a market stall in Munster Avenue and then moving to its first premises in Dominick Street later that year. Three years later it moved to its second premises and its first of two on Middle Street. In 1996, it moved across the road to its third premises overall and second on Middle Street, the same one from which it operates today. It continued to expand and by the early 2000s it had a 2000 square foot premises; it has by now largely taken over the Cornstore Mall.

== Style ==
Charlie Byrne's is spread across multiple floors and six rooms of the Cornstore.

It avails of publisher's overstock to provide new books at a reduced price. It also sources books from university presses and foreign publishers to provide titles not otherwise often found in Irish bookshops. It typically only sells new full-priced books if the writer is local, or if the topic relates to Ireland. It has a warehouse in which it stores tens of thousands of additional books.

Its annual pop-up bookshop at the Town Hall Theatre during the Cúirt International Festival of Literature is another feature; visiting writers such as Edna O'Brien, John Banville, Seamus Heaney, Michael Longley, Ruth Padel, Manuel Rivas and Allen Ginsberg are among those to have spent hours signing books at the Cúirt shop's antique desk.

== Awards ==
Charlie Byrne's was named "Best Bookshop in Ireland 2013-14" in The Irish Times's Best Shops in Ireland Competition. It was also named Ireland's Best Independent Bookshop as part of the British and Irish Book Awards in 2019.
