= Murders of Martin and John Lydon =

The murders of John Lydon (died 24 April 1881) and his son Martin Lydon (died 21 May 1881) occurred in Letterfrack, County Galway, Ireland during the Irish Land War.

== Background ==
The Land War was a period of huge unrest and violence in Ireland, with crime particularly prevalent in County Galway. Dozens of murders occurred, all concerning tenants' rights and ownership of land.

Before his murder, John Lydon had been hired to herd cattle on land in Connemara. According to newspaper accounts, Stephen Walsh had previously rented out the land for £500, but was removed after a dispute with the landowner, who replaced him with John Lydon.

== The murders ==
John Lydon and his son, Martin, 20, were attacked at their home at Bannogaes, Letterfrack on the night of Sunday, 24 April 1881. At about 10 or 11 at night, seven or eight men rushed into their cabin, where they punched, beat, and kicked the Lydons. The two men were then dragged outside into the road and shot with pistols "while Lydon's wife, terror-stricken, stood at the window expecting that she and her young children would share their fate."

John was killed outright but Martin (who had been shot four times including through the lung) lived long enough to identify one of the killers as Patrick Walsh, the son of Stephen Walsh. He stated this to a Constable on 25 April, and also gave a sworn deposition to a magistrate who visited his bedside. He died on 21 May, and an inquest was held on 24 May by Coroner Charles Cottingham.

== Trial of Patrick Walsh ==
The murders shocked many because John Lydon "was not a process-server or agent, or a man who had taken a farm from which another had been evicted. He was a caretaker of cattle on a large farm, which was reclaimed some years earlier at the expense of Mr. Graham, the owner, who borrowed money for the purpose from the Board of Works, and by means of it afforded employment to people in the district."

On the night of 21 May 1881, the house of Michael Lydon (John Lydon's nephew), herd for Mr. McDonnell, Letterfrack, and agent to Francis Graham of Fermanagh, "was burned to the ground. Since the murder of his uncle, his family did not sleep in their house, which is situated in a remote mountain glen. Lyden [sic] and his wife used to go there every morning to attend to their business during the day and return at nightfall to sleep with their children in the house of a relation. The furniture, clothes, and everything else in the house were reduced to ashes."

Under powers granted by the Protection of Persons and Property Act 1881, Patrick Walsh's trial was moved to Dublin from Galway upon the strong recommendation of Henry Brackenbury, assistant undersecretary for police and crime. Brackenbury had read a report written by S. I. Horne, the man in charge of the Walsh murder case, which stated that:

"So demoralized by fear owning to the recent outrages and the general state of intimidation which prevails, that not only no jury dare find Pat Walsh guilty, but that no one man on such a jury dare propose to find him guilty, and that there is a certainty of acquittal."

Patrick Walsh was convicted of murder and hanged in Galway Gaol on 22 September 1882.

== Aftermath ==
A leading witness for the prosecution of the murders, Constable Kavanagh, was shot dead outside Letterfrack barracks on 15 February 1882. Walsh's brother, Michael, was tried, found guilty and sentenced to death but had it commuted to penal servitude for life on account of him being sixteen.

The turbulent times in the area in which these events took place gave rise to many injustices including the execution and imprisonment of innocent people. There are notable similarities between the hanging of Patrick Walsh and the subsequent prosecution and execution of Maolra Seoighe for the so called Maamtrasna murders (now widely acknowledged as the hanging of an innocent man). Coincidentally an article on the Maamtrasna murders appears just above the report of the execution of Patrick Walsh in The Galway Express of 23 September 1882. Both men were fluent Irish speakers but were convicted in English speaking courts after having their cases moved to Green Street Dublin.

Walsh and Seoighe were hanged by the same executioner William Marwood in Galway Gaol. Both had appealed to Lord Spencer on their innocence and had been answered that "The Law must take its course". Both men made strikingly similar declarations of innocence on the gallows. Patrick Walsh proclaimed "I am going before my God and tied up like a criminal who has deserved death. I never committed the murders; the witnesses swore falsely against me". This and other parallels between the cases can be found by reviewing the Irish Times article of 20 May 2016 entitled "A wrongful hanging in Connemara, 1882". When initially questioned by magistrate Gillman Browne, in the presence of Head Constable Brooke and Constable Butler, Martin Lydon stated "I cannot identify any of the party that fired the shots" It was only when subsequently visited by the magistrate J.C. Hall that Patrick Walsh’s name became implicated.

Further doubt over the conviction of Patrick Walsh was cast by the following report in The Freeman’s Journal of Tuesday 11 December 1883:

"The Letterfrack Murders, Edward Vallely and seven other men were indicted for complicity in the murder of the Lydens at Letterfrack in the county of Galway. They were also indicted for conspiracy to murder. Edward Vallely and six of the other prisoners pleaded guilty to the minor charge of conspiracy. Mr George Orme Malley, who with Mr Bird appeared for the prisoners, said that they had pleaded guilty to the minor offence of which they were charged with the full concurrence and by the advice of his learned brother and himself. He then addressed his lordship in favour of the mitigation of punishment. The Attorney-General, who with Sergeant Robinson QC, and Mr French appeared for the Crown, said that under the special circumstances of the case the Crown had determined on the merciful course of entering a nolle prosequi on the more serious charge of murder. He trusted this lesson would teach the people, if anything could teach them, the danger as well as the criminality involved in the entrance into those secret societies. His Lordship (a Mr Justice O’Brien) said he would give the utmost consideration to the observations of Mr Malley. He would read the informations again before delivering sentence." Martin Flaherty, who was the only one of the eight prisoners who refused to plead guilty to any offence, was also put back."

The extraordinary decision by the Crown not to prosecute the men for the murders, may be explained by the understandable reluctance of the Authorities to draw attention to a case in which they had a year before already executed (Patrick Walsh) an innocent man for that very same offence.

== Special Commission testimony ==
The Special Commission Act 1888 also referred to as the Parnell Commission produced extensive testimony on events from this period of Irish history. This included the testimony of Michael Davitt under questioning by Charles Russell, Baron Russell of Killowen on 4 July 1889. The cases of both Patrick and his brother Michael are referred to during his examination in the context of their convictions and subsequent punishments being due to the unwillingness of the family to turn informers and give up the true perpetrators of the crimes. Davitt confirms that he had been contacted by Honor Walsh, the boys’ mother and that he considered it is a noble act by their mother and her sons not to turn informer despite the consequences to themselves. This is confirmed in his response to Sir Charles Russell's statement "I understand you represent to my Lords that you think it a noble act to sacrifice the life of an innocent person in order that you yourself or that person may not be termed an informer?" to which Davitt responds "That is my view of this woman’s action".

At another point Sir Charles says "You now state that it was, in your opinion, a noble act for the mother and the son to decline to give the name, even though it would save the innocent boy's life?" to which Davitt responds "That is on account of the horror which the Irish peasantry have of the name of an informer".

Below are extracts of a letter written by Davitt on 15 October 1882 published in Irish World newspaper on 11 November 1882 these were referred to during his questioning by the Attorney General.

"Michael Walsh is still unreprieved, notwithstanding the recommendation of the packed jury which found him guilty. [Cable despatches report that the sentence has been commuted to penal servitude for life.—Ed. News.] From the accompanying certificate of birth it will be seen that the boy is only 15 years old. As did his brother from the moment of his sentence until he mounted the scaffold in Galway Gaol a few weeks ago, so does Michael Walsh proclaim his innocence of the crime imputed to him. I have it from the most trustworthy authority that the men who killed constable Kavanagh at Letterfrack have long since left the country, and that this poor boy, like his brother, is to [be] sacrificed to circumstantial evidence and the thirst for vengeance which now possesses the landlord-ruled Castle Executive."

"The mother of the poor boy Walsh, hearing that efforts were being made to induce her son to become an informer, went to the prison last week and exhorted him to meet his fate like his brother, rather than bring dishonour upon his name by becoming a hated informer. This poor woman also refuses to see Earl Spencer, whom she looks upon as the executioner of her other boy, to beg for mercy."

"The greatest revulsion of feeling is manifest in the whole district, and, indeed it may be said in the whole country, at the contemplation of a second execution in succession so rapid in the quiet old city of Galway, particularly as the circumstances of the same unfortunate family furnish the victims, the belief in the innocence of the first, who died with a protestation on his lips, and the extreme youth of the boy now awaiting the hangman, are so exceptionally heart-rending."

== See also ==
- Martin O'Halloran
- John Henry Blake
- Thomas Henry Burke (civil servant)
- Hubert de Burgh-Canning, 2nd Marquess of Clanricarde
- Myles Joyce
- William Marwood
- John Spencer, 5th Earl Spencer
