= Lynch's Castle =

- Caisleán an Linsigh
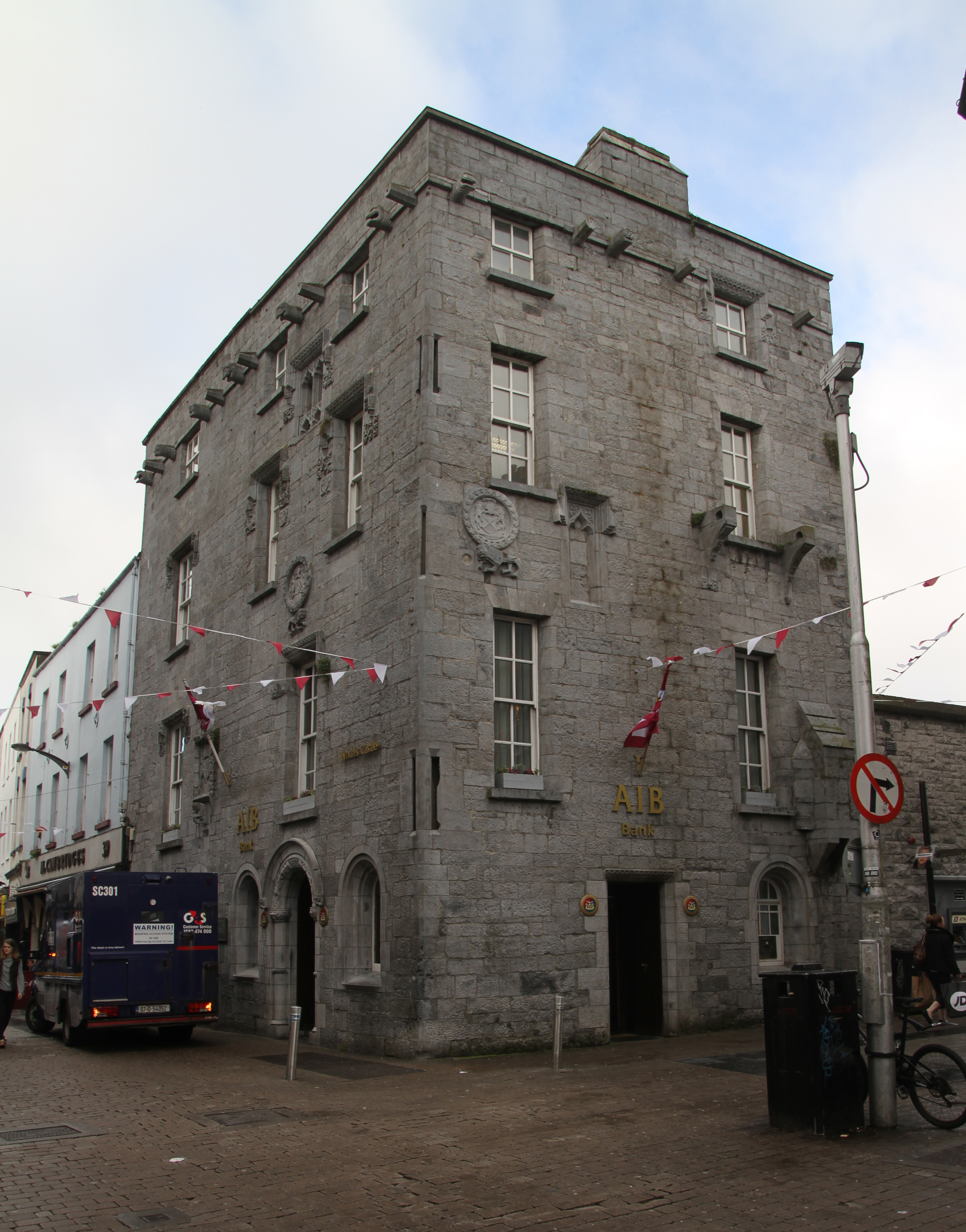
- Lynch's Castle

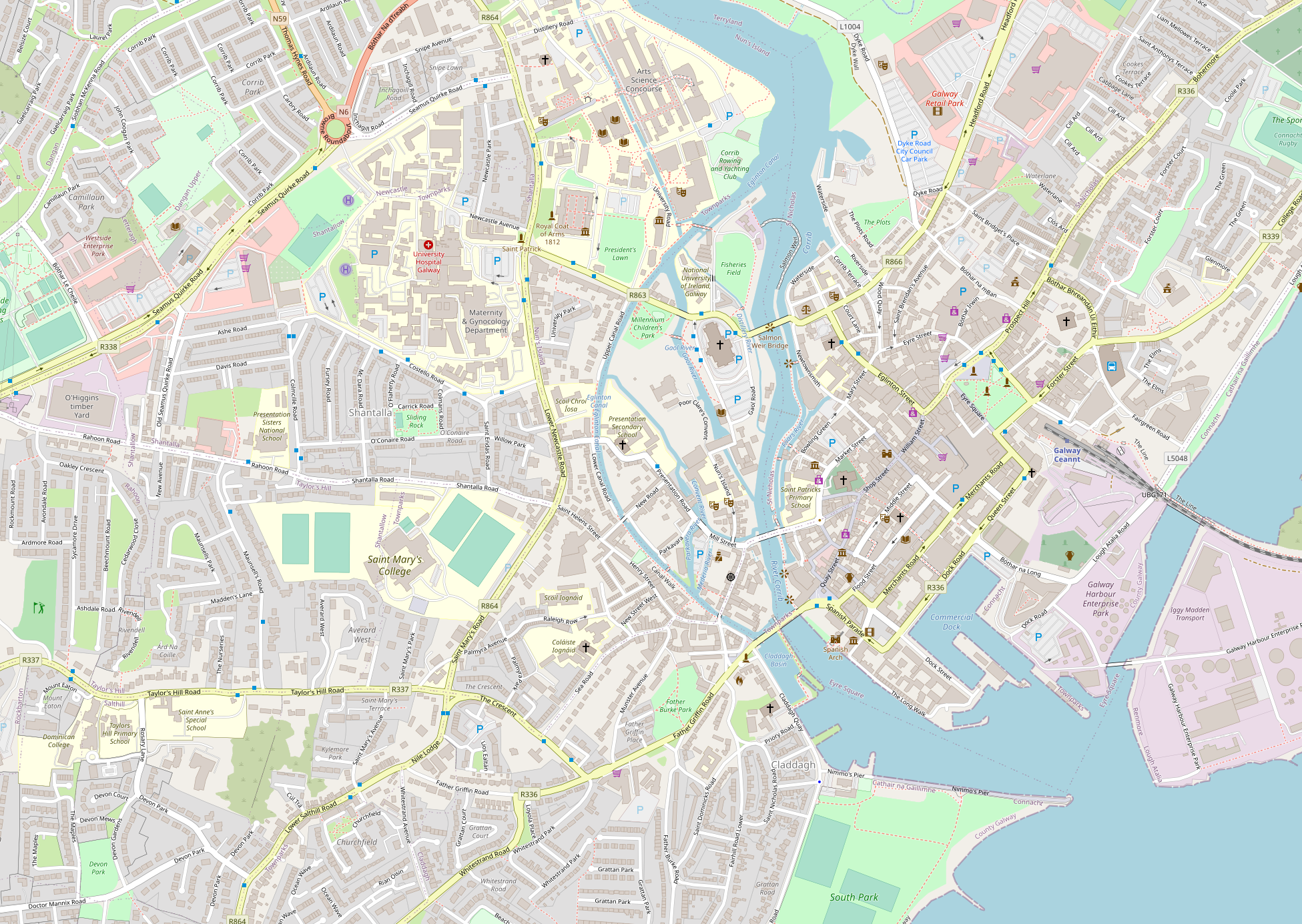
- Location within Galway

General information
- Architectural style: Gothic; Georgian
- Location: Shop Street, Galway, Ireland
- Coordinates: 53.2731°N 9.0522°W
- Owner: Allied Irish Banks

Lynch's Castle (Irish: Caisleán an Linsigh) is a fortified townhouse in Galway City, Ireland. It was built by the Lynch family, which was one of the Tribes of Galway. Today, it operates as an AIB Bank and is located on Shop Street.

The castle is one of the two surviving fortified town houses in Galway city owned by the Tribes of Galway, the other being Blake's Castle.

== History ==
The castle is assumed to have been built during the 15th or early 16th centuries.

The Coat of Arms of King Henry VII is present on the facade of the building.

The building was originally five stories tall, however the floor levels were changed in 1820 and Georgian windows were added.

In 1918, Nellie Burke (née Kirwan), rented the castle to the Munster & Leinster Bank. In 1920 she sold the castle, including some surrounding land called the French Property to the bank.

Between 1966 and 1964, bank manager Frank Dorgan had the masonry cleaned and repointed. He also added an extension to the castle on Abbeygate Street.

In 1966, the Munster & Leinster Bank was bought by Allied Irish Banks, and the premises continues to operate under the AIB name to this day.

== Gallery ==
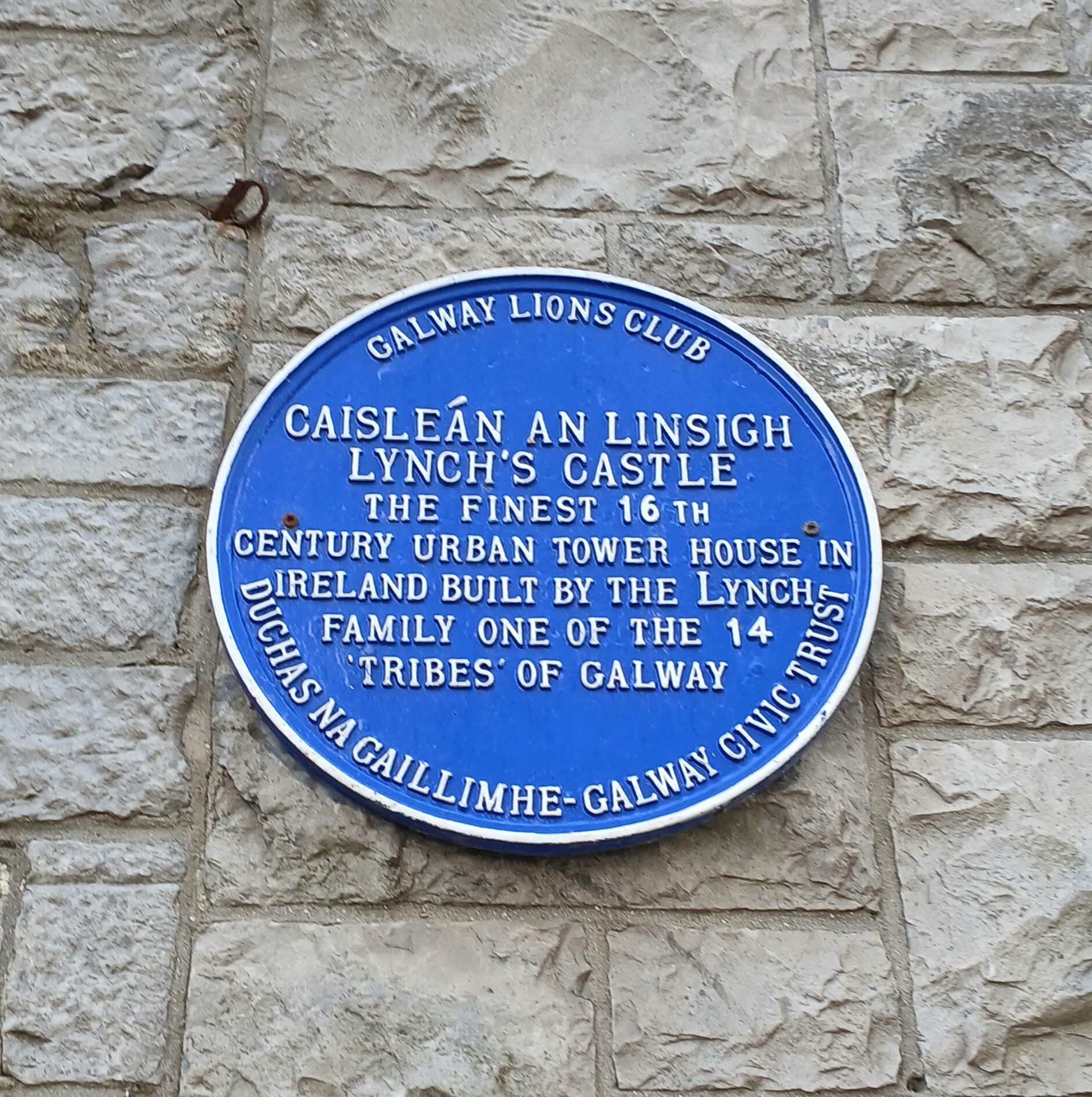
Galway Civic Trust plaque

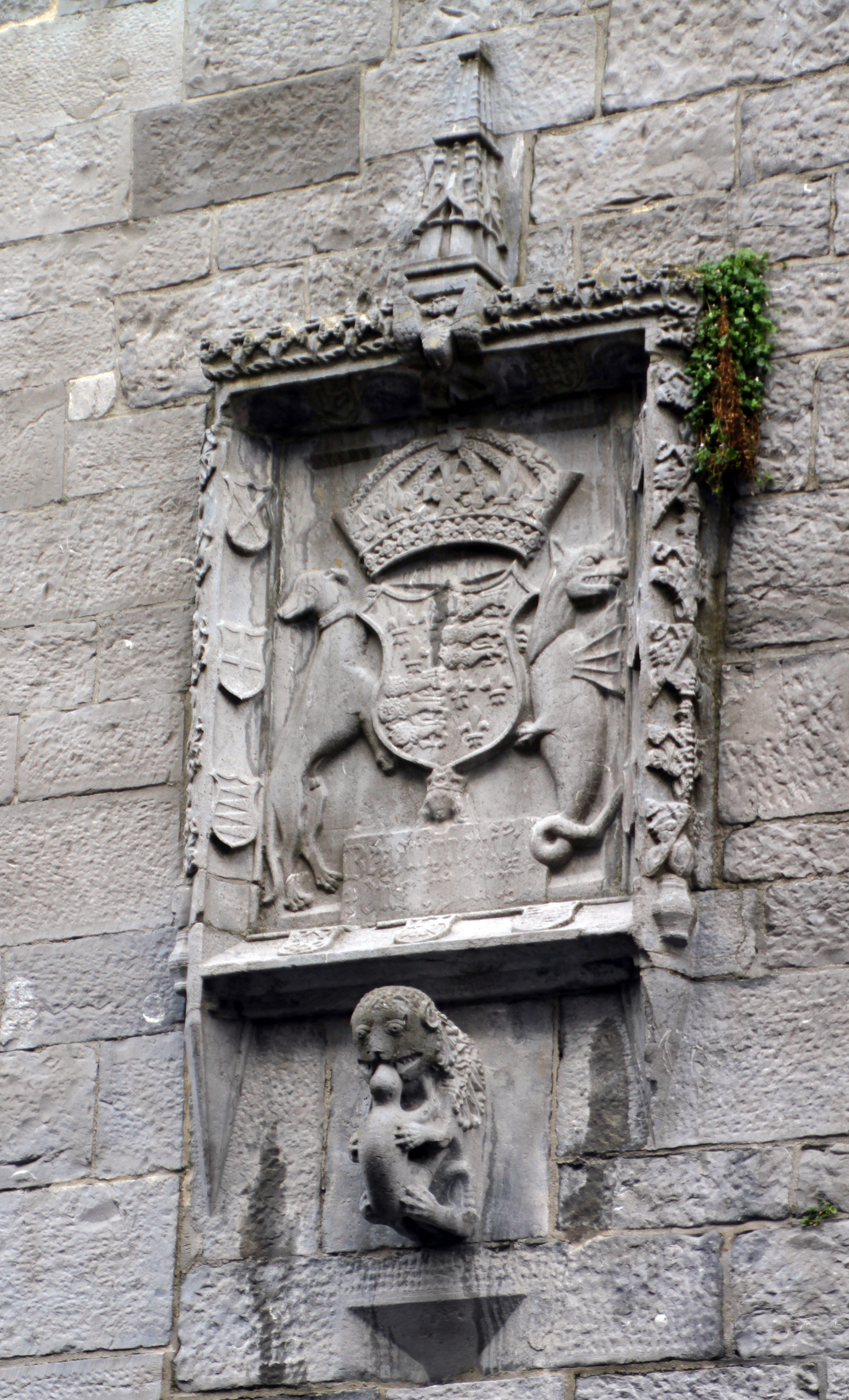
Henry VII Coat of Arms

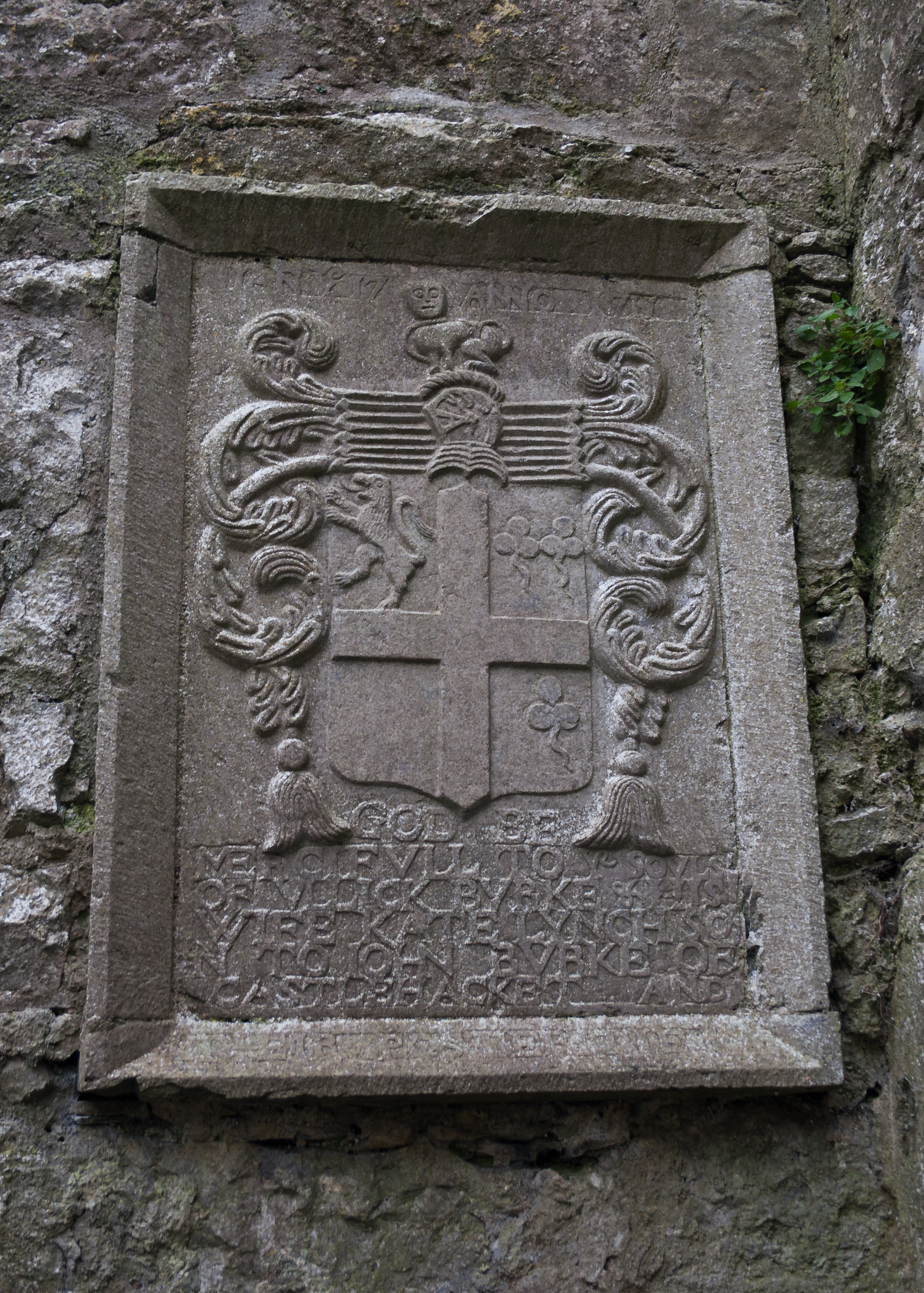
Plaque dedicated to Ullick Burke and Kate Lynch

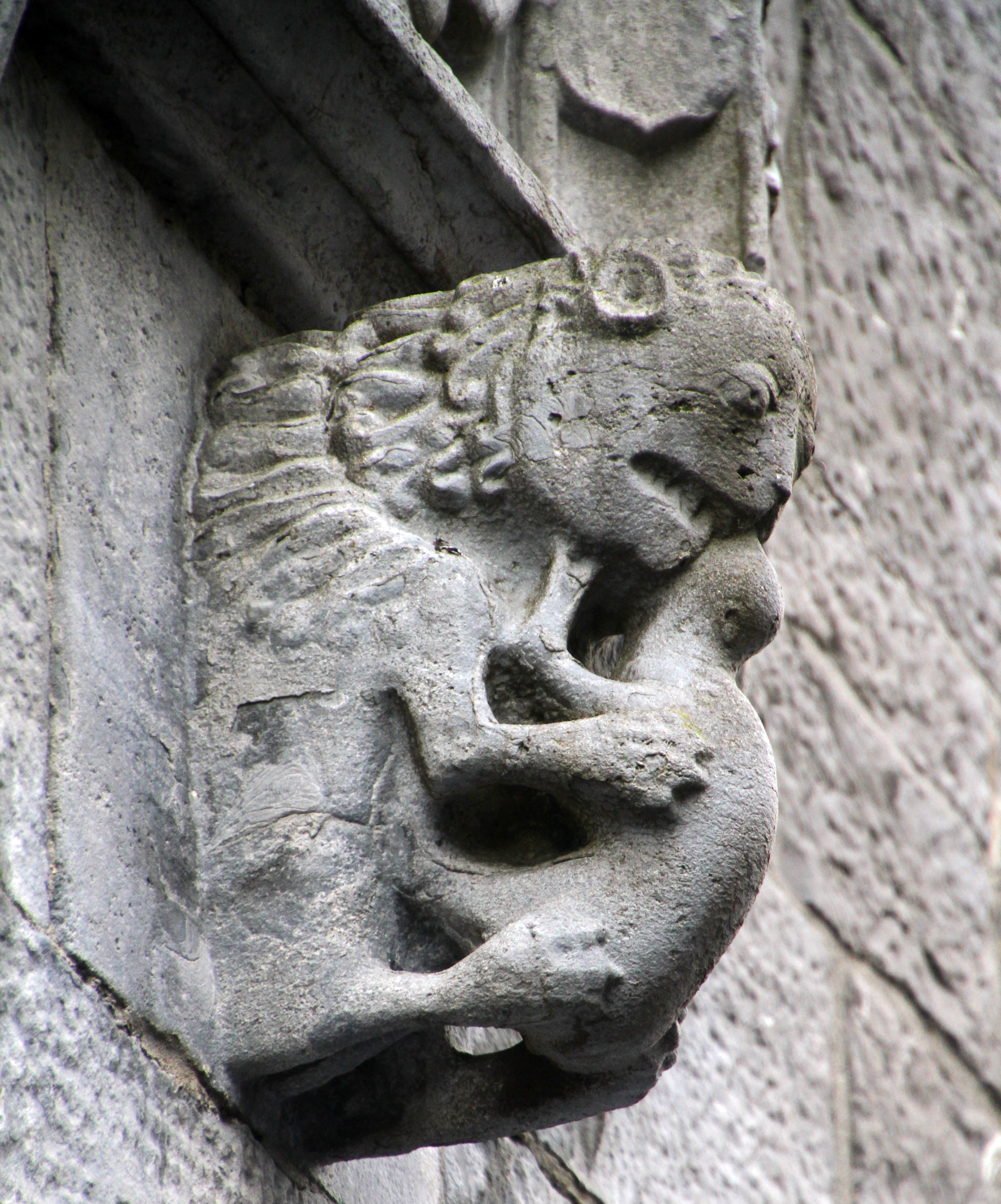

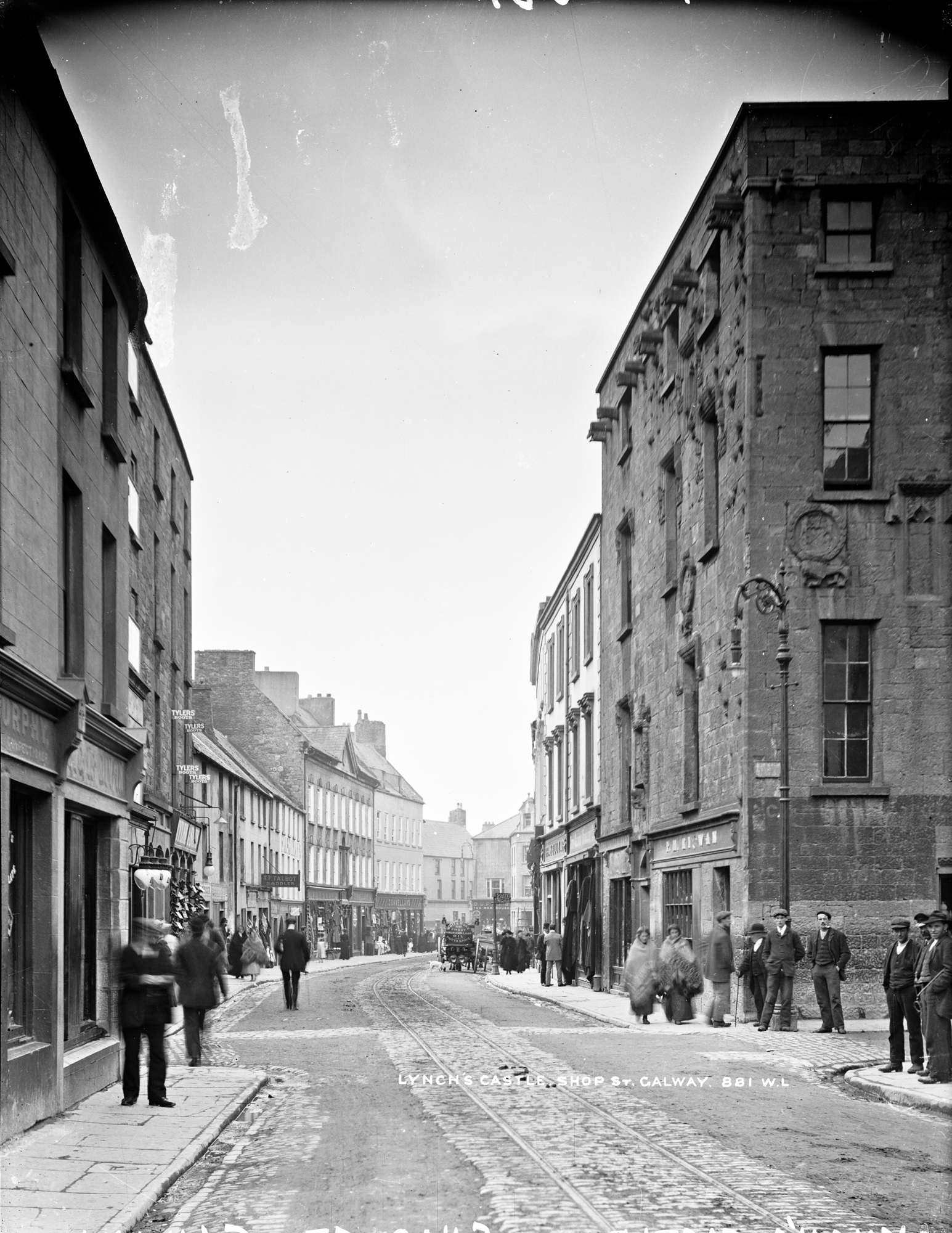
Lynch's Castle, photographed by Robert French. Note the Galway and Salthill Tramway tracks.

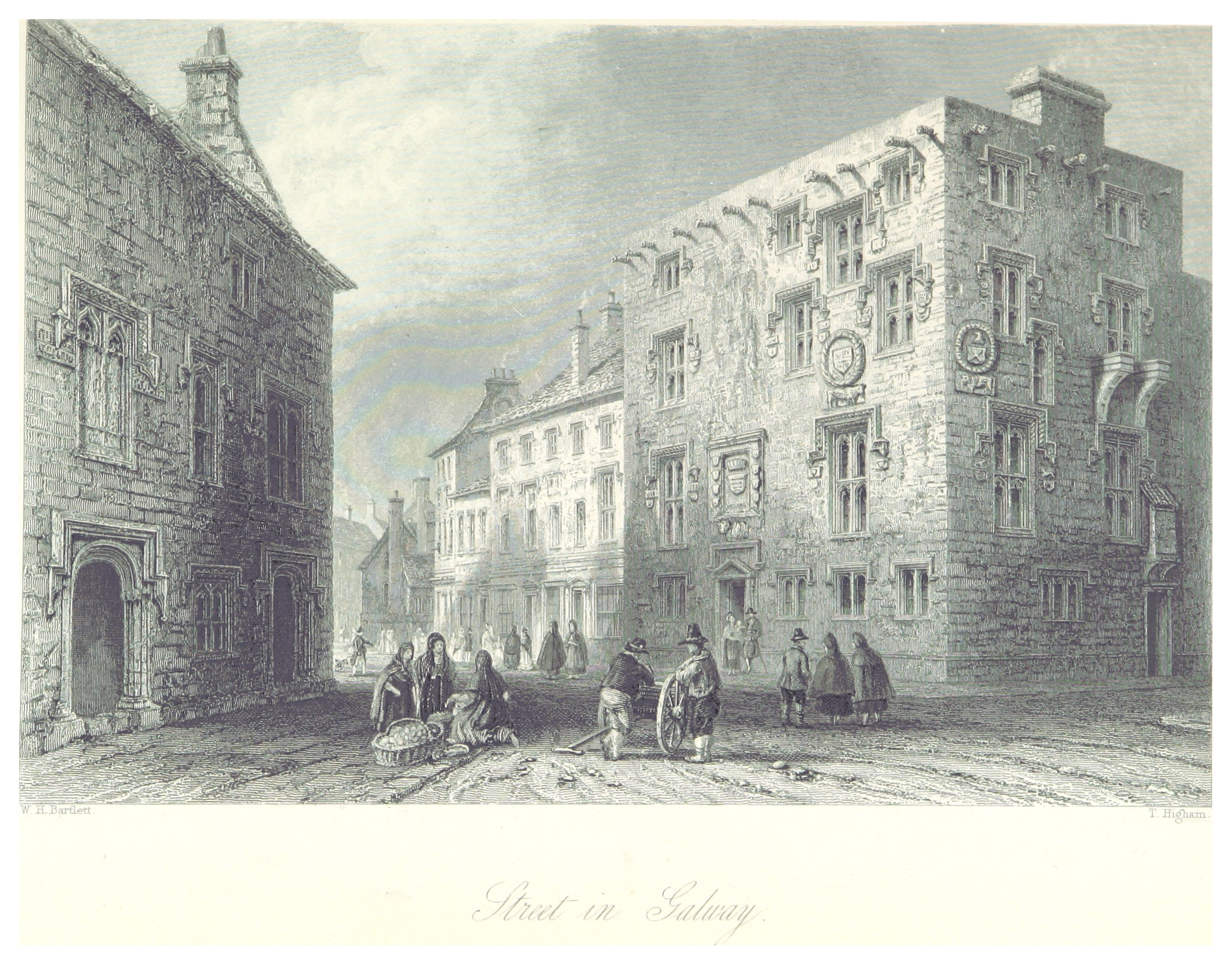

== See also ==
- List of banks in the Republic of Ireland
- Eyre Square
