= Cúirt International Festival of Literature =

Literary festival in Galway, Ireland

The Cúirt International Festival of Literature is an annual literary festival held since 1985 in Galway in Ireland. The Irish language word cúirt (pronounced koortch) means "court".

The festival consists of a variety of events taking place over the course of a week each April with attendances and contributions from Irish and international writers. It includes readings of poetry and fiction, discussions, poetry slams, book launches, masterclasses, spoken and musical performances, multimedia events, theatre, and visual art. It was originally a poetry festival but its scope has broadened to include other forms.

The festival is sponsored by Údarás na Gaeltachta; the National University of Ireland, Galway; the Arts Council; Galway City Council; Galway-Mayo Institute of Technology; Fáilte Ireland; Foras na Gaeilge.

Charlie Byrne's Bookshop hosts the festival's pop-up bookshop in the Town Hall Theatre each year.

== History ==
The Cúirt Filíochta Idirnáisiúnta na Gaillimhe (Galway's International Poetry Festival) of 1986 was held on 12–15 March. It featured John Cooper Clarke, Ian Crichton Smith, Paul Durcan, Douglas Dunn, Gerald Dawe, Nuala Ní Dhomhnaill, Sorley MacLean, Eavan Boland, founder Fred Johnston, Eva Bourke, Thomas McCarthy, Kathleen O'Driscoll, Rita Ann Higgins, Patrick Deeley, Pat Ingoldsby, and John Hogan.

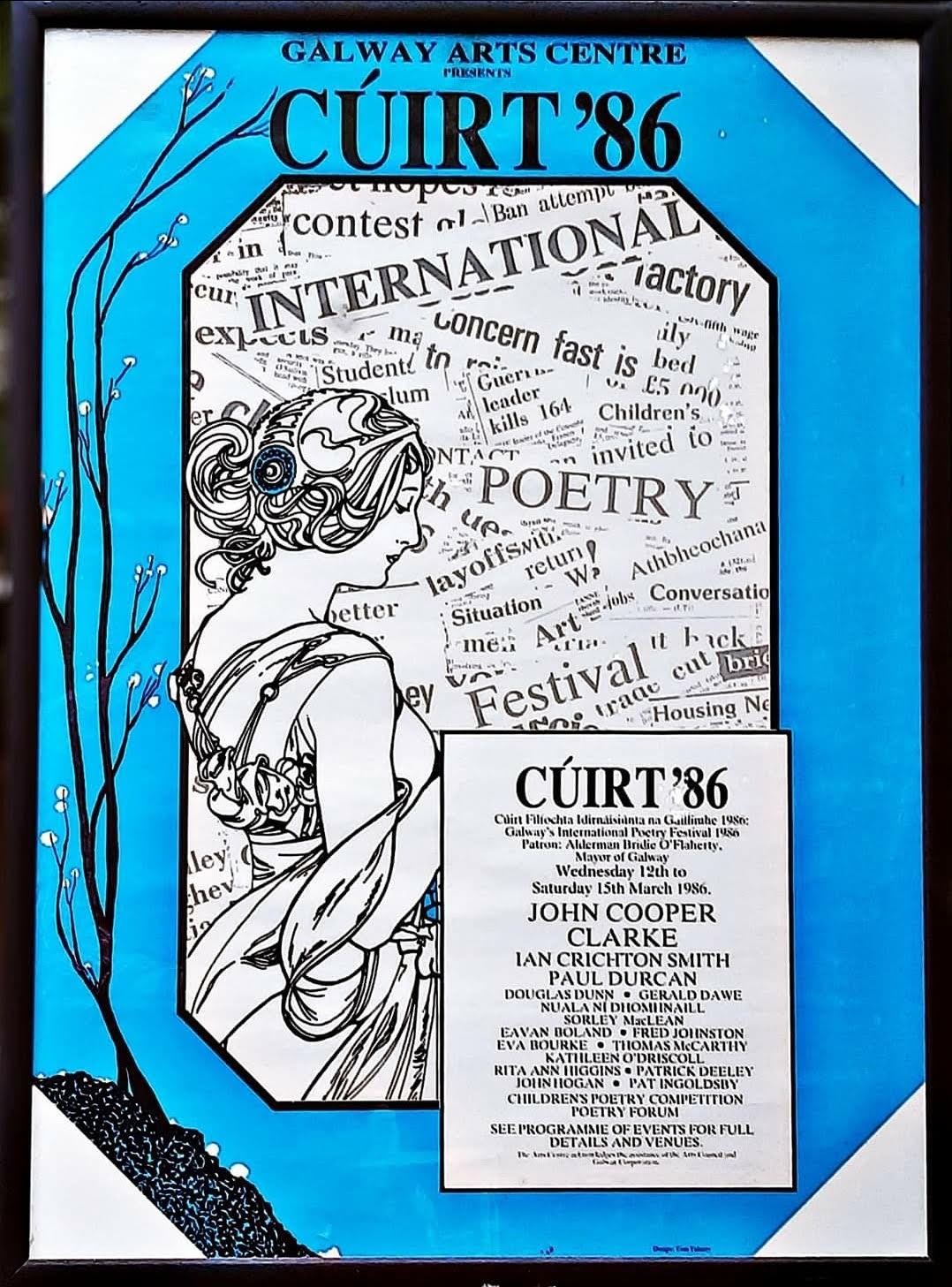
Cuirt '86 Poster by Tom Taheny

By the 2010s, the festival was starting to feature what would have once been fringe events as a large proportion of its main programme.

However, the 2010 festival (25th anniversary edition) had John Burnside, Charles Simic, Joyce Carol Oates and Gerard Smyth among others. Yet Eyjafjallajökull's eruption proved a disruptor as many participants were stranded on the far side of the Atlantic Ocean.

The 2011 festival was held on 12–17 April.

The 2012 festival was held on 23–29 April. Rosita Boland of The Irish Times described as "a baffling piece of programming" a history discussion in Middle Street's Mechanics Institute during which historians Niall Whelehan, Sonja Tiernan and John Borgonovo presented academic papers to the audience; "the event had no connection with literature or even with the arts in its most general form. The event was more the kind of presentation you'd expect to hear at an academic conference or a history society meeting", though gave approval to the presence at other events of internationally recognisable writers such as John Banville, Lydia Davis, Ruth Padel and Manuel Rivas. Boland, in a separate article for the newspaper, lamented that many "will undoubtedly be applying their craniums with vigour to the nearest wall at the prospect" of a "pop-up collaborative poetry studio" in a pub, "but the Poetry Depot is on the official programme, and it's happening twice".

The 2013 festival was held on 23–28 April. It featured Seamus Heaney and Michael Longley at the same event (in what turned out to be one of Heaney's last appearances a few months before his death), as well as Edna O'Brien.

The 2014 festival was held on 8–13 April.

The 2017 festival commemorated the Hibernophile French writer Michel Déon, who had died at the age of 97 shortly beforehand.

In 2018, Sally Rooney, Daniel Woodrell, Bernard MacLaverty, Juan Pablo Villalobos, Declan Kiberd and Forward Prize winners Sinead Morrissey and Daljit Nagra were announced as taking part.

On 30 March 2020, the organisers said that Cúirt—scheduled for between 20 and 25 April—would not proceed "in its physical form" in 2020 due to the restrictions in place in the country during the COVID-19 pandemic; however, only a small selection of the advertised events (including the Eilís Dillon centenary commemoration) were officially "postponed" and full ticket refunds were offered. On 6 April 2020, the organisers of Cúirt announced that it would hold a completely digital literary festival between 23 and 25 April, with events to be held at traditional venues such as the Town Hall Theatre, Nun's Island and Charlie Byrne's Bookshop, and broadcast through YouTube.

== Cúirt New Writing Prize ==
The Cúirt New Writing Prize is awarded at the festival and the winners receive cash prizes of €500. The winners in 2012 were Kevin O'Shea for poetry and Eamon Kelly for fiction. The winners in 2013 were Caoilinn Hughes for three poems from her collection, Gathering Evidence ("Rational Dress", "Two Roundelets", and "Airbowing in Second Violins"), and Hugo Kelly for his short story, "There It Is". In 2014, the winners were Colm Scully, for poetry, and Philip Connor, for fiction, and each won €500. The Young Cúirt winner was Saffron Lily, who won €100.
