= Naas Courthouse =

Neoclassical courthouse in County Kildare, Ireland

- Teach Cúirte An Nás
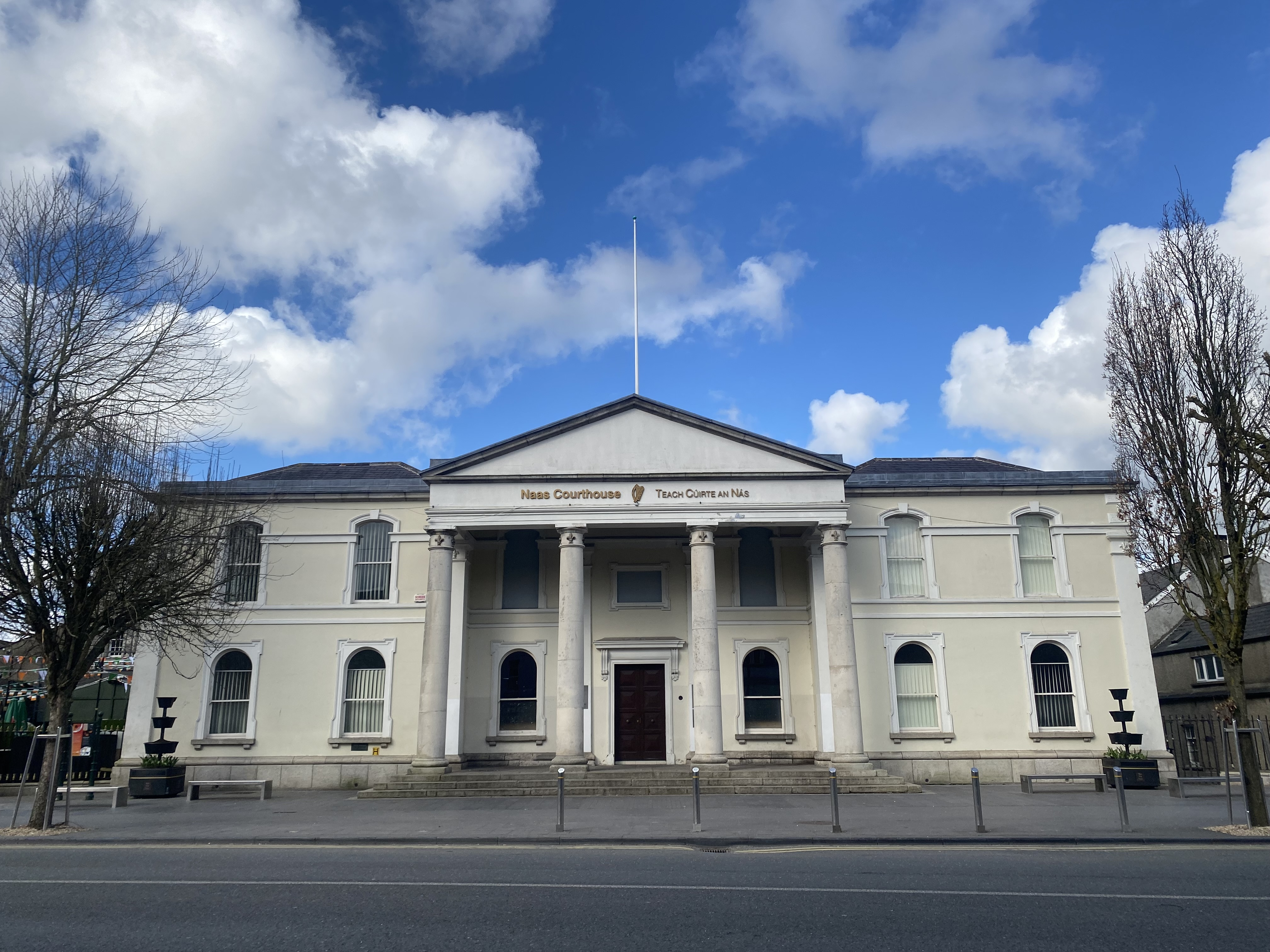
- Naas Courthouse

- Location within Ireland

General information
- Type: Courthouse
- Architectural style: Neoclassical
- Location: Naas, County Kildare, Ireland
- Coordinates: 53°13′00″N 6°39′53″W
- Completed: 1807

Design and construction
- Architect: Sir Richard Morrison

Other information
- Parking: On-site
- Public transit: Naas Post Office bus stop (Bus Éireann routes 125, 126, 130, 139, 717, 726, 736, 817, 826, 846)

Naas Courthouse is a judicial facility in Main Street, Naas, County Kildare, Ireland.

== History ==
The courthouse, which was designed by Sir Richard Morrison in the neoclassical style and built in ashlar stone, was completed in 1807. The design involved a symmetrical main frontage with seven bays facing Main Street; the central section featured a tetrastyle portico with Doric order columns supporting an entablature and a pediment.

The building was primarily used as a facility for dispensing justice but, following the implementation of the Local Government (Ireland) Act 1898, which established county councils in every county, the Grand Jury Room also became the meeting place for Kildare County Council. After a major fire in the courthouse, the county council moved to the former St Mary's Fever Hospital in the late 1950s. The courthouse was reconstructed after the fire; it was refurbished again in the 1990s and the building continues to be used as a judicial facility.
