= Salmon Weir Bridge =

Bridge in Galway, Ireland

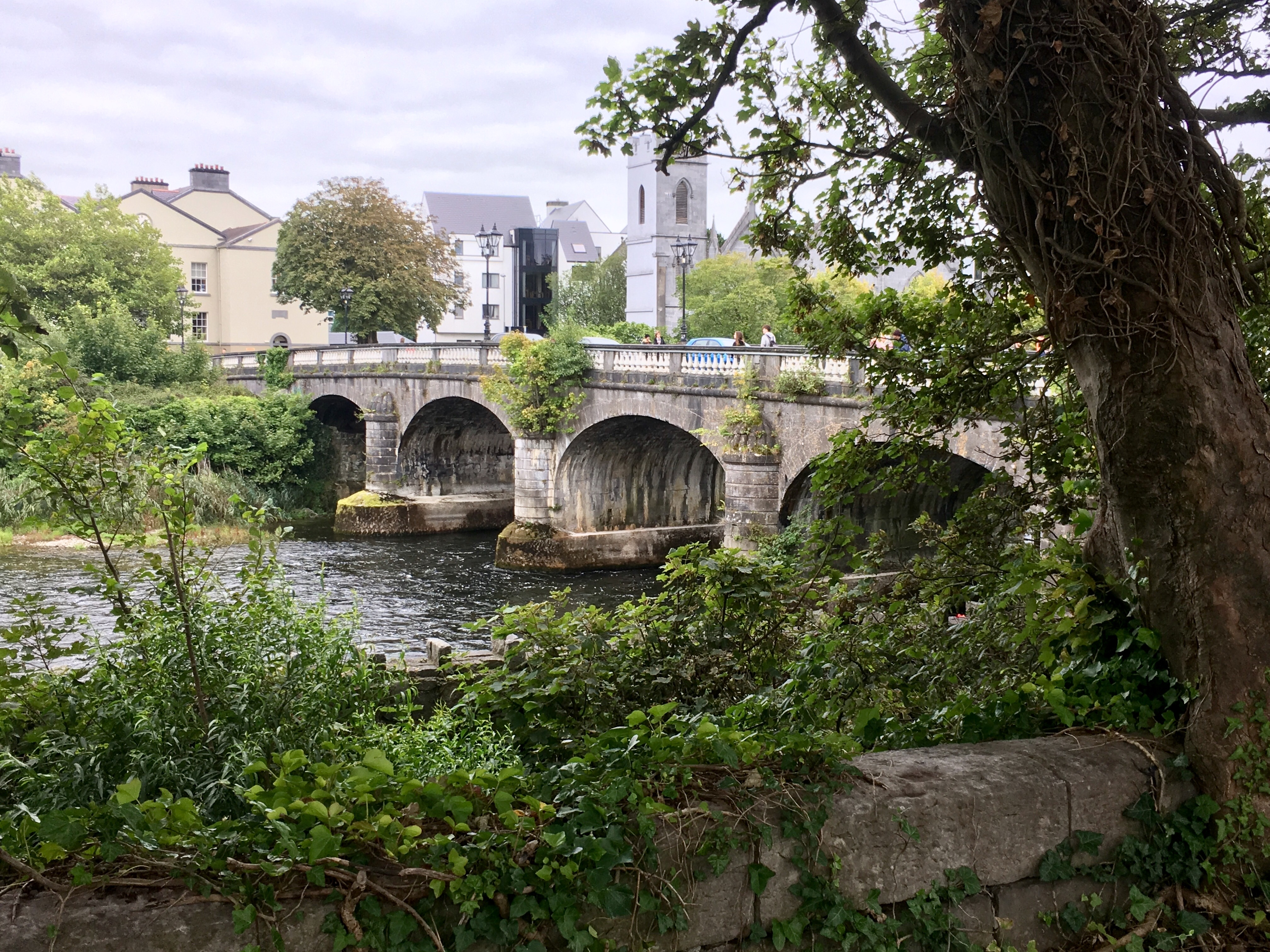
- Coordinates: 53.27554°N 9.05615°W
- Crosses: River Corrib
- Locale: Galway, Ireland
- Other name: Gaol Bridge

Characteristics
- No. of spans: 5

History
- Designer: William Vitruvius Morrison
- Construction start: 29 June 1818
- Construction end: 1819
- Opened: October 1819; 206 years ago

Location
- Interactive map of Salmon Weir Bridge

The Salmon Weir Bridge is a bridge that spans the River Corrib in Galway City, Ireland. It is included in the Record of Protected Structures maintained by Galway City Council.

== History ==
The Salmon Weir Bridge was designed by William Vitruvius Morrison to connect the newly built Galway Courthouse to the newly built Galway Gaol on Nun's Island, and was built at the same time as the nearby salmon weir. The bridge was originally known as the Gaol Bridge.

Construction of the bridge began on 29 June 1818, when the foundation stone of the bridge was laid by William Le Poer Trench. The bridge opened in October 1819.

In 1977, it was reported that 1,200 vehicles used the bridge every hour.
