= Joe Togher =

Irish republican

Joe Togher (8 September 1898 – 1974) was an Irish Republican.

== Early life ==
Togher's father was a shopkeeper in Headford, his mother was from Carlow, and they had three more sons and a daughter. His father died when he was very young, so in 1910 his mother moved the family into Francis Street in Galway where she opened a small hotel (see photograph) to support them. She was very busy with the business so it was Joe's sister Nell who looked after him. He went to 'The Mon' where a nationalistic Brother Leo was a major influence. Joe was a good oarsman, a champion sculler.

He joined the Post Office in 1915 as a learner and later transferred to the telegraphic section. In 1916 the RIC mounted a guard on the GPO, though this did not take place until the Wednesday after the Rising. The executions that followed sickened many Galwegians. The Redmond Volunteers had been acting in Galway since 1913, but many regarded them with suspicion and felt they were acting as special constables for the British. They began to decline when the Irish Volunteers were formed. Togher joined the Castlegar company of the IVs as they were more active than the city company.

== Active service ==
In 1919 he went to University College, Galway to study medicine, but soon gave this up to work in the sorting office of the GPO. Mick Newell, the captain of the Volunteers, suggested to him that he should remain inconspicuous as he could be potentially very useful because of his job. Peter Hynes instructed him on ciphers, on making them up and breaking them down. Togher worked undercover as far as possible. "I dealt personally with all the incoming and outgoing mails for both the military and RIC at Renmore and Eglinton Barracks. It meant quite a lot of night work for me in order to ensure no delay. To enter the office at night, which I could not do officially, I was obliged to climb in through a second floor window, extract any mail I was doubtful about, bring them back home, break up the cipher, and pass the information to the Brigade Commandant, Seamus Murphy." His biggest problem was getting those mails back unnoticed. He also supplied information to units of the IRA in south Mayo and to Michael Collins in GHQ in Dublin, the latter usually via men who worked on the mail van on the Galway/Dublin train. As almost every second person on the street in the area where he worked was either a policeman or a soldier, it was remarkable that he was able to achieve all this.

One day a cipher gave a large amount of trouble, so rather than copying it, he took it away, but this resulted in all the telegrams being locked away at night in the assistant superintendent's safe. They managed to make an impression of the key to the safe while the assistant super was busy, and a blacksmith in the Volunteers named Flanagan made a perfect copy which worked beautifully.

In October 1920 the British set up a central intelligence depot in a house in Dominick Street. A Captain Keating was in complete charge and had over-riding authority on all branches of the British forces, army, RIC, navy, auxiliaries, and Black & Tans – in all, some 2,000 men. Joe Togher had a pal, Michael Brennan, who befriended Keating and as a result managed to supply Togher "with many items of useful information such as Keating fitting, instructing, and sending out agents throughout the county disguised as tramps or otherwise, some of whom never returned and others who brought back useless information".

== PW Joyce ==
About this time the Volunteers decided someone was passing information on them to the Crown Forces – how else could they explain the precision attacks and raids being made on homes and people in the Barna/Moycullen hinterland? The Volunteers had their own secret service trying to infiltrate the secret lines of the British. This group was pioneered by John Hosty, a printer in O'Gorman's, and he asked Togher for help. Shortly after, he picked out five letters addressed in the same handwriting to The County Officer, Black & Tans, Eglinton St Barracks (two letters); to the OC, Renmore Barracks; to the County Officer, Military Station, Earl's Island; and to Sir Hamar Greenwood, House of Commons. All the letters were signed Patrick W. Joyce, and it was obvious from them that he was supplying information to the British. Togher passed these on to John Hosty, and in turn they were sent to the Provisional Government in Dublin who sent back an order that Joyce was to be court martialled. As a result, he was executed and buried in a bog between Barna and Moycullen.

The Tans knew Joyce was missing and believed him dead. They also believed a priest had given him his last confession and wrongly assumed this to be Father Michael Griffin, so they abducted him, tortured him, shot him, and buried him in a bog in Barna. When his remains were discovered a week later it became an international incident and generated worldwide publicity. As a result, a number of locals, including Togher, were arrested and imprisoned in Galway Gaol. He was interrogated by a Captain Harrison "who seemed to have a mass of information, most of it correct, as to men and formations and happenings". Togher was told he was second in line to be shot after a prominent Sinn Féiner, Frank Hardiman. With some others he was released but he "decided we were released to be shot, and I went on the run".

== On the run ==
He helped form a new company but they had problems, lacking as they were in arms and military training, so they could not do much apart from burning enemy stores and taking occasional shots at different barracks and at the 17th Lancers on Earl's Island from a point across the river known as the Dyke. With others he managed to do valuable intelligence work using information passed on by Miss Carter in the County Club, George Cunniffe in the Railway Hotel, the staff in Baker's Hotel in Eyre Street, and in the Skeffington Arms and other hostelries frequented by the British. He also made good contacts, especially a Sergeant Cantwell RAM Corps, a signals NCO named McKeown, and an army civilian employee named Hickey who was attached to the intelligence section. As a result, he got notice of troop movements, reports on different raids, etc. He also helped spread false information on "impending attacks by the IRA, strangers seen in town, etc, all for the purpose of using enemy forces in town while the columns outside (Mayo and Clare) were getting on with the real war".

He was wounded during an ambush on Achill Island and at one stage, when the Tans were searching for him, he was ferried across the river from the Franciscans to the Iodine. Once, while still on the run, he came back to his mother's house exhausted. He went to bed and slept, but his mother heard some activity and went to warn Togher. He got out of the house somehow, but in his haste he left his gun behind. His mother found it and hid it under her skirt. The Tans questioned her: “Where is he, where is he?” and when they could not find him, caused a lot of damage in the house, wrecking things, tipping a tea chest of tea all over the floor, breaking all the eggs, etc.

Togher went to Dublin (probably early in 1921) to the IRA headquarters looking for arms. He got “all the advice and assistance they could give, but arms and ammunition were not available”. Among those he worked with at that time were Martin Brennan, Jack Darcy, Tom Lydon, Tim Duggan, Johnny Carter, William Carter, and on the civilian side, George Cunniffe, Joe Heneghan, Mick Brennan, Terry Mahon, Mr Temple of the railway staff, and Joe Kirwan of the National Bank.

After the truce he took up on the Treaty side and was almost killed twice by the Irregulars during the Civil War. He became a captain in the Army and when he retired from that he went back to work in the Post Office.

== Post war ==
In 1924 he married Jenny Lydon from College Road and they had three children, Des, Tony, and Bláth. His wife continued to run the hotel. He was a very well-read man with an extensive library. He enjoyed a pint with his friends in his local, Carty’s in Dominick Street, and was an avid fisherman, the only survivor of a tragic boating accident on the Corrib when Bill Forde of the Skeffington Arms and Shane McNally drowned. He died in 1974 and was buried in Ross Errilly Abbey with full military honours.
