= Maolra Seoighe =

Irish victim of miscarriage of justice

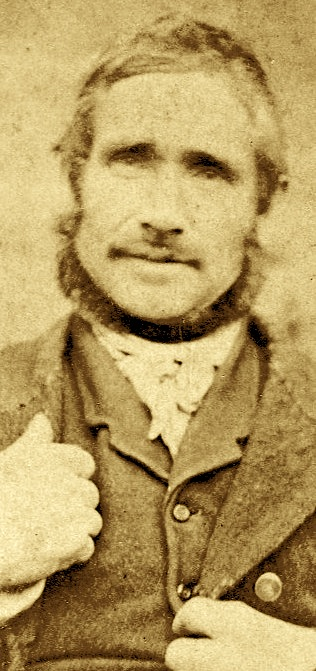
Maolra Seoighe, taken from prison, 1882.

Maolra Seoighe (English: Myles Joyce) was an Irish man who was wrongfully convicted and hanged on 15 December 1882. He was found guilty of the Maamtrasna Murders and was sentenced to death. Though Seoighe could only speak Irish, the case was heard in English without any translation service. He was posthumously pardoned in 2018.

== Maamtrasna murders ==
Maolra Seoighe was the most prominent figure in a controversial trial in 1882 that took place while Ireland was part of the United Kingdom. Three Irish language speakers were condemned to death for the murder of a local family (John Joyce, his wife Brighid, his mother Mairéad, his daughter Peigí and son Mícheál) in Maamtrasna, on the border between County Mayo and County Galway. It was presumed by the authorities to be a local feud connected to sheep rustling and the Land War. Eight men were convicted on what turned out to be perjured evidence and three of them condemned to death: Maolra Seoighe (a father of five children), Pat Casey and Pat Joyce.

Covering the incident, The Spectator wrote the following:

The Tragedy at Maamtrasna, investigated this week in Dublin, almost unique as it is in the annals of the United Kingdom, brings out in strong relief two facts which Englishmen are too apt to forget. One is the existence in particular districts of Ireland of a class of peasants who are scarcely civilised beings, and approach far nearer to savages than any other white men; and the other is their extraordinary and exceptional gloominess of temper. In remote places of Ireland, especially in Connaught, on a few of the islands, and in one or two mountain districts, dwell cultivators who are in knowledge, in habits, and in the discipline of life no higher than Maories or other Polynesians.

The court proceedings were carried out in a language the accused did not understand (English), with a solicitor from Trinity College Dublin, who did not speak Irish. The three were executed in Galway by William Marwood for the crime in 1882. The role of John Spencer, 5th Earl Spencer, who was then Lord Lieutenant of Ireland, is the most controversial aspect of the trial, leading most modern scholars to characterise it as a miscarriage of justice; research carried out in The National Archives by Seán Ó Cuirreáin, has found that Spencer "compensated" three alleged eyewitnesses to the sum of £1,250, equivalent to €157,000 (by 2016 rates).

Feicfidh mé Iosa Críost ar ball beag - crochadh eisean san éagóir chomh maith. ... Ara, tá mé ag imeacht ... Go bhfóire Dia ar mo bhean agus a cúigear dílleachtaí. I will be seeing Jesus Christ soon - he too was also unjustly hanged ... I am leaving ... the blessings of God on my wife and her five orphans.

— Maolra Seoighe's final words

Timothy Harrington, then MP for Westmeath, took up the case, claiming that the Crown Prosecutor for the case George Bolton, had deliberately withheld evidence from the trial. In 2011, two sitting members of the House of Lords, the Liberal Democrat life peers David Alton and Eric Lubbock, requested a review of the case. Crispin Blunt, Tory Parliamentary Under-Secretary of State for Prisons and Youth Justice, stated that Seoighe was "probably an innocent man", but that he would not be seeking an official pardon.

On 4 April 2018 Michael D. Higgins, the President of Ireland, issued a pardon on the advice of the government of Ireland saying "Maolra Seoighe was wrongly convicted of murder and was hanged for a crime that he did not commit." It is the first presidential pardon relating to an event predating the foundation of the state in 1922 and the second time a pardon has been issued after an execution. The case of Maolra Seoighe is not an isolated one, and there are strong similarities with the case of Patrick Walsh who was hanged in Galway Gaol on 22 September 1882 just three months before Seoighe for the murders of Martin and John Lydon. The same key players and political factors were active in both cases and his conviction is just as questionable as that of Seoighe.

== Media ==
In September 2009, the story featured on RTÉ's CSI programme under an episode entitled CSI Maamtrasna Massacre. A dramatised Irish-language film regarding the affair, entitled Murdair Mhám Trasna, produced by Ciarán Ó Cofaigh was released in 2017.

== See also ==
- List of miscarriage of justice cases
- Guildford Four
- Birmingham Six
- Land War
