= William Vitruvius Morrison =

Irish architect (1794 – 1838)

William Vitruvius Morrison (1794 – 16 October 1838) was an Irish architect, son and collaborator of Sir Richard Morrison.

== Life ==
He was born at Clonmel, County Tipperary, second son of Sir Richard Morrison (1767–1849) and Elizabeth Ould, a granddaughter of the celebrated physician and author Sir Fielding Ould. His middle name derives from the first century B.C. Roman architect Marcus Vitruvius Pollio. Sir Richard headed a successful private architectural practice and was an architect at Trinity College, Dublin. He joined his father's practice in 1809. In 1821 he made an extensive tour of Europe, including visits to Rome and Paris. Upon his return, he built up a successful practice, but later his health broke down. After a second visit to the continent he died in his father's house at Bray, County Wicklow, on 16 October 1838 and is buried in Mount Jerome Cemetery, Dublin.

== Works ==
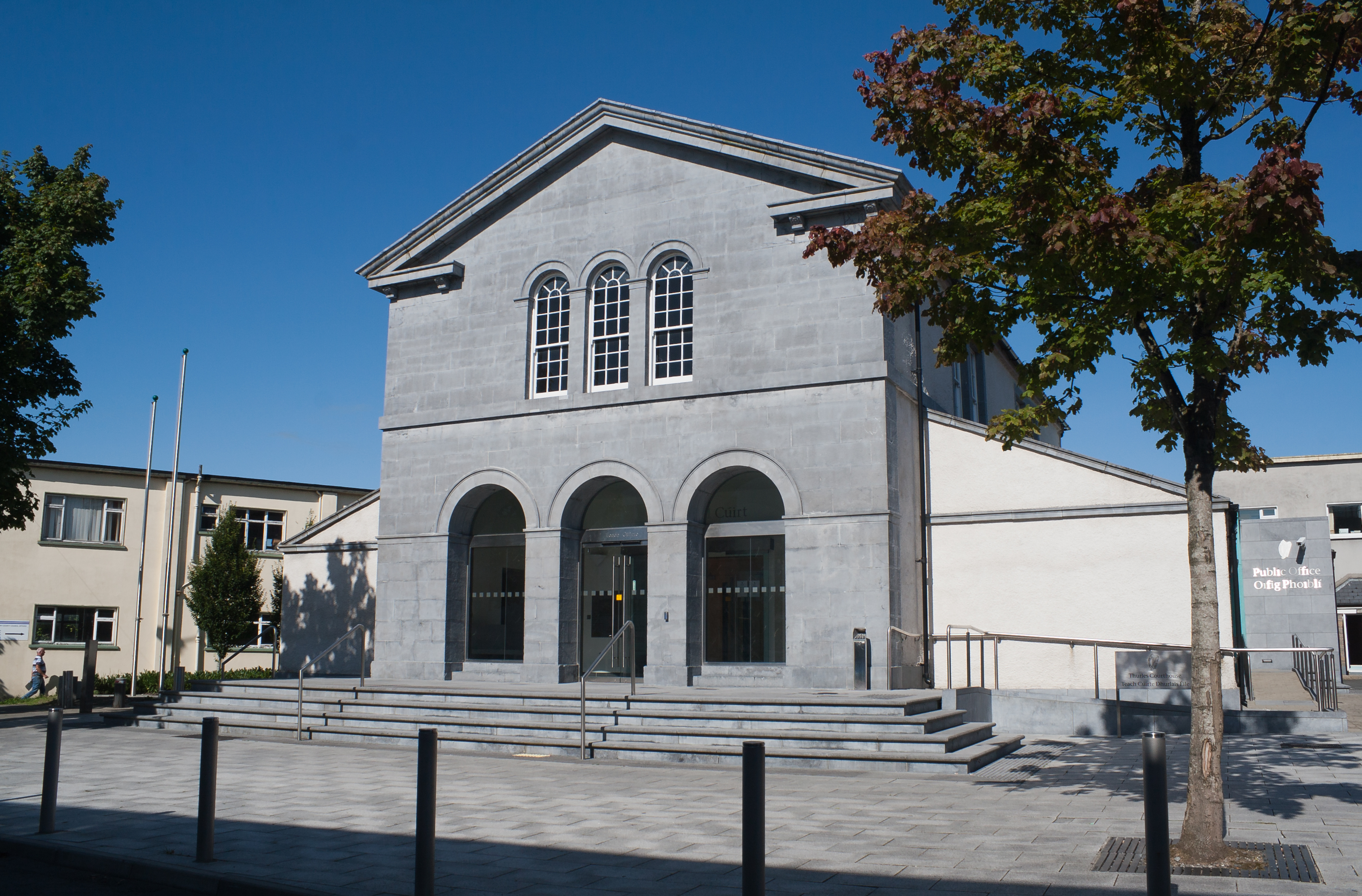
Thurles court house, designed by Morrison in 1826.

Morrison designed a number of works with his father, including Baronscourt, County Tyrone (from 1835), Kilruddery, County Wicklow, Ballyfin, County Laois and Fota, County Cork.

Notable houses that he designed himself include Clontarf Castle, Clontarf, County Dublin (1836–1827), Glenarm Castle and Barbican, Glenarm, County Antrim (1823–1824), Hollybrooke House, Bray, County Wicklow (1835) and Mount Stewart, Newtownards, County Down (1825–1828).

His public buildings include Salmon Weir Bridge, Galway (1819), Wicklow Gaol (1822), Carlow Courthouse (1834), Tralee Courthouse (1834) and the Ross Monument, Rostrevor, County Down (1826), commemorating Major-General Robert Ross (1766–1814).

== Bibliography ==
- Rowan, Ann Martha (1989). The Architecture of Richard Morrison and William Vitruvius Morrison. Dublin: Irish Architectural Archive. ISBN 0-9515536-0-7.
