= Richard Morrison (architect) =

Irish architect (1767 – 1844)

Sir Richard Morrison (1767 – 31 October 1849 / 1844) was an Irish architect.

== Life ==
He was born at Midleton, County Cork, the son of John Morrison, also an architect. Originally intended for the church, he was eventually placed as a pupil with James Gandon, the celebrated architect, in Dublin. He obtained through his godfather, Richard Boyle, 2nd Earl of Shannon, a post in the ordnance department at Dublin, but this he abandoned. when he entered into full-time practice as an architect. He married Elizabeth Ould, daughter of the Reverend William Ould, and granddaughter of the noted physician Sir Fielding Ould, and had at least four children.

Having resided for some time at Clonmel, where his second son, William Vitruvius was born, he moved about 1800 to Dublin and settled at Bray, County Wicklow.

He died at Bray on 31 October 1849, and was buried in Mount Jerome Cemetery, Dublin. Other sources claim that his death was in 1844.

He was a founder-member in 1839 and the first vice-president of the Royal Institute of the Architects of Ireland. In 1793 he published Useful and Ornamental Designs in Architecture.

== Works ==
Morrison designed a number of works with his son, William Vitruvius Morrison, including: Baronscourt, near Newtownstewart in County Tyrone (from 1835); Killruddery House, near Bray in County Wicklow; Ballyfin, just north of Mountrath in County Laois; and Fota, near Cork in County Cork. Richard Morrison also designed Knockdrin Castle, just north of Mullingar in County Westmeath, and Naas Courthouse in County Kildare.

A prominent work was his Gothic fantasy 1819 remodelling of Shelton Abbey, Arklow, County Wicklow.

== Courthouses ==
Roscommon Town, 1832. Clonmel, Co. Tipperary 1801. Wexford, 1803–6. Dundalk, Co. Louth 1804. Cork County 1806. Portlaoise 1805. Naas, Co. Kildare 1807. Trim, Co. Meath. 1809. Galway, Co. Galway 1812–15.

== Churches ==
Steeple, Rathronan Church, Co. Tipperary, 1797. Chapel at Bellevue, Delgany 1803. Chapel at Borris House, Co. Carlow. 1813.

== Houses ==
Castlegar Co. Galway 1801–7. Pollacton Co. Carlow 1802. Askabawn hunting lodge Co. Wicklow 1803. Bearforest Co. Cork 1807–8. Rochestown house, Co. tipperary 1807. Hyde Park, Co. Wexford 1807. Bellair House, Co. Offaly 1807. Weston Co. Galway. Gateway to Howth Castle 1810. gatelodge, Castlegar 1811. Rustic Cottages, Powerscourt, Co. Wicklow 1818. Ballyfin, Co. Laois, 1822. Baronscourt, Co. Tyrone 1835–43.

== Hospitals ==
Sir Patrick Dunns hospital, Dublin 1803–16.

== Schools ==
Grammar School, Co. Galway 1813–15. Erasmus Smith School, Bunclody, Co. Wexford. Anatomy School, Trinity College, dublin 1823–4.

== Triumphal Arch ==
O'Connell Street, Dublin, 1821

Morrison had a very extensive public and private practice in Ireland. Among his public works were alterations to the Church of Ireland cathedral at Cashel, the court-house and gaol at Galway, court-houses at Carlow, Clonmel, Roscommon, Wexford, and elsewhere, and St Mary's Pro-Cathedral, the Catholic Pro-cathedral at Dublin. He built or altered very many mansions of the nobility and gentry in Ireland, and was knighted by the Lord Lieutenant, Thomas de Grey, 2nd Earl de Grey, in 1841.

== Bibliography ==
- Rowan, Ann Martha (1989). The Architecture of Richard Morrison and William Vitruvius Morrison. Dublin: Irish Architectural Archive. ISBN 0-9515536-0-7.
