= Shop Street =

Street in Galway City

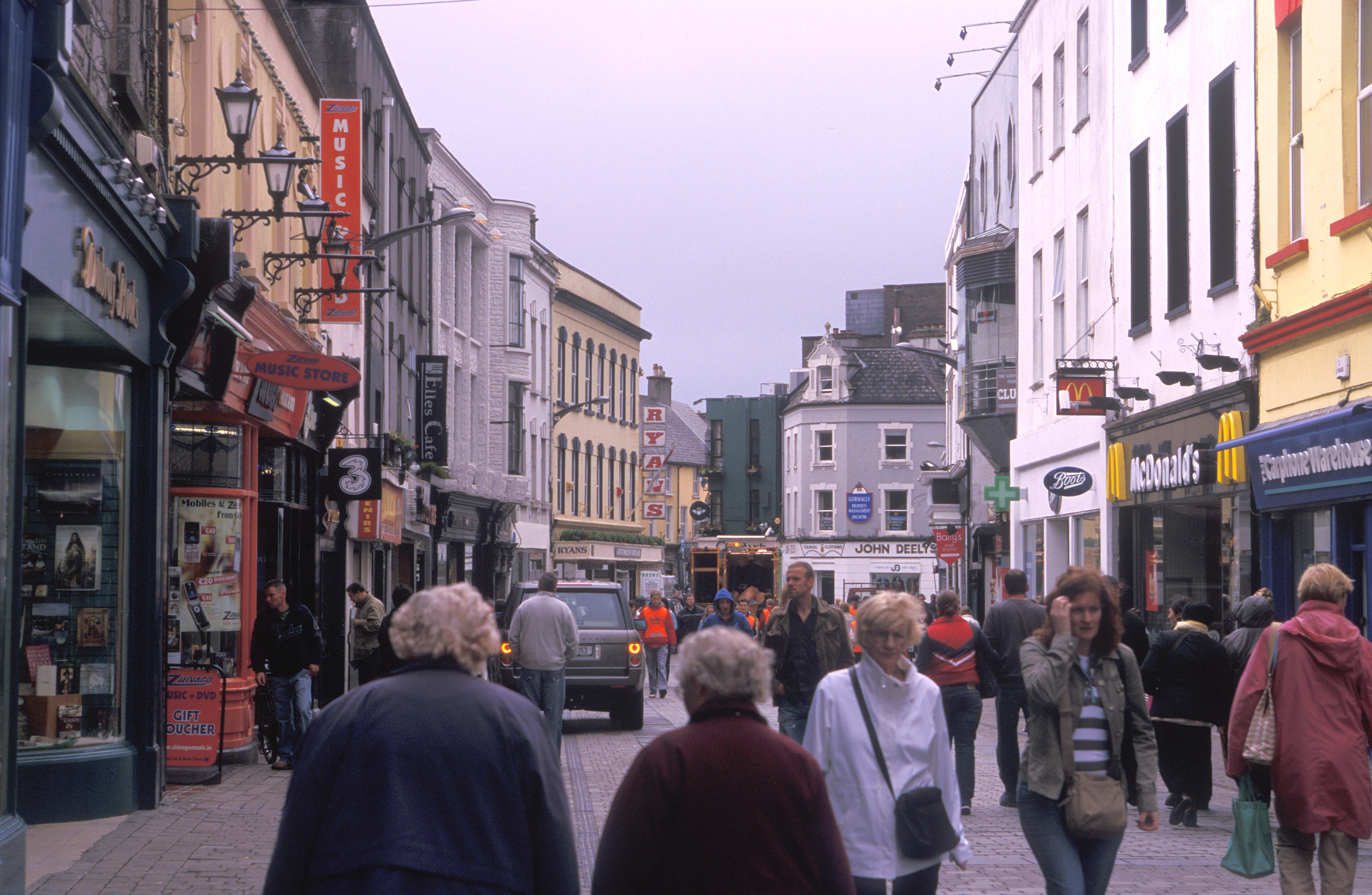

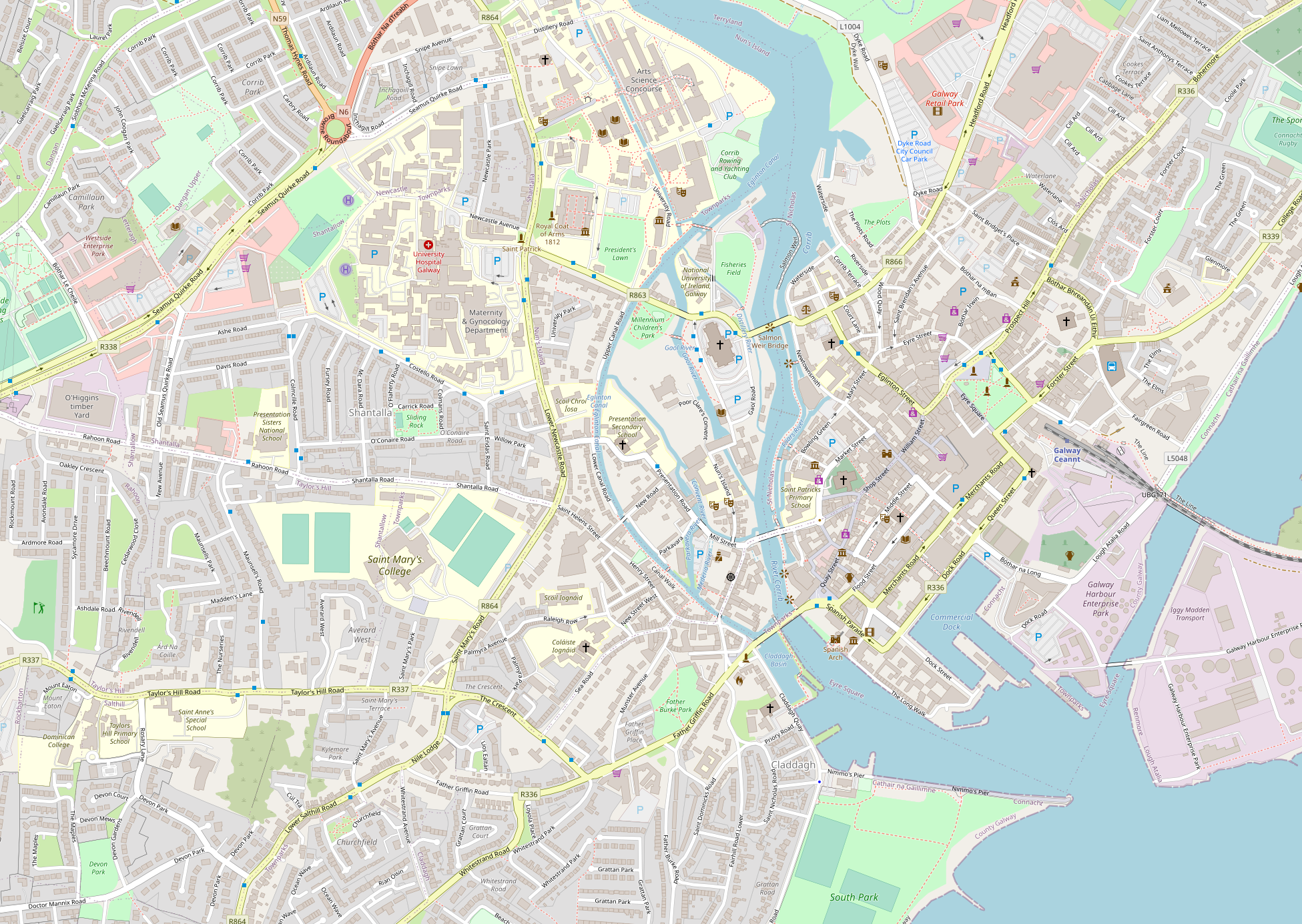
- Location within Galway
- Native name: Sráid na Siopaí (Irish)
- Length: 110 m (360 ft)
- Width: 12 metres (39 ft)
- Location: Galway, Ireland
- Postal code: H91
- Coordinates: 53.2727°N 9.0527°W
- Northeast end: Abbeygate Street, William Street
- Southwest end: Mainguard Street, High Street

Shop Street (Irish: Sráid na Siopaí) is the main thoroughfare of the city of Galway in the west of Ireland. It has been pedestrianised since the late 1990s.

This street was one of the first streets in the city to develop a retail focus and is Galway's main shopping street. Shop Street contains a number of old brick buildings, bright shopfronts, and numerous pubs. The street name "Shop Street" is common in Connacht, being found in Boyle, Tuam and Westport as well as Galway. Street performers and buskers are prevalent on the street.

Lynch's Castle is located on the street and is one of central Galway's best preserved historic buildings. This 16th-century building was converted into a branch of Allied Irish Banks during the 1960s.

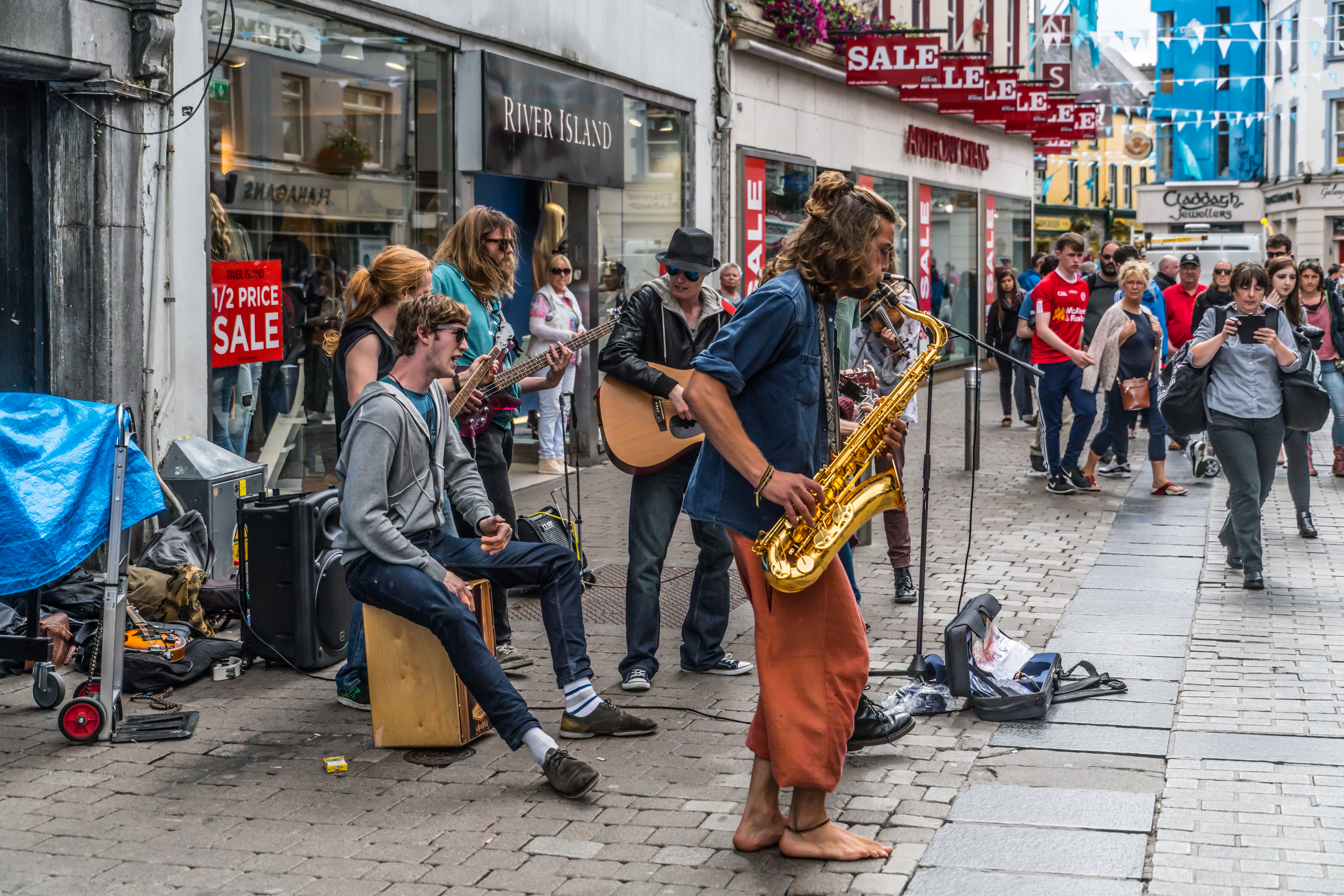
Buskers are a common feature of Shop Street

Book shops on Shop Street include Dubray Books and Eason & Son, with Charlie Byrne's Bookshop on nearby Middle Street.

As of late 2017, additional improvements and pedestrianisation works were proposed for Shop Street and the surrounding area.
